= List of Hungarian painters =

This is an incomplete list of Hungarian painters. For sculptors see List of Hungarian sculptors

== A ==
- Béla Apáti Abkarovics - Hungarian painter and graphic artist (1888–1957)
- Béla Nagy Abodi - Hungarian painter and graphic artist (1918–2012)
- Mór Adler - Hungarian painter (1826–1902)
- Gyula Aggházy - Hungarian painter and teacher (1850–1919)
- Tivadar Alconiere - Austro-Hungarian painter (1797–1865)
- Friedrich von Amerling - Austro-Hungarian portrait painter (1803–1887)
- Margit Anna - Hungarian painter (1913–1991)
- István Árkossy - Hungarian painter and graphic artist (1943–)

== B ==
- Ottó Baditz - Hungarian painter. He painted mostly genre pictures in an academic style (1849–1936)
- Endre Bálint - Hungarian painter and graphic artist (1914–1986)
- Rezső Bálint - Hungarian landscape painter (1885–1945)
- Pál Balkay - Hungarian painter and teacher (1785–1846)
- László Balogh - Hungarian painter
- Ernő Bánk - Hungarian teacher painter noted for his miniature portraits (1883–1962)
- Miklós Barabás - Hungarian painter noted for his portraits (1810–1898)
- Jenő Barcsay - Hungarian painter (1900–1988)
- Andor Basch - Hungarian painter (1885–1944)
- Gyula Basch - Hungarian painter (1859–1928)
- Gyula Batthyány
- Gyula Benczúr - Hungarian painter and pedagogue (1844–1920)
- Lajos Berán - Hungarian sculptor and artist noted for his medal work (1882–1943)
- Róbert Berény - Hungarian painter (1887–1953)
- Aurél Bernáth - Hungarian expressionist painter (1895–1982)
- László Beszédes - Hungarian sculptor, noted for his small bronze and terracotta statuettes (1874–1922)
- Sándor Bihari (1855–1906)
- Tamás Bimbó - Hungarian landscape painter (1968-)
- Zsolt Bodoni
- Pál Böhm (1839–1905)
- József Borsos - Hungarian portrait painter and photographer (1821–1883)
- Miklós Borsos - Hungarian sculptor (1906–1990)
- Sándor Bortnyik - Hungarian painter and graphic designer (1893–1976)
- Samu Börtsök (1881–1931)
- Gabor Breznay
- József Breznay
- Károly Brocky
- Sándor Brodszky
- Lajos Bruck

== C ==
- István Csók - Hungarian Impressionist painter (1865–1961)
- Lajos Csontó - Hungarian painter
- Béla Czóbel - Hungarian painter (1883–1976)
- Tibor Czorba - painter (1906–1985)

== D ==
- Adrienn Henczné Deák (1890–956)
- Valéria Dénes (1877–1915)
- Gyula Derkovits
- Balázs Diószegi - Hungarian painter primarily using the colour black (1914–1999)
- László Dombrovszky - Hungarian painter (1894–1982)
- János Donát - Hungarian painter (1744–1830)
- Géza Dósa - Hungarian painter (1846–1871)
- Orshi Drozdik - Hungarian feminist artist (1946–)

== E ==
- József Egry - Hungarian modernist painter (1883–1951)

== F ==
- Bogi Fabian - Hungarian painter who uses glow-in-the-dark techniques
- Adolf Fényes
- Béni Ferenczy - Hungarian sculptor and graphic artist (1890–1967)
- Károly Ferenczy - Hungarian painter (1862–1917)
- Noémi Ferenczy - Hungarian tapestry designer and weaver (1890–1957)
- Árpád Feszty - Hungarian historical painter (1856–1914)

== G ==
- Tamás Galambos
- Ilka Gedő - Jewish Hungarian artist (1921–1985)
- Ernő Grünbaum - Jewish Hungarian painter (1908–1944/45)
- Lajos Gulácsy
- Jenő Gyárfás (1857–1925)
- Líviusz Gyulai - Hungarian graphic artist, printmaker, illustrator (1937–2021)

== H ==
- Simon Hantaï - influential painter using folding method (1922–2008)
- Sam Havadtoy - neo-pop painter and interior designer (1952–)
- Adolf Hirémy-Hirschl - historical and mythological painting (1860–1933)
- Simon Hollósy - Hungarian painter of Armenian ancestry (1857–1918)
- Istvan Horkay - Hungarian painter (1945–)
- Elmyr de Hory - Hungarian-born painter and Famous art forger (1906–1976)

== I ==
- Béla Iványi-Grünwald

== J ==
- Gyula Jakoby (1903–1985)
- Viktor de Jeney
- Ferenc Joachim - Hungarian (Magyar) painter of portraits and landscapes (1882–1964)
- Zoltán Joó - Hungarian painter (1956–)

== K ==
- Bertalan Karlovszky
- Lajos Kassák - Hungarian poet, novelist, painter, essayist, editor, and father of many modernisms (1887–1967)
- Nándor Katona - painter (1864–1932)
- Isidor Kaufman - Hungarian painter of Jewish themes (1853–1921)
- Gusztáv Kelety - painter (1834–1902)
- Dóra Keresztes - Hungarian painter, printmaker, illustrator, graphic designer and animated film director (1953–)
- Károly Kernstok
- Károly Kisfaludy - Hungarian dramatist (1788–1830)
- Bálint Kiss
- Zoltán Klie
- Béla Kondor - Hungarian painter, prose writer, poet, photographer, and avant-garde graphic artist (1931–1972)
- Aladár Körösfői-Kriesch
- József Koszta
- Tivadar Csontváry Kosztka - Hungarian painter (1853–1919)

== L ==
- Márta Lacza - Hungarian graphic artist and portrait painter (born 1946)
- Émile Lahner - Hungarian painter (1893–1980)
- Philip de László - Hungarian painter of portraits of royal and aristocratic personages (1869–1937)
- Sándor Liezen-Mayer
- Emil Lindenfeld - Hungarian-American oil-painter (1905–1986)
- Károly Lotz - German-Hungarian painter (1833–1904)

== M ==
- Viktor Madarász - Hungarian romantic painter (1840–1917)
- Americo Makk - Hungarian ecclesiastical, historical portrait painter (1927–2015)
- Ádám Mányoki - Hungarian Baroque painter (1673–1757)
- Ödön Márffy - Hungarian painter (1878–1959)
- Károly Markó the Elder
- Zsuzsa Máthé - Hungarian painter, founder of Transrealism (1964–)
- Eszter Mattioni (1902–1993) - Hungarian painter
- László Mednyánszky - Hungarian painter in the Impressionist tradition (1852–1919)
- Attila Meszlenyi
- Géza Mészöly - Hungarian Romantic painter (1844–1887)
- László Moholy-Nagy - Hungarian painter, professor, and photographer (1895–1946)
- Master M. S. - painter who specialized in late Gothic art and in early Renaissance art
- Mihály Munkácsy - Hungarian painter of genre pictures and large scale biblical paintings (1844–1900)

== N ==
- István Nagy - Hungarian painter (1873–1937)
- János Nagy Balogh - Hungarian painter (1874–1919)
- Oszkár Nagy - Hungarian painter (1893–1965)
- Vilmos Aba Novák - Hungarian painter and graphic artist (1894–1941)

== O ==
- István Orosz - Hungarian painter, printmaker, graphic designer and animated film director (1951–)

== P ==
- László Paál - Hungarian Realist landscape painter (1846–1879)
- Béla Pállik - painter and opera singer (1845–1908)
- Arthur Pan - portraitist noted for paintings of Sir Winston Churchill and Jan Smuts
- Károly Patkó - Hungarian painter and copper engraver, noted for his nude paintings in a plastic presentation (1895–1941)
- Soma Orlai Petrich - Hungarian painter (1822–1880)
- Ervin Plány - Hungarian painter (1885–1916)
- Bertalan Pór - Hungarian painter (1880–1964)

== R ==
- István Regős - Hungarian painter and designer (1954–)
- Tibor Rényi - contemporary Hungarian painter (1973–)
- István Réti - Hungarian painter, professor, art historian and leading member, as well as a founder and theoretician, of the Nagybánya artists' colony (1872–1945)
- József Rippl-Rónai - Hungarian painter (1861–1927)
- Charles Roka - Hungarian painter of artistic kitsch (1912–1999)
- György Rózsahegyi - contemporary Hungarian painter (1940–2010)

== S ==
- István Sándorfi - Hungarian/French painter (1948–2007)
- Michael Aloysius Sarisky - figure, genre, and landscape Hungarian painter, who lived in Ohio, USA (1906–1974)
- János Saxon-Szász
- Hugo Scheiber
- Mihály Schéner - mid-20th century modernist artist (1923–2009)
- Oszkar Tordai Schilling
- Henriett Seth F. - Hungarian autistic savant poet, writer and artist (1980–)
- Amrita Sher-Gil - Hungarian-Indian painter (1913–1941)
- Oliver Sin - contemporary Hungarian painter, science art, math art (1985–)
- Bertalan Székely - Hungarian Romantic painter of historical themes (1835–1910)
- Adam Szentpétery - Hungarian Abstract painter (1956-)
- Pál von Szinyei-Merse - Hungarian painter and politician (1845–1920)
- István Szőnyi
- Lili Árkayné Sztehló - Hungarian painter and stained-glass decorator (1897–1959)

== T ==
- Judy Takács - Hungarian-American figurative realist painter (1962–)
- Mór Than - Hungarian realistic, pre-impressionist style painter (1828–1899)
- Ernő Tibor - Jewish Hungarian painter (1885–1945)
- Lajos Tihanyi
- János Tornyai - Hungarian painter (1869–1936)

== U ==
- Géza Udvary - Hungarian Romantic and Symbolist painter (1872–1932)

== V ==
- Lajos Vajda - Hungarian avant-garde painter (1908–1941)
- János Valentiny (1842–1902)
- György Vastagh (1834–1922)
- János Vaszary - Hungarian painter (1867–1938)

== W ==
- Henrik Weber - Hungarian portrait and history painter (1818–1866)
- Félix Bódog Widder - Hungarian painter and graphic designer (1874–1939)

== Z ==
- Mihály Zichy - Hungarian painter and graphic artist (1827–1906)

== See also ==
- List of Hungarians
- List of painters
