= List of painters by name beginning with "R" =

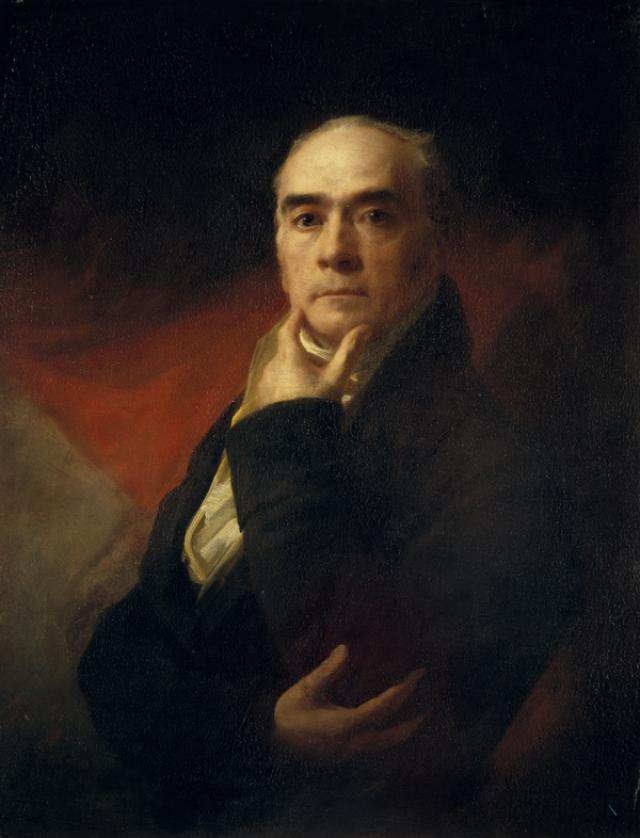
Sir Henry Raeburn

Please add names of notable painters with a Wikipedia page, in precise English alphabetical order, using U.S. spelling conventions. Country and regional names refer to where painters worked for long periods, not to personal allegiances.

- Mirko Rački (1879–1982), Austro-Hungarian (Croatian)/Yugoslav painter
- Anton Räderscheidt (1892–1970), German painter
- Ronald Rae (born 1946), Scottish sculptor
- Henry Raeburn (1756–1823), Scottish portrait painter
- Fiona Rae (born 1963), English painter
- Carl Rahl (1812–1865), Austrian painter
- Francesco Raibolini (1453–1518), Italian painter, goldsmith and medalist
- Victor Noble Rainbird (1888–1936), English painter, stained-glass artist and illustrator
- Edi Rama (born 1964), Albanian painter, writer and politician
- Allan Ramsay (1713–1784), Scottish portrait painter
- Carlo Randanini (d. 1884), Italian painter
- Ivan Ranger (1700–1753), Austrian (Tyrolean) painter
- Arabella Rankin (1871 – c. 1935), Scottish painter and woodcut artist
- Raphael (1483–1520), Italian painter and architect
- Joseph Raphael (1869–1950), American painter
- Dorning Rasbotham (1730–1791), English artist and writer
- Slava Raškaj (1877–1906), Austro-Hungarian (Croatian) painter
- Robert Rauschenberg (1925–2008), American painter and graphic artist
- Dirck de Quade van Ravesteyn (1565–1620), Dutch painter
- Hubert van Ravesteyn (1638–1691), Dutch painter
- Jan Antonisz van Ravesteyn (1572–1657), Dutch court painter
- Rachel Reckitt (1908–1995), English wood engraver, sculptor and designer
- Edward Willis Redfield (1869–1965), American landscape painter
- Tommaso Redi (1665–1726), Italian painter
- Odilon Redon (1840–1916), French painter, print-maker and draftsman
- Pierre-Joseph Redouté (1759–1840), Belgian painter and botanist
- Anne Redpath (1895–1965), Scottish painter
- Paula Rego (1935–2022), Portuguese/English visual artist
- István Regős (born 1954), Hungarian painter and artist
- Don Reichert (1932–2013), Canadian artist and photographer
- Flora Macdonald Reid (1861–1938), Scottish/English painter
- George Reid (1841–1913), Scottish painter
- John Robertson Reid (1851–1926), Scottish/English painter
- Robert Reid (1862–1929), American painter and stained-glass artist
- Wenzel Lorenz Reiner (1688–1743), Bohemian painter
- Haydar Reis(c. 1492/4 – 1572/4), Ottoman naval captain, painter and poet
- Rembrandt (1606–1669), Dutch draftsman, painter and print-maker
- Frederic Remington (1861–1909), American painter, sculptor and writer
- Ren Bonian (任頤, 1840–1896), Chinese painter
- Ren Renfa (任仁發, 1254–1327), Chinese artist and government official
- Ren Xiong (任熊, 1823–1857), Chinese painter
- Ren Xun (任薰, 1835–1893), Chinese painter
- Guido Reni (1575–1642), Italian painter
- Donald Renner (1926-2014), American painter
- Pierre-Auguste Renoir (1841–1919), French painter
- Pierre Roland Renoir (born 1958), Canadian painter
- Tibor Rényi (born 1973), Hungarian painter
- Ilya Yefimovich Repin (1844–1930), Russian/Soviet painter
- Marcos Restrepo (born 1961), Ecuadorian painter
- Paul Resika (born 1928), American painter
- István Réti (1872–1945), Hungarian painter, professor and art historian
- Pablo Rey (born 1968), Spanish painter
- Maurice Reymond (1862–1936), Swiss sculptor, painter and engraver
- Joshua Reynolds (1723–1792), English portrait painter
- J. Massey Rhind (1860–1936), Scottish/American sculptor
- John Rhind (1828–1892), Scottish sculptor
- John Stevenson Rhind (1859–1937), Scottish sculptor
- William Birnie Rhind (1853–1933), Scottish sculptor
- Théodule Ribot (1823–1891), French painter and print-maker
- Sebastiano Ricci (1659–1734), Italian painter
- Suzy Rice (living), American painter, screenwriter and fiction author
- Ceri Richards (1903–1971), Welsh painter and print-maker
- Jesse Richards (born 1975), American painter, film-maker and photographer
- William Trost Richards (1833–1905), American landscape artist
- Mary Curtis Richardson (1848–1931), American painter
- Willy Bo Richardson (born 1974), American painter
- Robert Richenburg (1917–2006), American painter
- William Blake Richmond (1842–1921), English painter, sculptor and stained-glass designer
- Gerhard Richter (born 1932), German visual artist
- Charles Ricketts (1866–1931), Swiss-born English painter, illustrator and typographer
- Hyacinthe Rigaud (1659–1743), French painter
- Anne Rigney (born 1957), Irish visual artist and sculptor
- Bridget Riley (born 1931), English op art painter
- Penny Rimbaud (born 1943), English painter, poet and musician
- L. A. Ring (1854–1933), Danish painter
- Pieter de Ring (1615–1660), Dutch painter
- Jean-Paul Riopelle (1923–2002), Canadian painter and sculptor
- József Rippl-Rónai (1861–1927), Hungarian painter
- Friedrich Ritter von Friedländer-Malheim (1825–1901), Austro-Hungarian (Bohemian) painter
- Rafael Ritz (1829–1894), Swiss painter
- Arturo Rivera (born 1945), Mexican painter
- Diego Rivera (1886–1957), Mexican painter
- Manuel Rivera (1927–1995), Spanish painter
- Larry Rivers (1923–2002), American artist, musician and film-maker
- Hubert Robert (1733–1808), French painter
- David Roberts (1796–1864), Scottish painter and lithographer
- Tom Roberts (1856–1931), Australian artist
- Alexander Robertson (1772–1841), Scottish/American miniaturist and engraver
- Andrew Robertson (1777–1845), Scottish miniaturist
- Archibald Robertson (1765–1835), Scottish/American painter and watercolorist
- Theodore Robinson (1852–1896), American painter
- Norman Rockwell (1894–1978), American painter and illustrator
- Henryk Rodakowski (1823–1894), Polish painter
- Alexander Rodchenko (1891–1956), Russian artist, sculptor and photographer
- George Rodrigue (1944–2013), American painter
- Holger Roed (1846–1874), Danish painter
- Jørgen Roed (1808–1888), Danish painter
- Nicholas Roerich (1874–1947), Russian painter and philosopher
- Svetoslav Roerich (1904–1993), Russian/Indian painter and architect
- Kurt Roesch (1905–1984), German/American painter
- Claude Rogers (1907–1979), English painter and teacher
- Christian Rohlfs (1849–1938), German painter
- Charles Roka (1912–1999), Hungarian/Norwegian painter
- Fyodor Rokotov (1736–1809), Russian portrait painter
- Charles Rollier (1912–1968), Swiss painter
- Osvaldo Romberg (1938–2019), Argentine/Israeli artist and professor
- Gillis Rombouts (1630–1678), Dutch painter
- George Romney (1734–1802), English portrait painter
- Martinus Rørbye (1803–1848), Danish painter
- Guy Rose (1867–1925), American painter
- Jan Henryk Rosen (1891–1982), Polish/American painter
- James Rosenquist (1933–2017), American artist
- Alexander Roslin (1718–1793), Swedish portrait painter
- Toros Roslin (1210–1270), Armenian manuscript illuminator
- Alex Ross (born 1970), American book artist and designer
- Bob Ross (1942–1995), American painter and art instructor
- Clifford Ross (born 1952), American painter, sculptor and photographer
- Jacek Andrzej Rossakiewicz (born 1956), Polish painter, theorist and interior designer
- Dante Gabriel Rossetti (1828–1882), English painter, illustrator and poet
- Antonio Rotta (1828–1903), Italian painter
- Jack Roth (1927–2004), American painter
- Mark Rothko (1903–1970), American painter
- Georges Rouault (1871–1958), French painter, draftsman and print artist
- Hassan Rouholamin (born 1985), Iranian painter and illustrator
- Henri Rousseau (1844–1910), French painter
- Théodore Rousseau (1812–1867), French painter
- Ker-Xavier Roussel (1867–1944), French painter
- Thomas Rowlandson (1757–1827), English artist and caricaturist
- Pierre Roy (1880–1950), French surrealist painter
- György Rózsahegyi (1940–2010), Hungarian painter
- Peter Paul Rubens (1577–1640), Flemish artist and diplomat
- Ernő Rubik (born 1944), Hungarian architect and inventor
- Andrei Rublev (c. 1360 – 1430), Russian painter
- Olaf Rude (1886–1957), Danish painter
- Hermann Rüdisühli (1864–1944), Swiss painter
- Andrée Ruellan (1905–2006), American painter
- Jacob van Ruisdael (1628–1682), Dutch painter, draftsman and etcher
- Alexander Runciman (1736–1785), Scottish painter
- John Runciman (1744–1768/1769), Scottish painter
- Phillip Otto Runge (1777–1810), German painter and draftsman
- Edward Ruscha (born 1937), American painter, print-maker and photographer
- Nadya Rusheva (1952–1969), Russian painter and illustrator
- Santiago Rusiñol (1861–1931), Spanish painter, poet and playwright
- Vlady Kibalchich Russakov (1920–2005), Russian/Mexican painter
- Charles Marion Russell (1864–1926), American painter and sculptor
- Morgan Russell (1886–1953), American artist
- Jan Rustem (1762–1835), Polish (Armenian) painter
- Ferdynand Ruszczyc (1870–1936), Polish painter, print-maker and stage designer
- Rachel Ruysch (1664–1750), Dutch still-life painter
- Salomon van Ruysdael (c. 1602 – 1670), Dutch painter
- Andrei Ryabushkin (1861–1904), Russian painter
- Anne Ryan (1889–1954), American print-maker and collagist
- Eve Ryder (1896–1984), American painter
- Ryūkōsai Jokei (流光斎如圭, fl. 1777–1809), Japanese woodblock print-maker, painter and illustrator
