= List of painters by name beginning with "D" =

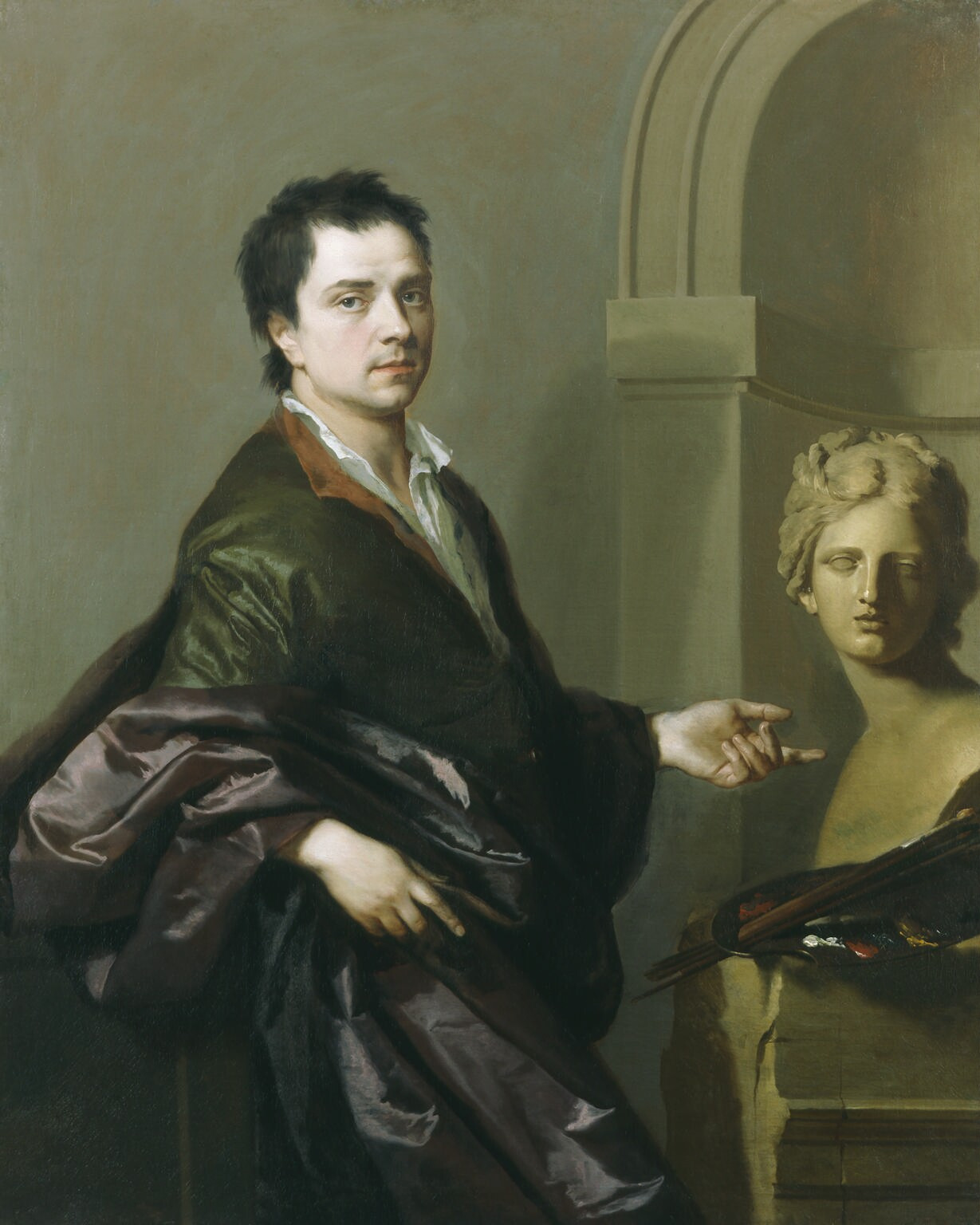
Michael Dahl

Please add names of notable painters with a Wikipedia page, in precise English alphabetical order, using U.S. spelling conventions. Country and regional names refer to where painters worked for long periods, not to personal allegiances.

- Richard Dadd (1817–1886), English fairy-tale painter
- Bernardo Daddi (c. 1280 – 1348), Italian painter
- Pascal Dagnan-Bouveret (1852–1929), French naturalist painter
- Johan Christian Dahl (1788–1857), Norwegian painter
- Michael Dahl (1659–1743), Swedish portrait painter
- Helen Dahm (1878–1968), Swiss print-maker and muralist
- Dai Jin (戴進, 1388–1462), Chinese Zhe School painter
- Dai Xi (戴熙, 1801–1860), Chinese genre painter
- Claire Dalby (born 1944), Scottish/English artist, engraver and book illustrator
- Roy Dalgarno (1910–2001), Australian painter and art lecturer
- Salvador Dalí (1904–1989), Spanish surrealist painter
- Christen Dalsgaard (1824–1907), Danish painter
- Thomas Aquinas Daly (born 1937), American landscape and still life painter
- Dietmar Damerau (1935–2011), German/Greek painter and sculptor
- Ken Danby (1940–2007), Canadian artist and medalist
- Vito D'Ancona (1825–1884), Italian artist
- Josef Dande (1911–1969), Hungarian landscape artist
- Leonard Daniels (1909–1998), English artist, teacher and administrator
- Heinrich Danioth (1896–1953), Swiss painter
- Nassos Daphnis (1914–2010), American painter, sculptor and plant breeder
- Fritz von Dardel (1817–1901), Swedish illustrator and caricaturist
- Nils von Dardel (1888–1943), Swedish painter
- Jacques Daret (1404–1470), Netherlandish painter
- William Dargie (1912–2003), Australian portrait painter
- Charles-François Daubigny (1817–1878), French painter of the Barbizon school
- Honoré Daumier (1808–1879), French print-maker, caricaturist, painter and sculptor
- Max Dauthendey (1867–1918), German painter and author
- Gerard David (ca.1450–1523), Netherlandish painter and manuscript illuminator
- Jacques-Louis David (1748–1825), French Neoclassical painter
- Mary C. Davidson (1865–1951), Scottish landscape painter
- Ivor Davies (born 1935), Welsh painter and mosaic artist
- Charles Harold Davis (1856–1933), American landscape painter
- Eleanor Layfield Davis (1911–1985), American painter and sculptor
- Mary Davis, Lady Davis (1866–1941), designer and painter of fans
- Heinrich Maria Davringhausen (1894–1970), German painter
- Gladys Dawson (1909–1993), English painter
- Janet Dawson (born 1935), Australian painter
- Gene Davis (1920–1985), American color-field painter
- Ronald Davis (born 1937), American painter
- Stuart Davis (1892–1964), American modernist painter
- Adrienn Henczné Deák (1890–1956), Hungarian painter
- Édouard Debat-Ponsan (1847–1913), French academic painter
- Alison Debenham (1903–1967), English painter
- Jean Baptiste Debret (1768–1848), French painter and lithographer
- Joseph DeCamp (1858–1923), American painter and educator
- Michel De Caso (born 1956), French visual artist
- Ettore "Ted" DeGrazia (1909–1982), American painter, sculptor, lithographer and composer
- Raoul De Keyser (1930–2012), Belgian painter
- Eric de Kolb (1916–2001), Austrian/American painter, sculptor and designer
- Roy De Maistre (1894–1968), Australian artist
- Giuseppe De Nittis (1846–1884), Italian painter
- Edgar Degas (1834–1917), French painter, sculptor, print-maker and draftsman
- Eugène Delacroix (1798–1863), French painter and muralist
- Michel Delacroix (born 1933), French naïve painter
- Beauford Delaney (1901–1979), American modernist painter
- Joseph Delaney (1904–1991), American artist
- Robert Delaunay (1885–1941), French Orphist artist
- Sonia Delaunay-Terk (1885–1979), French Orphist artist
- Dirck van Delen (1605–1671), Dutch architectural painter
- Willem Jacobsz Delff (1580–1638), Dutch engraver and painter
- Santiago Martínez Delgado (1906–1964), Colombian painter, sculptor and writer
- Paul Delvaux (1897–1994), Belgian painter
- Jenny Eakin Delony (1866–1949), American painter and educator
- Richard Demarco (born 1930), Scottish artist and promoter
- Grillo Demo (fl. 1978 onwards), Argentine/Spanish artist
- Charles Demuth (1883–1935), American water-colorist and oil painter
- Valéria Dénes (1877–1915), Hungarian painter
- Maurice Denis (1870–1943), French painter, decorative artist and writer
- Roger Wilson Dennis (1902–1966), American painter
- Christabel Dennison (1884–1924), English painter and sculptor
- André Derain (1880–1954), French painter and sculptor
- Brigid Derham (1943–1980), English abstract painter
- Gyula Derkovits (1894–1934), Hungarian painter and graphic artist
- Martin Desjardins (1637–1694), Belgian/French sculptor and stuccoist
- Paul Lucien Dessau (1909–1999), English painter and musician
- Yehia Dessouki (born 1978), Egyptian painter and visual artist
- Desta Hagos (born 1952), Ethiopian painter
- Édouard Detaille (1847–1912), French painter and military artist
- Claudio Detto (born 1950), Italian contemporary art painter
- Serafino De Tivoli (1826–1892), Italian artist
- Anthony Devas (1911–1958), English portrait painter
- Giorgio De Vincenzi (1884–1965), Italian painter and etcher
- Thomas Dewing (1851–1938), American tonalist painter
- Alexander Deyneka (1899–1969), Soviet painter, graphic artist and sculptor
- David Diao (born 1943) American artist and teacher
- Emiliano Di Cavalcanti (1897–1976), Brazilian painter
- Jessie Alexandra Dick (1896–1976), Scottish painter
- Robert Dickerson (1929–2015), Australian figurative painter
- Edwin Dickinson (1891–1978), American painter and draftsman
- Porfirio DiDonna (1942–1986), American artist
- Richard Diebenkorn (1922–1993), American painter and print-maker
- Pieter Franciscus Dierckx (1871–1950), Belgian impressionist painter
- Adolf Dietrich (1877–1957), Swiss naïve artist and laborer
- Mary Dignam (1860–1938), Canadian painter and activist
- Sam Dillemans (born 1965), Belgian painter
- Meredith Dillman, American fantasy artist and illustrator
- Silvia Dimitrova (born 1970), Bulgarian icon painter
- Jim Dine (born 1935), American pop artist
- Ding Guanpeng (丁觀鵬, 1708–1771), Chinese painter
- Ding Yunpeng (丁雲鵬, 1547–1628), Chinese painter
- Abidin Dino (1913–1993), Turkish artist and painter
- Dionisius (c. 1440 – 1502), Russian head of the Moscow icon painters' school
- Balázs Diószegi (1914–1999), Hungarian painter
- Paul Dirmeikis (born 1954), French-speaking Lithuanian poet, composer, performer and painter
- Eve Disher (1894–1991), English portrait painter
- Alén Diviš (1900–1956), Czechoslovak painter of the melancholic
- Otto Dix (1891–1969), German painter and print-maker
- William Dobell (1899–1970), Australian painter
- William Dobson (1610–1646), English portrait painter
- Mstislav Dobuzhinsky (1875–1957) Russian/Lithuanian painter and illustrator
- Lois Dodd (born 1927), American painter
- Isobelle Ann Dods-Withers (1876–1939), Scottish painter
- Theo van Doesburg (1883–1931), Dutch painter, writer and architect
- Eppo Doeve (1907–1981), Dutch painter and cartoonist
- Tommaso Dolabella (1570–1650), Italian/Polish painter
- László Dombrovszky (1894–1982), Hungarian painter
- Domenichino (or Domenico Zampieri) (1581–1641), Italian painter
- Óscar Domínguez (1906–1957), Spanish surrealist painter
- Tadeusz Dominik (1928–2014), Polish painter, draftsman and art professor
- Inshō Dōmoto (堂本印象, 1891–1975), Japanese nihonga painter
- David Donaldson (1916–1996), Scottish royal painter and illuminator
- János Donát (1744–1830), Hungarian painter
- Dong Qichang (董其昌, 1555–1636), Chinese painter, calligrapher and art theorist
- Dong Yuan (董源, 934–962), Chinese painter
- Antonio Donghi (1897–1963), Italian painter
- Lambert Doomer (1624–1700), Dutch landscape painter
- Gustave Doré (1832–1883), French artist, print-maker and illustrator
- Kees van Dongen (1877–1968), Dutch/French painter
- Géza Dósa (1846–1871), Hungarian painter
- Dosso Dossi (ca.1490–1542), Italian painter
- Gerrit Dou (1613–1675), Dutch painter
- Jaroslav Doubrava (1909–1960), Czechoslovak painter, composer and pedagogue
- Thomas Doughty (1793–1856), American landscape artist
- Aaron Douglas (1898–1979), American painter, illustrator and visual arts educator
- William Fettes Douglas (1822–1891), Scottish painter and President of the Royal Scottish Academy
- Thomas Millie Dow (1848–1919), Scottish/American painter
- Rackstraw Downes (born 1939), English/American realist painter and author
- Helen Thomas Dranga (1866–1940), British/American painter
- Pamela Drew (1910–1989), English marine and aviation painter
- William Dring (1904–1990), English portrait painter
- Willem Drost (1633–1659), Dutch painter and print-maker
- Orshi Drozdik (born 1946), Hungarian artist and feminist
- Malcolm Drummond (1880–1945), English painter and print-maker
- Russell Drysdale (1912–1981), Australian artist
- Du Jin (杜堇, c. 1465–1509), Chinese painter
- Du Qiong (杜瓊, 1396–1474), Chinese painter, calligrapher and poet
- Albert Dubois-Pillet (1846–1890) French painter and army officer
- Nikolay Nikanorovich Dubovskoy (1859–1918), Russian landscape painter
- Mario Dubsky (1939–1985), English artist
- Jean Dubuffet (1901–1985), French painter and sculptor
- Duccio (1255–1319), Italian painter
- Marcel Duchamp (1887–1968), French artist
- Raymond Duchamp-Villon (1876–1918), French sculptor
- Suzanne Duchamp-Crotti (1889–1963), French painter
- Jacob Duck (1600–1667), Dutch painter and etcher
- Jack M. Ducker (fl. 1910–1930), European landscape
- Jean Dufy (1888–1964), French painter
- Raoul Dufy (1877–1953), French painter
- Thomas Cantrell Dugdale (1880–1952), English portrait painter and war artist
- Edward Dugmore (1915–1996), American painter
- Karel Dujardin (1622–1678), Dutch painter
- Frank DuMond (1865–1951), American painter and teacher
- Helen Savier DuMond (1872–1968), American painter, sculptor, and teacher
- Henri-Julien Dumont (1859–1921), French painter
- Lady Sophia Dunbar (1814-1909), Scottish painter
- Augustus Dunbier (1888–1977), American painter
- Brian Dunlop (1938–2009), Australian still life and figurative painter
- Anne Dunn (born 1929), English artist and draftsman
- Elizabeth Durack (1915–2000), Australian artist and writer
- Asher Brown Durand (1796–1886), American painter
- Albrecht Dürer (1471–1528), German painter, print-maker and theorist
- Cornelis Dusart (1660–1704), Dutch painter, draftsman and print-maker
- Willem Cornelisz Duyster (1599–1678), Dutch painter of military life
- Geoffrey Dyer (born 1947), Australian painter
- Anthony van Dyck (1599–1641), Flemish/English court painter
- Floris van Dyck (1575–1651), Dutch still-life painter
- Friedel Dzubas (1915–1994), German/American abstract painter
