= Roka =

Roka may refer to:

== Locations ==
- Roka, Cambodia
- Roka, Panama
- Rõka, a village in Kastre Parish, Tartu County, Estonia

== Companies ==
- Roka (restaurant chain)

== Other uses ==
- Roka, a ceremony in the Indian subcontinent in which a relationship that will culminate in marriage is announced
- Róka, a surname
- Republic of Korea Army
