= Bahget Iskander =

Hungarian cinematographer

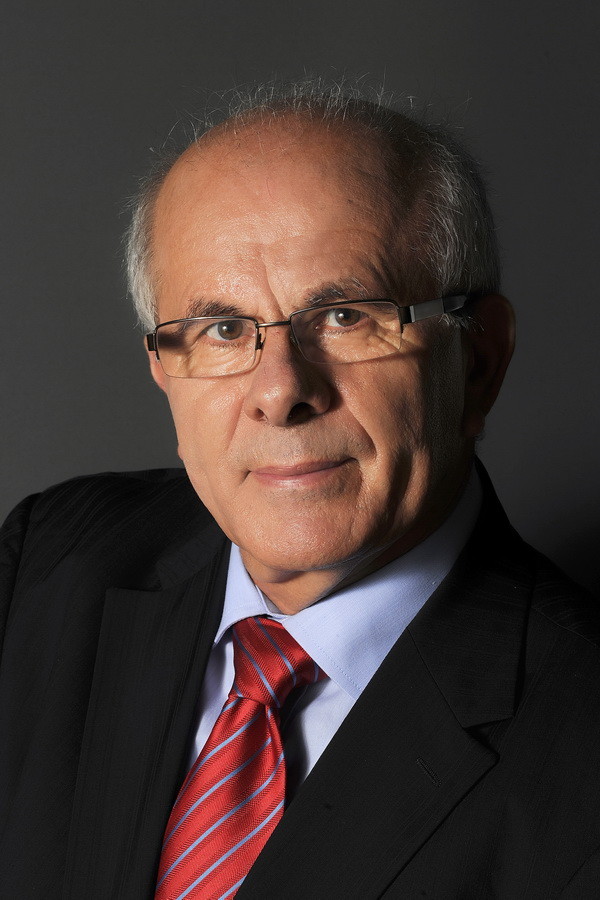
- Born: Bahget Iskander; August 14, 1943 (age 82); El-Barazin, Syria
- Occupation: photographer
- Spouse: Sarolta Bodor
- Children: Leila; Zsolt; Szabolcs; Botond; Vanilla
- Website: http://iskander.hu/

Bahget Iskander (born 8 May 1943) is a Syrian-born Hungarian cinematographer.

== Life ==
He was born on 14 August 1943, in El-Barazin, Syria. He has been living in Hungary since 1967, and has been a Hungarian citizen since 1979. His wife, Sarolta Bodor, is an insurance specialist at Alianz Hungary. He has two children: Leila is an economist and Zsolt is a lawyer; he also has two grandsons and a granddaughter. He graduated from the Technical College of Kecskemét as an engineer, and then in 1976, he became a teacher-engineer. After finishing his studies, he had several workplaces; among them, he worked for SZIM in Kecskemét, for Agrikon as a qualified engineer and later on he represented his Hungarian firm in Algeria and Morocco. Except for jobs abroad, he lives in Kecskemét-Hetényegyháza.

He has been working as a photographer since 1968; he usually exhibits at collective and individual exhibitions.

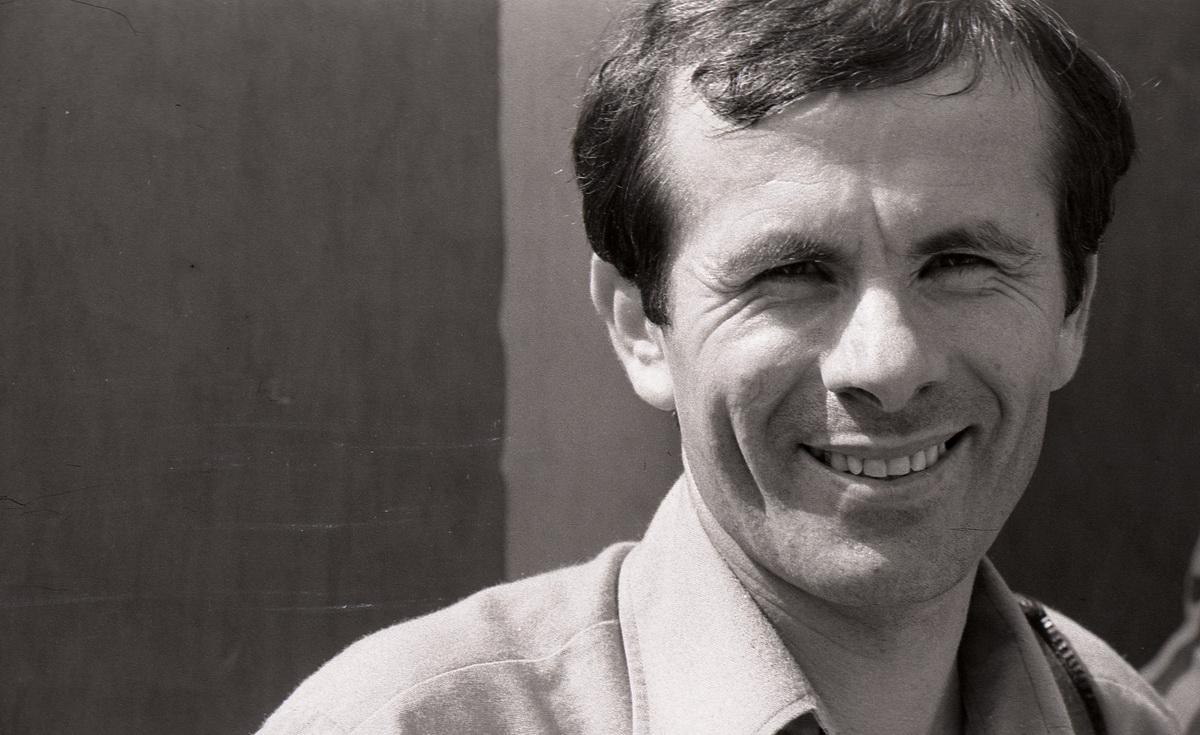
Bahget Iskander in 1979

He has exhibited his photos more than 250 times at individual exhibitions. Among others, he organized an exhibition for the benefit of refugees from Transylvania in 1989 and for autistic children in 1999. He nobly offered his works for the restoration works of the Hungarian Photographers' House in 2002. In addition to this, he is a member of the Town-Planning Association in Hetényegyháza. Since 1990, he has been taking advertisement and fashion photos in his own studio and he has been designing leaflets, prospectuses and catalogues.

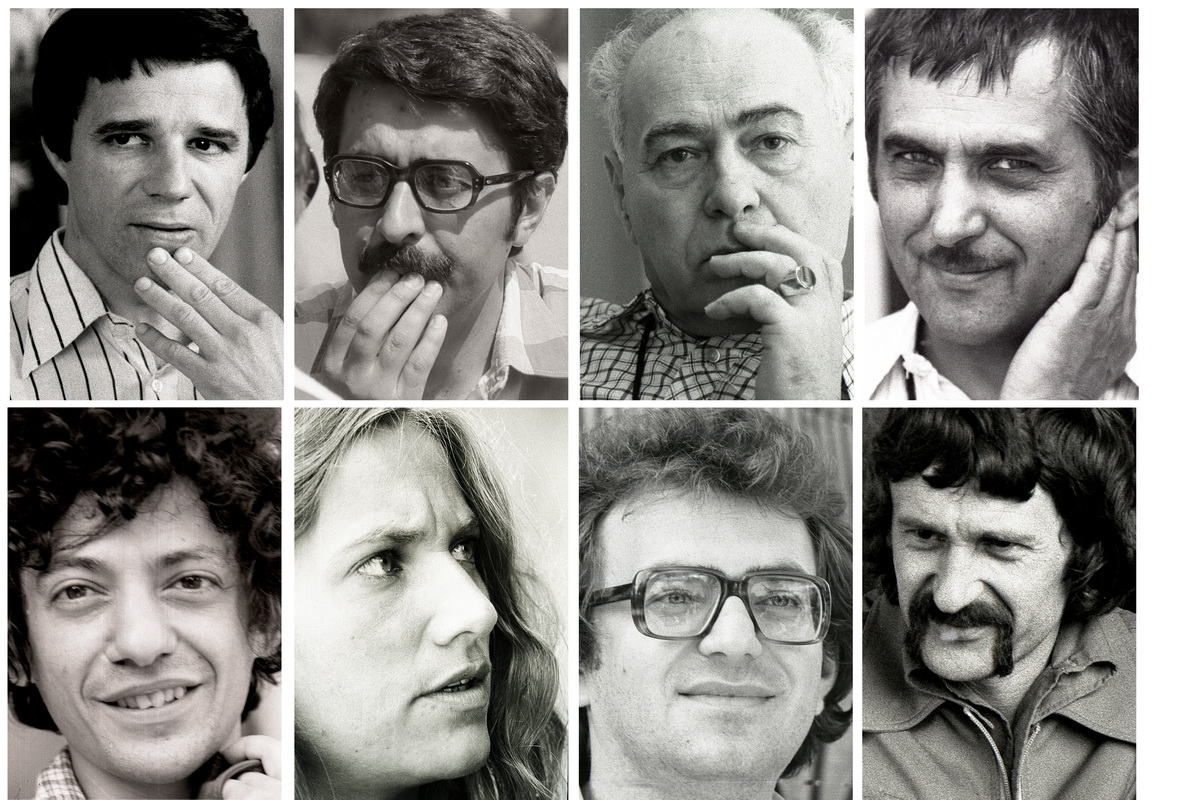
The portraits of young writers made by Iskander (from left to right): Ferenc Kulin, Béla Márkus, Imre Dobozi, Dániel Hatvani, Péter Kántor, Erzsébet Tóth, Lajos Pintér, Géza Aczél in 1979

Several reviews and the media have been dealing with him both in Hungary and abroad. Mainly, his black and white social photos, portraits, landscapes of the desert, and photos of outstanding Hungarian literary men, are well known (for instance: Gyula Illyés, György Faludy, Ferenc Buda, Sándor Kányádi, András Sütő, Nándor Gion, Péter Esterházy, Balázs Diószegi, Menyhért Tóth). He is closely connected to FORRÁS, a magazine on literature, sociography and art in Kecskemét. He was a participant and an exhibitor at the creative community centre in Nagybaracska, from its foundation till its cessation. At the end of the year 2006, he made a unique attempt: he made a private portfolio for twelve sportsmen chosen from the talented youths of Kecskemét. He prepared an excellent artistic calendar from these portfolios, and a series of exhibitions started. He regularly participates at the Pens' Camp in Veránka. He introduces and presents the illustrious and outstanding Hungarian cultural and historical events and figures with his writings and photos in the monthly magazine, Blue Danube, an Arabian language magazine, published in almost twenty countries of the world. Furthermore, he is a collaborator at the Kecskemét Magazine as well as at the Kecskemet Information website

His photos are usually displayed in the weekly magazine titled Kecskeméti Lapok.

He is a founding member and a fellow-worker of the Hetényi Köztér (Plaza of Hetény) newspaper.

A portrait movie of Iskander, edited by Zsuzsanna Sári, was presented at the 39th Hungarian Film Festival.

== Membership ==
- 1968 Rosti Pál Photo Club
- 1972 Photo Club, Kecskemét, Hungary
- 1980 The Association of the Hungarian

== Photographers ==
- 1987 Art Foundation (today: Association of the Hungarian Artists)
- 1990 The Association of the Hungarian

== Journalists ==
He has also been a member of the Workshop Artistic Association. The number of his awards, prizes is over one hundred, among others:

- 1968 National University and College Photo Competition Award
- 1977 Nivo Award of Association of Hungarian Photoartists
- 1978 1st place at the 13th Gyula Kulich Premfoto

=== Exhibition in Békéscsaba ===
- 1979 Nivo Award of Association of Hungarian Photoartists
- 1979 Art Award of Bács-Kiskun County
- 1986 SZMT-prize
- 1987 Award by the Ministry of Culture
- 2004 Award for the Public Education of Kecskemét
- 2005 Art Award of Bács-Kiskun County
- 2007 Candidate representing Bács-Kiskun County for Prima Primissima Award and reaching the final
- 2008 The order of merit of the Hungarian Republic - Knight Cross
- 2010 Regional Prima Award/Hungarian fine art category
- 2010 Award of the Ministry of Culture of Egypt
- 2011 Award of Ministry of Arts, Culture and heritage of Qatar
- 2011 Pilinszky Award
- 2012 "Pro urbe" Award, City of Kecskemet
- 2012 Order of Merit of the Hungarian Republic, Officer's Cross
- 2012 Pro Urbe Prize, Kecskemét
- 2012 Order of Merit of the Hungarian Republic, Officer's Cross

=== Main collective and one-man shows and exhibitions ===
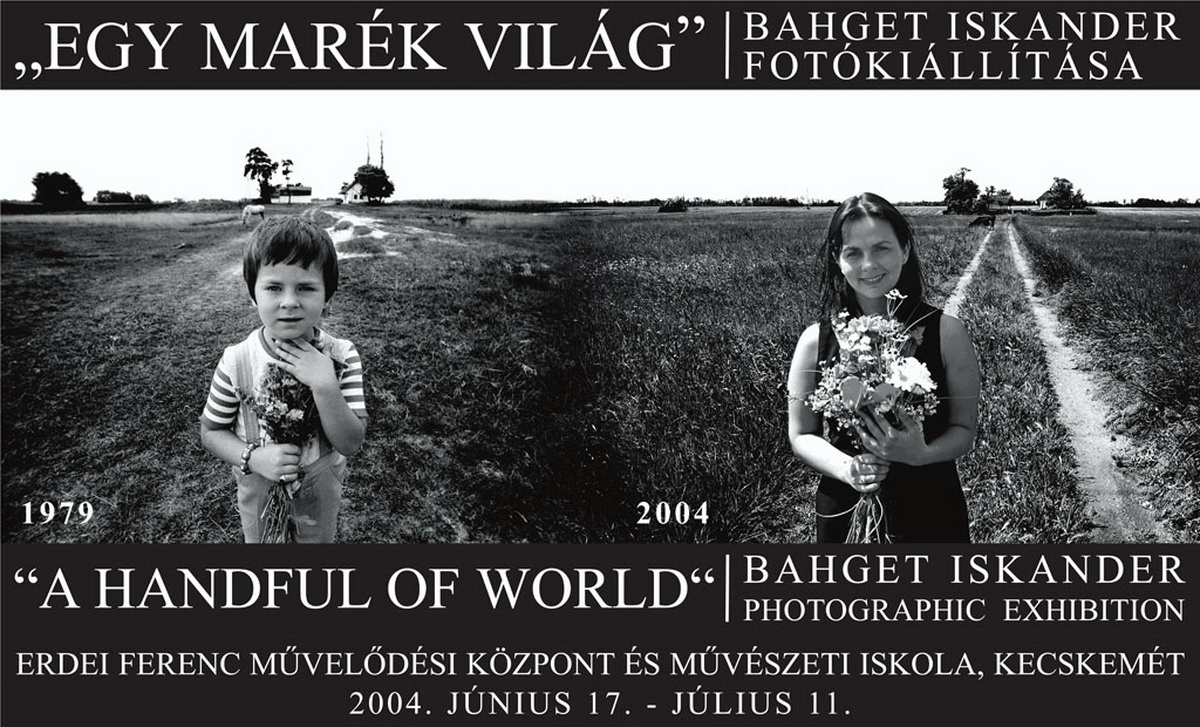
A Handful of World

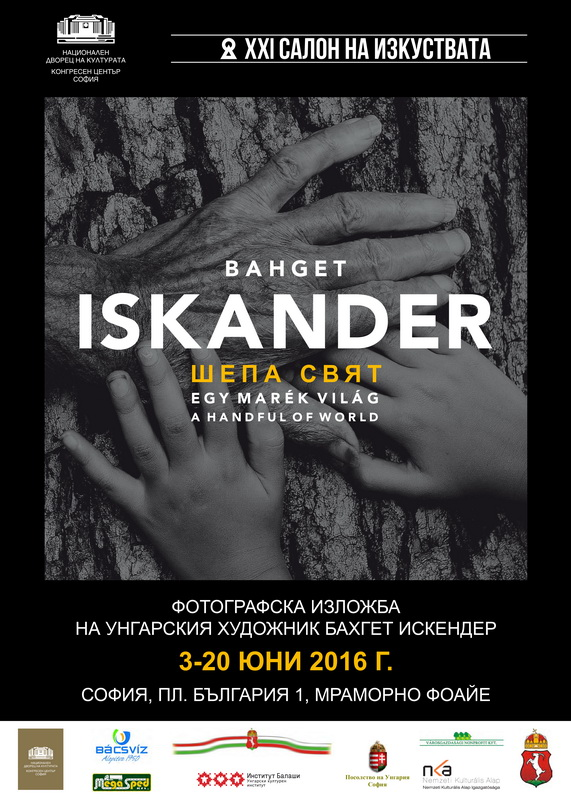
A Handful of World in Bulgaria

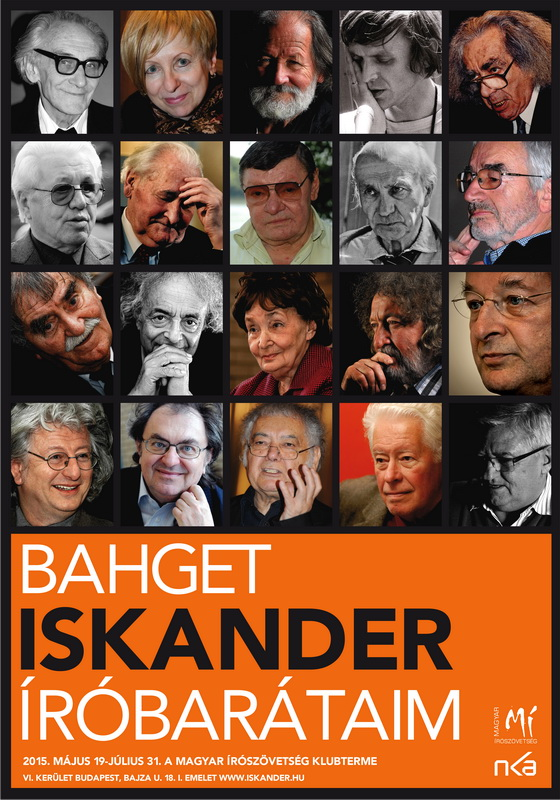
Íróbarátaim (László Vekerdi, Eszter Dobozi, Ferenc Buda, Sándor Lezsák, György Faludy, András Sütő, Sándor Kányádi, Gion Nándor, Gyula Illyés, Ádám Bodor, Ferenc Juhász, Adonis, Magda Szabó, Tibor Zalán, Péter Nádas, Péter Esterházy, Lajos Pintér, Sándor Csoóri, György Ferdinandy and László Füzi)

- 1975 Calgary, Canada; Alabama, USA
- 1976 Calgary, Canada; New-Zealand, Dunaújváros, Hungary
- 1977 Hong Kong, Nagykanizsa, Mosonmagyaróvár, Szolnok, Gyula, Hungary
- 1978 Kecskemét, Kalocsa, Hetényegyháza, Lajosmizse, Hungary
- 1979 Dávod, Kecskemét, Pécs, Kaposvár, Marcalli, Izsák, Lakitelek, Kazincbarcika, Salgótarján, Makó, Kiskunmajsa, Balástya, Kiskunfélegyháza, Hungary, Yugoslavia
- 1981 Blida, Algeria
- 1983 Budapest, Hungary
- 1984 Kecskemét, Nyíregyháza, Hungary
- 1987 Budapest, Hungary
- 1996 Denmark; Targu Mures, Romania
- 2000 Szeged, Hungary
- 2001 France
- 2002 Kecskemét, Dunaújváros, Hungary
- 2003 Csongrád, Hódmezővásárhely, Hungary; Miercurea Ciuc, Targu Mures, Odorheiu Secuiesc, Romania
- 2004 Damascus, Jebla, Lattaki, Syria; Kiskunhalas, Kecskemét
- 2005 Kecskemét, Békéscsaba; Jebla, Syria
- 2006 Kecskemét, Kecel, Császártöltés; Zombor, Serbia
- 2007 Kecskemét, Hetényegyháza
- 2008 Zombor, Serbia; Jabla, Syria; Kecskemét, Nagykőrös, Soltvadkert
- 2009 Lakitelek, Budapest, Kecel, Hungary
- 2010 Tiszakécske, Hungary; Damascus, Latakia, Syria; Kairo, Egypt; Tokaj, Budapest, Kecskemét, Hungary /Egyiptom "magyarab" szemmel/
- 2011 Doha, Qatar
- 2012 Kiskőrös, Hungary
- 2013 Budapest, Hungary Museion No.1 Art Gallery
- 2014 Budapest, Hungary National Dance Theatre
- 2014 Kecskemét, Hungary "MOTHERHOOD-ANYASÁG"
- 2014 Sofia, Bulgaria Exhibition and Traveling exhibition
- 2014 Vienna, Austria Egyptian Cultural Center
- 2015 Budapest, Hungary Buda Castle- National Széchényi Library
- 2016 Sophia –NDK Bulgary

His works can be found in many collections, image libraries, museums, inter alia, Romania, Transylvania, Serbia, Bulgary, the Museum of Photography in Kecskemét, National Museum of Egypt (Ahmad Shawki Museum) and Latakia in Syria Cultural Center, Qatar and Oman, Art Photographers Association. A number of media appearances, weekly and daily newspapers, radio and television interviews dealt with his works, both in Hungary and abroad His permanent exhibition can be visited at the Community Centre of Hetényegyháza

== Filmography ==
- 1996 Film Portrait by János Kriskó, Kecskemét TV
- 2008 Film Portrait by Zsuzsanna Sári shown on 39rd Hungarian Film Festival, Bem Cinema
- 2012 Interview with photographer Bahget Iskander in Aljazeera
- 2014 Photo album „A handful of world”, which summarizes my life's work, was published in 2012. The album serves as a basis for dialogue between cultures. In September 2013, the cultural magazine „Forrás” (Source) published a wide interview and appreciation about my art activities. DUNA TV. KULTIKON
- 2014 MTVA – Kvartett
- 2015 DUNA TV. KULTIKUN
- 2016 AL Ghad Al Arabi TV Channel / "Mubdeoon"2016 a film was made with Bahget Iskander to show his workmanship in Arabian language KTV-Politics, public life magazine
