= Early Evening Landscape =

Painting by Sándor Brodszky

- Kora esti táj (Hungarian)
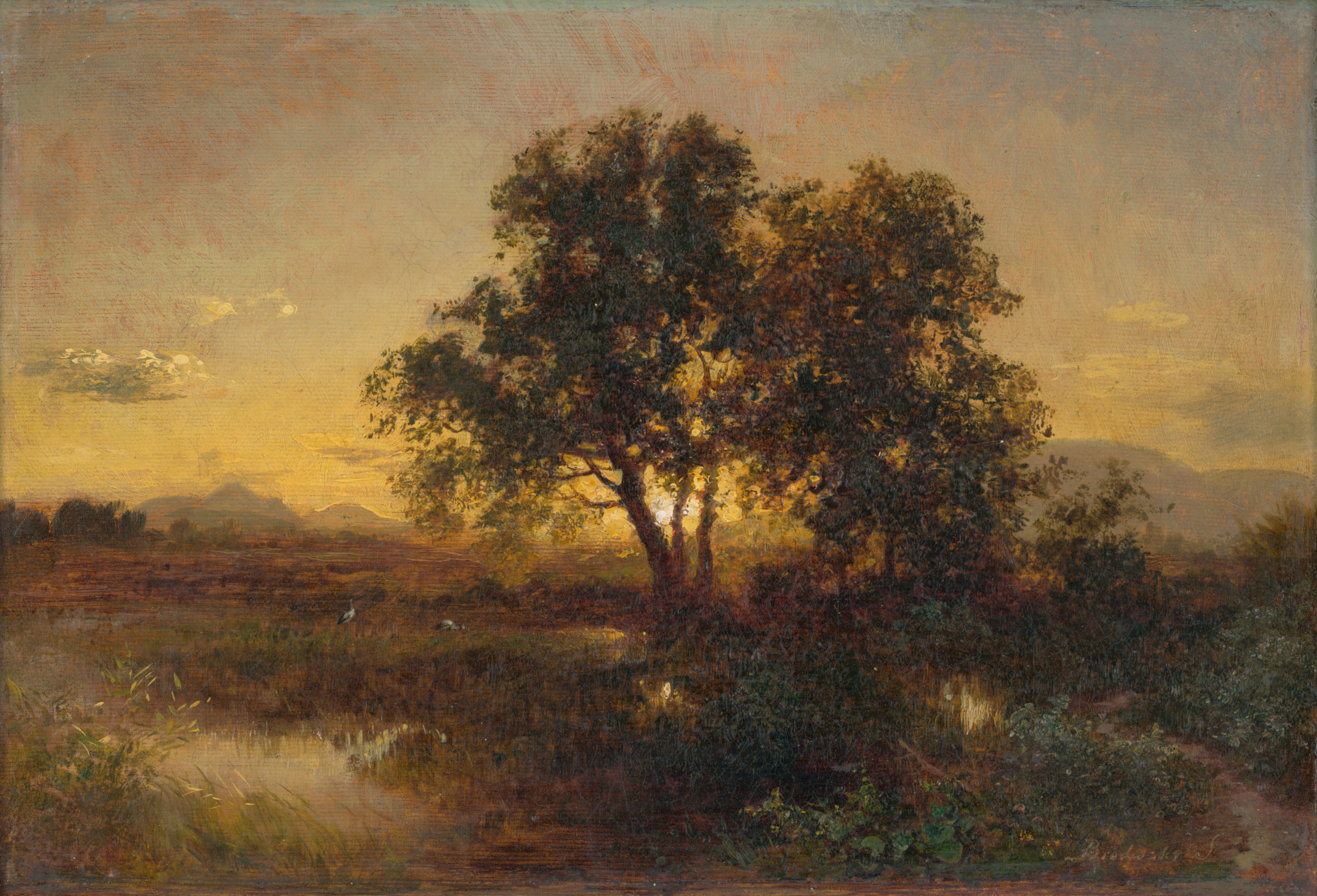
- Artist: Sándor Brodszky
- Year: 1850
- Medium: oil on canvas
- Dimensions: 23 cm × 33.3 cm (9.1 in × 13.1 in)
- Location: Slovak National Gallery; Bratislava

Early Evening Landscape (Hungarian: Kora esti táj) is a painting by Hungarian artist Sándor Brodszky from about 1850.

== Description ==
The picture is painted in oil on canvas and has dimensions of 23 x 33.3 cm.

The picture is part of the collection of the Slovak National Gallery, Bratislava.

== Analysis ==
Hungarian landscape painter Sándor Brodszky with another landscape painter of the second half of the 19th century, Antal Ligeti, were able to depict Hungarian landscapes giving them romantic resonance. He is the father of landscape painting and photography in Hungary. He studied at the Academy of Fine Arts Vienna, and from 1845 lived in Munich.

Brodszky was influenced in his landscape painting by Albert Frederick Zimmerman. Famous landscapes were created in Upper Hungary. His successful creative work was based on a good knowledge of the countryside and rural areas. The effect of light is important. Evening landscape depicts a combination of light with nature, along with a small group of animals. In his work he was particularly fond of portraying trees.
