= Róka =

Róka is a Hungarian surname meaning "fox" (especially red fox). Notable people with the surname include:

- Antal Róka (1927–1970), Hungarian racewalker
- Charles Roka (1912–1999), Hungarian painter
- Maria Roka (1940–2021), Hungarian sprint canoeist

== See also ==
- 2058 Róka, main-belt asteroid
