= Lajos Csontó =

Hungarian artist

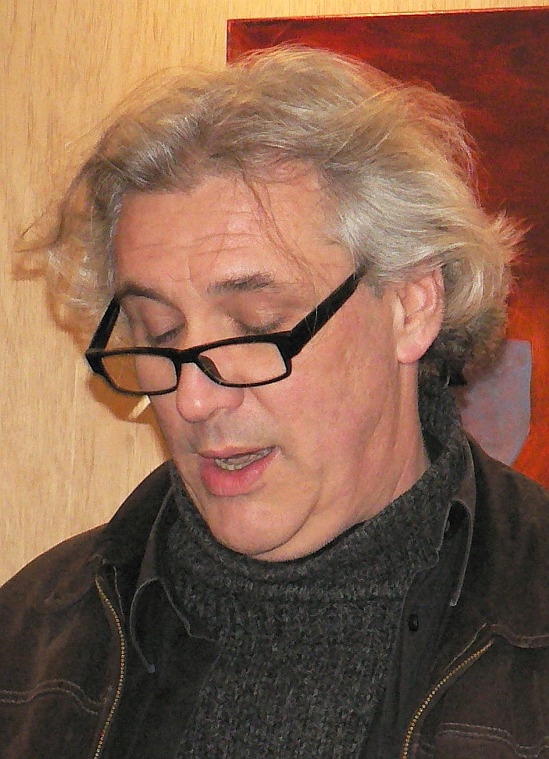
Image of Lajos Csontó

Lajos Csontó is a Hungarian artist.

Lajos Csontó was born in Budapest in 1964. He received his printmaker diploma from the Hungarian College of Applied Arts in 1990, and then he continued his studies at the DLA courses.

In 1992 he received Derkovits Scholarship, in 2007 the Munkácsy Prize. Currently he is an associate professor at the Eszterházy Károly College, and also gives lectures at the Moholy-Nagy University of Art. Many of his works are in public and private collections across Hungary.

In addition to working with traditional graphic and painting techniques, he got involved in photo and video art in the middle of the 1990s. He loves making installations and projects in which the process of creation is part of the work of art.

His relationship with Miskolc goes back to the beginning of his career. He regularly shows at the Miskolc Graphics Biennials, and has gotten awards as well (1991, 2004). During the spring of 2007, he and Gábor Gerhes presented the irregular exhibition: Special Life - Magic Days with a programme series, involving workshops and screenings. He held a workshop at the Galéria Alkotóház for college students in 2009.

Lajos Csontó has been exploring the relationship of the individual and the community, as in the past (the past of a family, the history of personal relationships), in one's immediate environment (family), within a larger community (friends, the profession), under the influence of the global society (advertisements, star idolatry), or amidst the complete indifference of society.

== Awards & Grants ==
- 2007 Munkácsy-award
- 2006 Scholarship of the Municipal Art Board, Cite Internationale Des Arts, Paris Scholarship of the Hungarian Academy Rome
- 2000 Hincz Gyula-award
- 1994 The prize of the Magyar Grafikáért Foundation
- 1993 The prize of the Fiatal Képzőművészek Stúdiója
- 1992-1995 Derkovits-scholarship
- 1992 The prize of the Művelődési Minisztérium, VIII. Esztergom Photo Biennal
- 1991 The prize of the Művészeti Alap, XVI. National Graphic Biennal, the prize of the Miskolc Fotóművészek Szövetsége, National Photo Biennal
- 1986-1992 Hungarian College of Fine Arts, duplicating graphics major

== Exhibitions ==
- 2009 Selected, Raiffeisen Gallery, Budapest;
- 2009 Lajos Csontó's exhibition, Líceum Gallery, Eger
- 2009 Viennafair, Inda Gallery, Vienna;
- 2009 Janco Dada Museum, Ein Hod, Israel
- 2008 Treaspassing (with Csurka Eszter and Kamen Stoyanov), Inda Gallery, Budapest
- 2008 Common Denominator, Kunsthalle - Dorottya Gallery, Budapest
- 2007 Literature, Budapest Gallery, Lajos Street Exhibition House, Budapest
- 2007 Bud, (with Imre Bukta) Synagoge, Eger
- 2006 Knit one, knit purl, Cellar Gallery of Vajda Lajos Studio, Szentendre
- 2006 One Shape is like the Other, Danube Museum, Europe Central Gallery, Esztergom
- 2006 Human-smithing, MG Gallery, Budapest
- 2005 Anti-matter, Picture Gallery of Szentendre, Szentendre
- 2005 Not enough yet, Kunsthalle, Budapest
- 2004 The music is beautiful, Centre of Arts, Pécs
- 2004 One-two, Vintage Gallery, Budapest
- 2004 Bath-projekt, Sofia Public Mineral Baths, Sofia
- 2003 Reflexinger, Kunsthalle, Budapest
- 2003 Kortárs Fotó, Pécsi Gallery, Pécs
- 2002 Restart, Vintage Gallery, Budapest
- 2000 You Misunderstood Me, But That's Your Job, French Institute, Budapest
- 2000 Display, Vintage Gallery, Budapest
- 1999 Mindent értek apa, Vintage Gallery, Budapest
- 1998 My God' V.M.K. Photo Gallery, Nyíregyháza
- 1997 Photographies, Miskolc Photo Gallery, Miskolc
- 1996 Euphoria, Winter Gallery, Szentendre
- 1994 Gallery by Night, (with Imre Gábor) Studio Gallery, Budapest
- 1994 Galerie mladych U Recickych, Prague (with Endre Koronczi, Dvoøák Roman)
