= Géza Dósa =

Hungarian painter (1846–1871)

Géza Dósa (1846–1871) was a Hungarian painter. He studied in Vienna and Munich between 1866 - 1869. His art was appreciated only decades after his death. His paintings are exhibited in the Hungarian National Gallery and in the museum of Târgu-Mureş.
