= János Saxon-Szász =

- Born: Szász János; 11 September 1964; Tarpa of Hungary
- Education: Pesti Műhely
- Known for: Painting
- Movement: MADI

János Saxon-Szász (Tarpa, Hungary, 1964) is a freelance Hungarian creative artist and art organizer.

== Career ==
He has been producing abstract, geometric, constructivist and MADI art works since the 1970s. His masters were Tibor Csiky (sculptor), János Fajó (painter) and Carmelo Arden Quin (creative artist, theorist).

Up until the 1990s, Saxon created many constructivist works. He worked for Budapest Workshop (in Hungarian: Pesti Műhely) for a while. He is a founder member of the Shadow Weavers (Árnyékkötők) Creative Group.

In 1992, he represented the Hungarian contemporary painting at the large-scale event Visions d’Europe in Paris, at the Eiffel Tower. Here became acquainted with Carmelo Arden Quin who is the founder of the international MADI movement.

Returning home he organized the Hungarian MADI movement and group. He and his wife, Zsuzsa Dárdai set up the International Mobil MADI Museum Foundation which would take care of the steadily growing collection of the Mobile MADI Museum. During the 1990s they organized several exhibitions from this material in Hungary and abroad too.

In 1998 Saxon and Dárdai published the first issues of the MADI art periodical which would become the forum of the international MADI movement, and geometric abstract art in general.

From 2000 he has won quite a few scholarships. He was invited to France as a scholar in 2000. During his 5 months stay he painted, taught children, and published his art programme in a booklet: Dimension Pencil (Dimenzióceruza).

In 2001-2002 he received a couple of invitations from the United States and was resident artist in New York City (Staten Island).

In 2002, Géza Perneczky (Germany) wrote a book about Saxon: The Poly-dimensional Fields of Saxon-Szász.

Saxon has been the managing director of the MTA-MADI Gallery (Győr) from 2005. In association with the Hungarian Academy of Sciences Centre for Regional Studies, he organized 3 or 4 exhibitions every year to introduce Hungarian and foreign MADI artist to the public.

He was one of the main organizers of the SupreMADIsm exhibition and conference held in Moscow, spring 2006. With this exhibition he and the other participants paid tribute to Malevich and the masters of Russian Constructivism.

In 2007, he left Budapest and moved to Szokolya.

In 2008, at the 'Ars GEometrica' exhibition in Pécs, children made a huge flower-bed with his geometric patterns.

== Individual exhibitions ==
| 2008 | Fortaleza (Brazil), Museu de Arte contenporanea |
| | Győr (Hungary), Horváth-Saxon: "Signs of space" and supreMADI |
| 2007 | Ettlingen (Germany), Galerie Emilia Suciu: supreMADIsm |
| | Montigni (France), Le Conservatoire des Arts Plasctiques: 3 artistes hongrois |
| 2006 | Moscow (Russia), supreMADIsm |
| 2005 | Győr (Hungary), MTA-MADI Gallery |
| | Paris (France), ORION centre d’art: géometrique MADI |
| 2004 | Budapest (Hungary), Lauder Javne School Gallery |
| | Nay (France), La Minoterie de Nay |
| 2003 | Pozsony (Slovakia), Gallery „Z” |
| | Budapest (Hungary), Institut Français |
| 2002 | Budapest (Hungary), Baptist Church |
| 2001 | Komárom (Slovakia), Gallery Limes |
| | Nice (France), Collèges Joseph Vernier et Victor Duruy |
| | Monaco, École Municipale D’ Arts Plastiques |
| | Budapest (Hungary), Island Gallery |
| 2000 | Budapest (Hungary), Light Gallery |
| | Mouans-Sartoux (France), Espace de l’Art Concrete – Maison Beuil |
