= Attila Meszlenyi =

Hungarian writer, painter and director

Attila Meszlényi
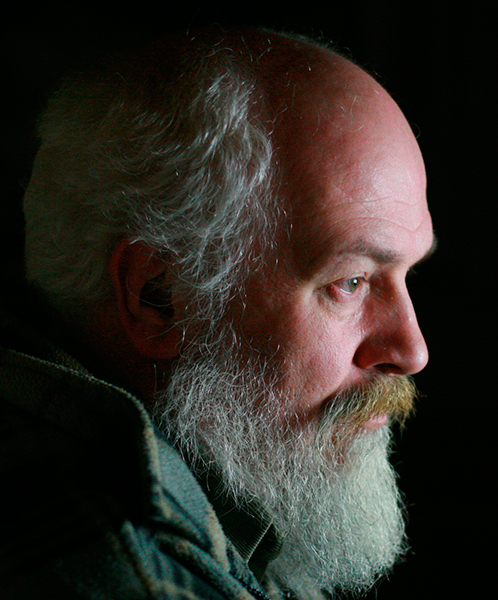
- Born: 2 May 1954 (age 72); Budapest, Hungary
- Occupations: fine artist; ecological writer; thinker; painter; graphic artist; animated film director; musician; composer
- Website: Paintings of Attila Meszlényi

Meszlényi Attila (born 2 May 1954 in Budapest) is an ecological writer, painter, animated film director, musician, and composer. His work as a painter and thinker is dominated by the theme of nature and our ambiguous relationship with it.

Attila Meszlényi has lived in seclusion since 2006. He prefers not to exhibit his work, publishing only on the Internet. His more recent works in relation to the ecology topic are available in parts online.

== Career ==
Meszlényi graduated in applied graphic arts from Képző- és Iparművészeti Szakközépiskola (Fine and Applied Arts School) in 1972. Against his parents’ and teachers’ wishes, he did not continue his education as he did not want to move away from everyday life. He also believed that self-education was worth more than institutional education. He spent the following years with various, mostly physical occupations, including time as a baker, a stone sculptor, a decorator, and a plumber. He continued his art activities in his free time and began to turn towards films.

Attila Meszlényi took part in a study called ‘A magyar film formanyelve és közleménye’ about film semiotics in cooperation with László Beke, Özséb Horányi, András Lányi and Róbert Vadas led by Péter Józsa. Spotted by Foky Ottó, he started directing animated films in Pannónia Filmstúdió from 1977 to ’79. He mostly worked on parts of the popular cartoon series ‘Frakk, a macskák réme’,.

After the series ended, he began working as a freelance graphic designer. He made covers and illustrations for over two hundred books, drew many slide films, and occasionally took commercial graphic design work orders as well. Since 1980, he is member of Művészeti Alap (Artist Fund) and its successor organisation Magyar Alkotóművészek Országos Egyesülete (National Association of Hungarian Artists).

In 1983, he founded an early music ensemble, Musica Profana, in which he played the Baroque flute and musette until 1993.

Due to the instigation of Muray Róbert and Dr. Zoltán Attila, from 1987, he started painting wild birds and mammals of Europe and occasionally other continents, mixing naturalist depiction with various stylistic elements.

In 1990, he founded (and has been leading ever since) the TARON TÁRSASÁG (called Gondolkodókör after 2001). Between 1998 and 2006, he was a regular participant of national exhibitions, fine art biennales. He continues to paint animals and plants, alive and dead, using watercolour or oil. Since 1999, he has been member of the Magyar Vízfestők Társasága (Association of the Hungarian Watercolour Painters). He co-founded the Unikornis fine art group with Péchy Tamás in 2001. Its members: Csíkszentmihályi Róbert sculptor, Nagy Judit gobelin artist, Nemes István painter and graphic artist, Szemadám György fine artist, Péchy Tamás environmentalist and Sárosdy Judit art historian. In recent years, he has mainly been painting and publishing his writings on ecology and art.

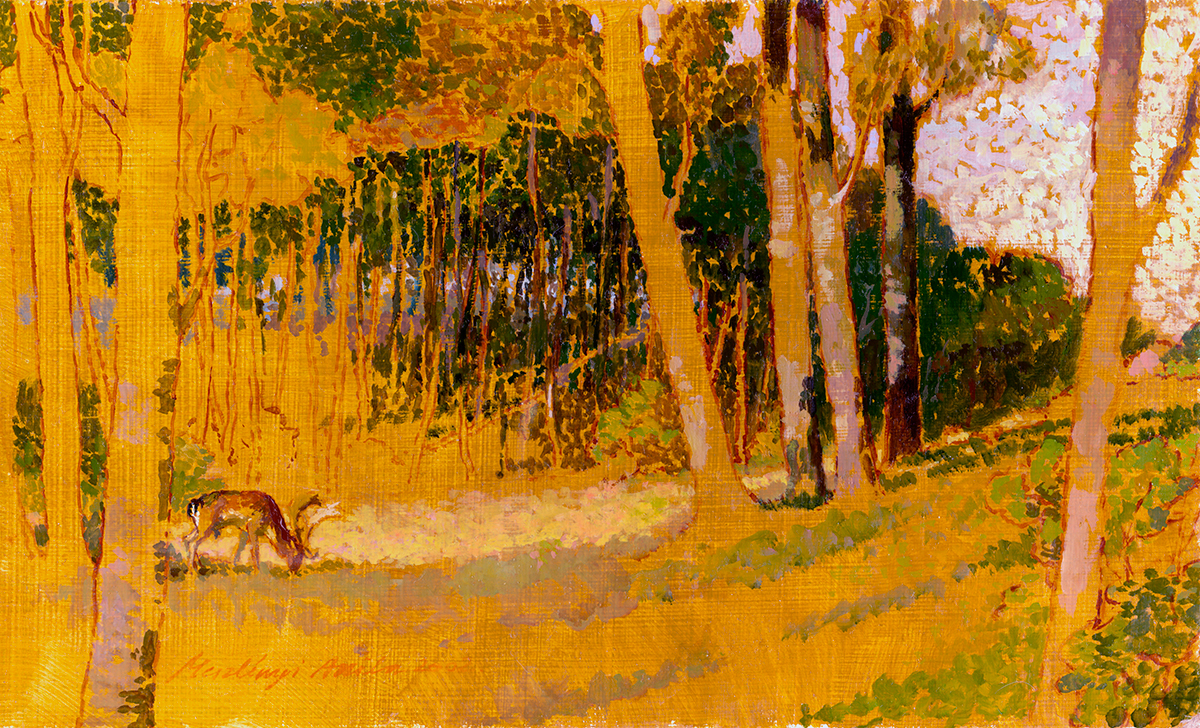
Glade at the Forest Edge

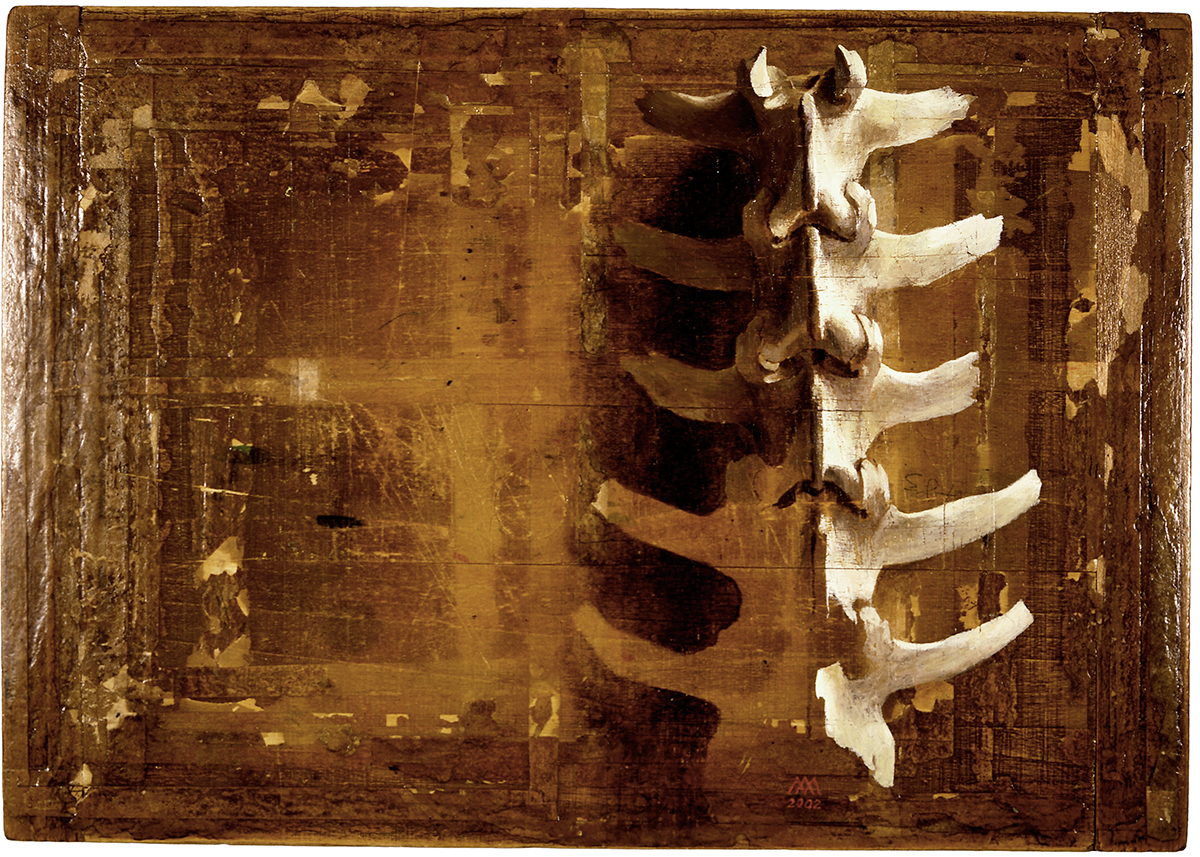
Spine on a Drawing Board

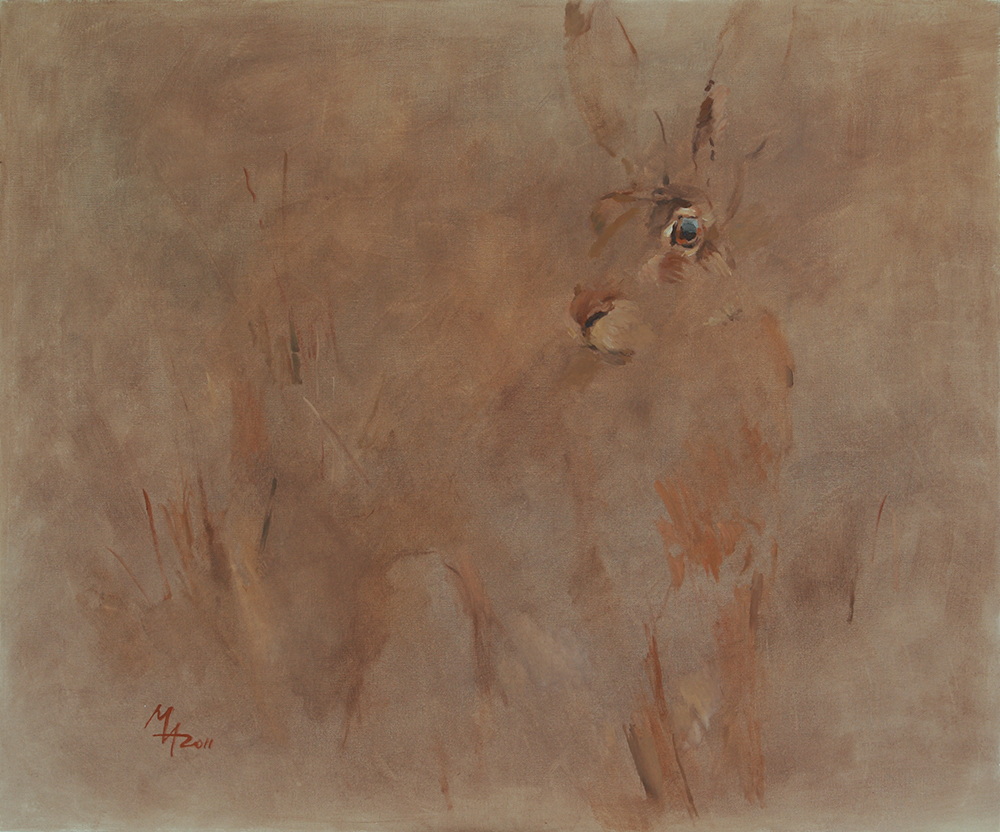
Rabbit

== Solo exhibitions ==
- 1985 Körmend, Batthyány Castle, Hungary
- 1987 Budapest, Hotel Mercure Buda, Hungary (together with Katalin Nagy)
- 1988 Körmend, Batthyány Castle, Hungary
- 1996 Budapest, Írók Boltja, Hungary
- 1998 Budapest, Természet Stúdió, Hungary (together with Valaczkai Erzsébet)
- 1998 Brüsszel, Contact Point Hungary, Belgium (together with László Péter)
- 1999 Budapest, Vigadó Galéria, Hungary (Enteriőr–Miliő)
- 2014 Sepsiszentgyörgy, Bene Ház, Romania
- 2014 Keszthely, a Helikon Kastélymúzeum Vadászati Múzeuma, Hungary

== Selected collective exhibitions ==
- 1998 „Csergezán Pál” Országos Pályázati Kiállítás, Szántódpuszta, Siotours Kiállítóterem, Hungary (Csergezán-díj)
- 1999 ’English water-colour by Hungarian Brush’ Hatvan, Moldvay Győző Galéria, Hungary
- 1999 ’Coloured Drawing’ National Mini-drawing Exhibition. Budapest, Nádor Galéria, Hungary
- 2000 XVII. National Water-colour Biennale, Eger, Dobó István Vármúzeum, Hungary
- 2000 X. National Drawing Biennale, Salgótarján, Nógrádi Történeti Múzeum, Hungary
- 2000 „Tér rajz” National Mini-drawing Exhibition, Budapest, Nádor Galéria, Hungary
- 2001 ’English water-colour by Hungarian Brush II’, Budapest, Újpest Galéria, Hungary
- 2002 IX. Panel Painting Biennale, Szeged, Olasz Kulturális Központ, Hungary
- 2002 XVIII. National Water-colour Biennale, Eger, Trinitárius templom, Hungary
- 2003 ’English water-colour by Hungarian Brush III’, Budapest, Újpest Galéria, Hungary
- 2003 Exhibition of Unikornis Group, Budapest, Csepel Galéria, Hungary
- 2004 XIX. National Water-colour Biennale, Eger, Trinitárius templom, Hungary
- 2004 Exhibition of Unikornis Group, Szentendre, Régi Művésztelepi Galéria, Hungary
- 2005 Exhibition of Unikornis Group, Budapest, Karinthy Szalon, Hungary
- 2006 ’Szívügyek’, Szentendre, Művészet Malom, Hungary
- 2006 XX. National Water-colour Biennale, Eger, Hungary
- 2006 ’English water-colour by Hungarian Brush IV’, Szekszárd, Művészetek Háza; Eger, Hungary

== Public collections ==
- Magyar Mezőgazdasági Múzeum, Budapest
- Dobó István Vármúzeum, Eger

== Public art ==
- Plaque of Muray Róbert (Budapest XIII. ker., Visegrádi Str. 23. Hungary, 2013.).

== Awards ==
- 1984 – Won the Award for Excellence from Magyar Diafilmgyártó Vállalat
- 1992 – First Prize at the international memorial competition – NATUREXPO.
- 1998 – Won the Csergezán Award

== Animated films ==
- Hajrá, vadmacskák! (Frakk, a macskák réme)
- Gumicsont (Frakk, a macskák réme, III. season)
- Egy tollseprő tündöklése (Frakk, a macskák réme, III. season)
- Egér pongyolában (Frakk, a macskák réme, III. season)
- Ki táncol Lukréciával? (Frakk, a macskák réme, III. season)
- Mit hoz a télapó? (Frakk, a macskák réme, III. season)
- Tündér Erzséböt (as co-director of Imre István)

== Books ==
- Ez a kapa, ez a kasza [Hungarian Nursery Rhyme] (Móra Ferenc Könyvkiadó, Budapest 1984)
- Csigakalauz [Snail Guide]
- Emberi tanítás [Human Teaching]
- Nyúlkalauz [Rabbit Guide]
- Sünkalauz [Hedgehog Guide]
- A világvége illemtana [Etiquette of the Doomsday]
- Olajfestés – vadon élő állatok [Oilpainting – Wild Animals]
- Művészeti állatismeret [Artistic Zoology]

== Selected publications ==
- Kiáltványok [Manifestos for Art]; Mozgó Világ 1981/10
- A musette, a dudák királynője [Musette– The Queen of Bagpipes]; Magyar Zene 1987/4
- Poems; Pompeji 1992/2
- Ne nézz a dobozember szemébe… [Do Not Look into the Box Man's Eyes...]; Liget 1997/11
- Humanista jelképek [Humanistic Symbols]; Liget 1995/12
- Egy természetfestő naplójából [From the Diary of a Wildlife Painter]; Nimród 1998/9
- Szponzorok [Sponsors]; Madártávlat 2003/2
- A létvédelem [Environmental Protection]; Napút 2003/4
- Seattle főnök beszédei [Speeches of Chief Seattle]; Napút 2003/7

== Published (musical) compositions ==
- A tenger éneke [Song of the Sea]; Ananda Sounds Edition
- (Sheet music) Könnyű darabok gitárra 17. és 18. századi művekből [Easy Pieces for Guitar; 17th and 18th Century Works]; Rózsavölgyi és Társa, Budapest

== Recordings ==
- Begone Sweet Night (baroque recorder, musette; with Musica Profana Ensemble)
- Puer natus in Betlehem (musette; with Capella Savaria band)
- A tenger éneke [Song of the Sea] (baroque recorder; with István Kozma and Zsolt Szabó)
