= Tibor Rényi =

Hungarian painter

Tibor Rényi (born 1973) is a contemporary Hungarian painter. He was born in Budapest, Hungary.

== Images from the subconscious ==
The main themes of his art are colorful, dream-like creatures and places of the subconscious. To get images from there, he uses a special technique similar to Rorschach inkblot test, which is used by psychology. He assists to his own subconscious as a medium. From random paint blots, he sees shapes and stories to emerge, then he boosts and refines them until the painting is done.

== Townscapes ==
Other popular themes of his art are colourful, mosaic-like townscapes with a light oriental mood. He's deeply touched by the forms and shapes of the old Ottoman architecture and the ancient Turkish world, as it can be seen many places at the Balkan region. There are a few memories of those times even in Hungary, like in the artist's favourite city of Pécs with 2 mosques from the sixteenth century.

== Medium and influences ==
Tibor Rényi's main medium is acrylic. From the great names of the twentieth century, Marc Chagall's and Friedensreich Hundertwasser's free winged lifework had the highest effect to his art.
