= Pierre Roland Renoir =

Canadian painter (born 1958)

Pierre Roland Renoir (born July 16, 1958) is a Canadian painter and the great-grandson of Pierre-Auguste Renoir.

Born in Monaco, Pierre Roland Renoir was raised in Cagnes-sur-Mer, the town in France where his great-grandfather painted and sculpted in his final years. He developed an interest in the visual arts at a young age and by the time he was fifteen, had already begun working on metallic plates using the dry-point engraving technique.

In 1978, he emigrated to Canada and made his home in Edmonton, Alberta. In 1981, after rebuilding his portfolio, his first professional art exhibition was organized in Edmonton. Encouraged by the response and appreciation of the public, he began a wider range of exhibitions throughout Canada, the United States and Europe.
