= Oszkár Nagy =

Hungarian painter

- Born: Oszkár Nagy; 1893; Magyarpécska
- Died: 1965 (aged 71–72); Baia Mare

Oszkár Nagy (Magyarpécska, September 11, 1893 – Nagybánya, March 1, 1965) was a Hungarian painter.

== His life ==
In 1912, he studied in Nagybánya, then between 1913 and 1915 he attended the Hungarian Academy of Fine Arts, where he was a student of Károly Ferenczy. He served on the Italian front (World War I) and was taken prisoner of war in Italy in 1917.

He returned home to Arad in 1919, then worked at the artist colony in Szolnok with Adolf Fényes, and in 1920 at the artist colony in Kecskemét with Béla Iványi-Grünwald.

Between 1920 and 1922 he visited Italy with a scholarship from the Romanian Ministry of Culture. Later, he lived and worked in Nagybánya for four decades. At the beginning of the 1920s, he wanted to create a rival artist colony in Felsőbánya, near Nagybánya, and therefore his colleagues resented him.

From 1922, he exhibited his works in solo exhibitions in Szatmárnémeti, Nagyvárad and Temesvár.

In 1993, an exhibition of his life's work was organized in Cluj-Napoca and in the Miskolc Gallery. His works are mostly figurative compositions (mainly mining themes), interiors, still lifes and landscapes of large mines and upper mines.

== Individual exhibitions ==
- 1922 - Nude art dealer, Szatmárnémeti
- 1930 - Journalist Club, Szatmárnémeti [with Laura Mándy]
- 1936 - Carlton Hotel, Timisoara
- 1940 - County Hall glass room, Cluj
- 1942 - University Library, Cluj
- 1944 - Széchenyi Square kiosk, Nagyvárad
- 1980 - Korunk Gallery, Cluj
- 1993 - Miskolc Gallery, Miskolc
