= Sándor Brodszky =

Hungarian painter

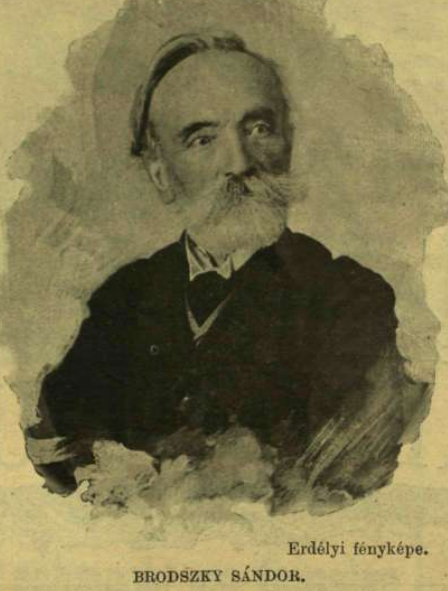
- Born: Sándor Brodszky; 1819; Tóalmás
- Died: 1901 (aged 81–82); Budapest
- Known for: painting, photography

Sándor Brodszky (Tóalmás, 1819 - Budapest, 1901) was a Hungarian painter whose works are featured in the Hungarian National Gallery.

== See also ==
- Early Evening Landscape
