= Dirck de Quade van Ravesteyn =

Dutch Golden Age painter

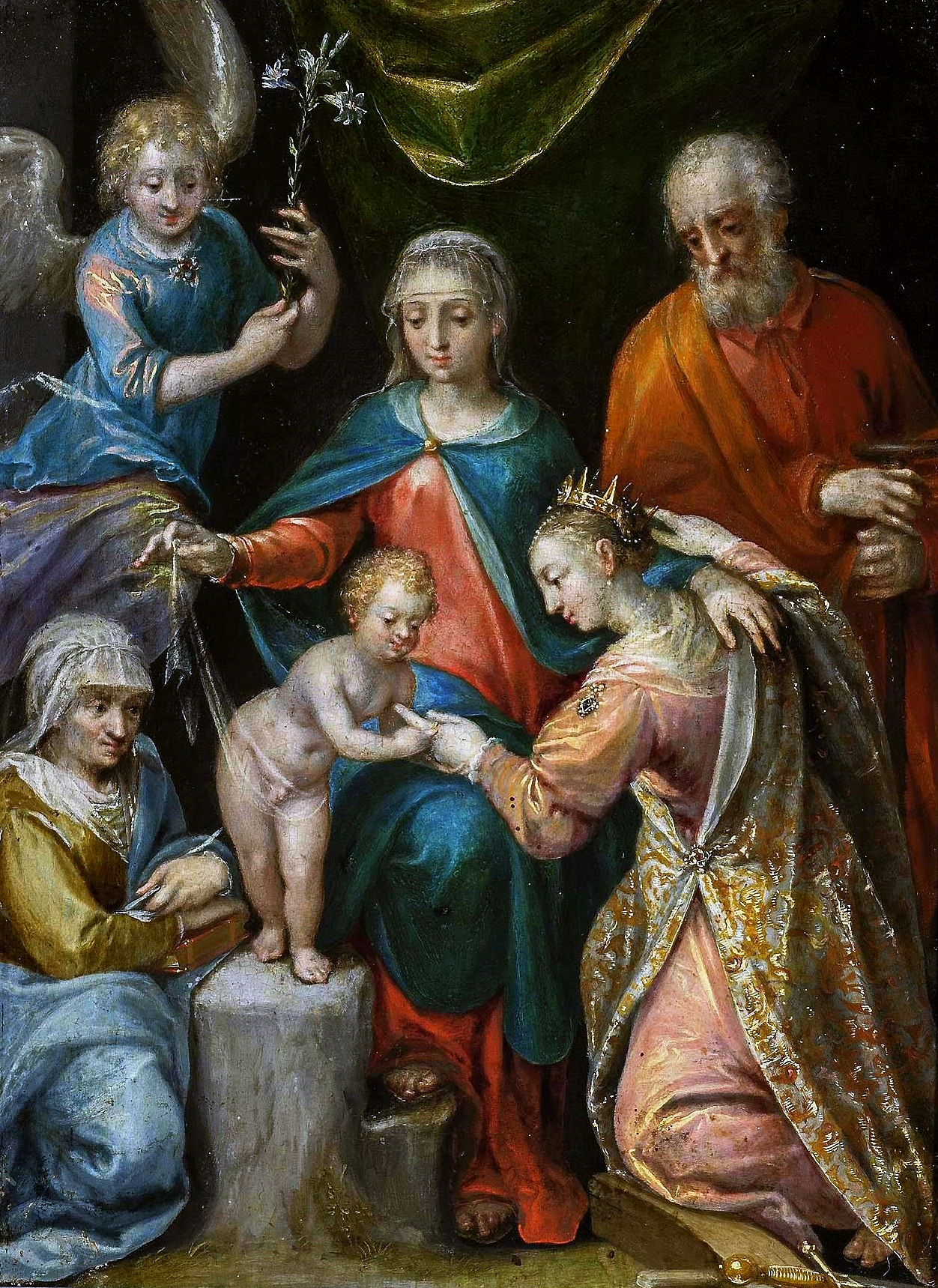
Marriage of St. Catherine

Dirck de Quade van Ravesteyn (1565 – 1620), was a Dutch Golden Age painter active in the court of Rudolf II, Holy Roman Emperor.

== Biography ==
He was probably born in the Hague where his father Claes was a member of a family of artists. He is considered an important member of the internationally known Prague school of Dutch and Flemish painting under Emperor Rudolf II (who reigned from 1576 to his death in 1612). Quade van Ravesteyn was successful enough to own his own house in the Malá Strana in 1598. He was also recorded lending large sums of money in the same period, possibly to subcontract commissions or enable other artists to purchase properties. After Rudolf's death in 1612 he was succeeded by Matthias who died in 1619 and in that year Quade van Ravesteyn was mentioned as a creditor of both emperors, though he may have returned to the Netherlands by then.

Like other Rudolfine artists, his works have been mostly dispersed over the world, with only a few remaining in Prague in the National Gallery there.
