= Bálint Kiss =

Hungarian painter and graphic artist

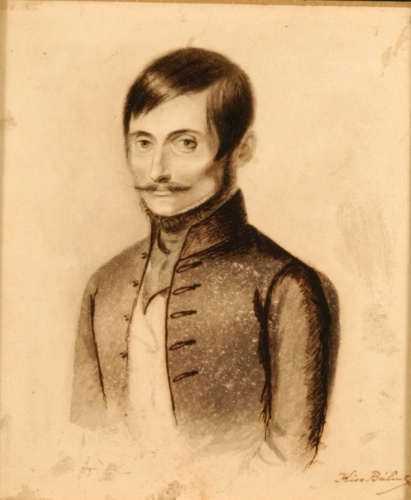
Self-portrait (date unknown)

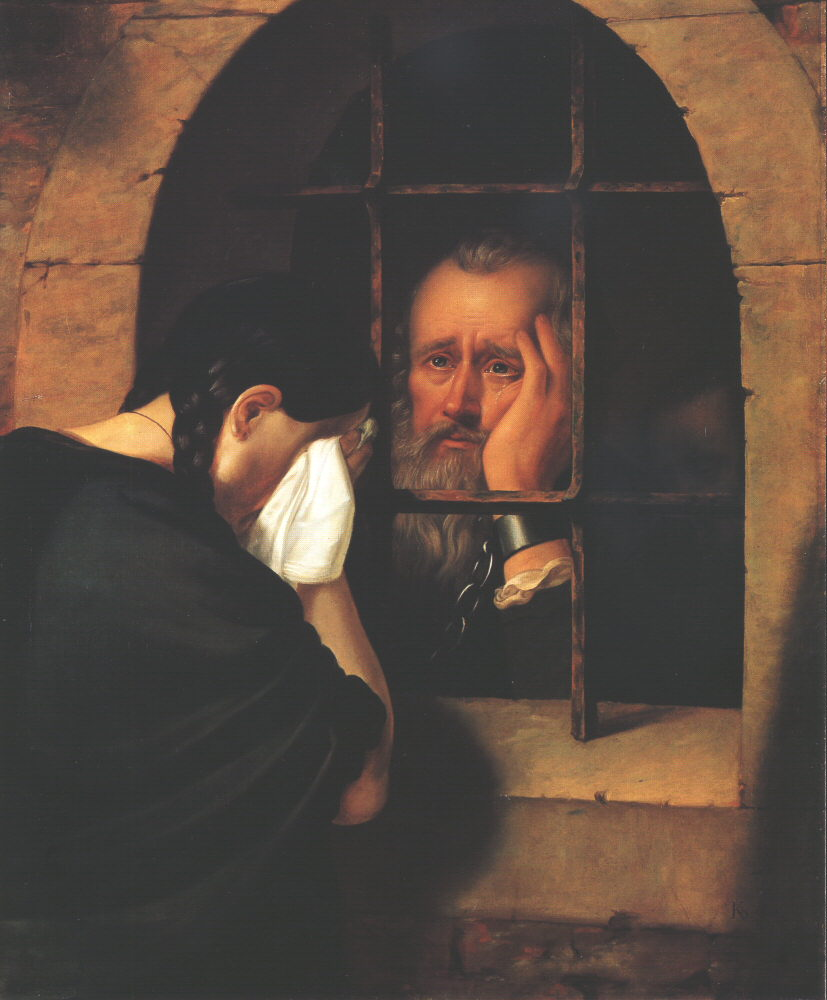
János Jablonczai Pethes Says Goodbye... (1846). Pethes was one of the 300 Protestant pastors sentenced to death during the Kuruc Rebellion.

Bálint Kiss (29 December 1802 – 27 January 1868) was a Hungarian painter and graphic artist.

== Biography ==
Kiss was born on 29 December 1802 in Szentes. His father, also named Bálint, was a well-known Presbyterian minister and educator. he attended the public schools in Debrecen and was enrolled at the Academy of Fine Arts Vienna in 1827. He returned to Szentes in 1830 and attempted to make a living as a portrait painter.

He didn't receive enough orders, so he became an itinerant painter, eventually settling in Debrecen in 1834, where he painted landscapes and altarpieces in addition to portraits. He also made sketches of the actors at the National Theatre which appeared in the journal Honművész (National Artist). His first exhibition was at the Art Association of Pest in 1840. Three years later, he was appointed to be one of the art conservators at the original location of the Hungarian National Museum.

In 1846, he created one of his best-known works, János Jablonczai Pethes Says goodbye to his Daughter at the Window of the Dungeon at Leopoldvár in 1674. Although the critics were not impressed, it proved to be very popular with the public. Presumably, this was a factor in his promotion to Curator of the gallery in 1847. In this position, he helped to organize the museum's first major art exhibition after its relocation.

In 1850, following the Revolution, he was dismissed due to his participation in various reform movements. He continued to work while in his forced retirement, producing a four-volume collection of lithographs in 1853 and a great variety of works on Hungarian history. In 1861, he was reinstated during Archduke Albrecht's Germanization campaign, but never truly attained his former status.

Kiss died on 27 January 1868 in Pest.
