= Oszkar Tordai Schilling =

Oszkar Tordai Schilling was a Hungarian artist who mostly used etchings and coal drawings. He was born in Kolozsvar, Austria-Hungary (nowadays Cluj-Napoca in Romania) in 1880.

His most productive period was in the 1920s. His well-known pieces are "Entombment" (acquired and exhibited by the British Museum), "Samaritaine" and "Lámpafénynél". Some of his pieces are sought and collected at private and public institutions such as Yale University.
