= Hubert van Ravesteyn =

Dutch painter

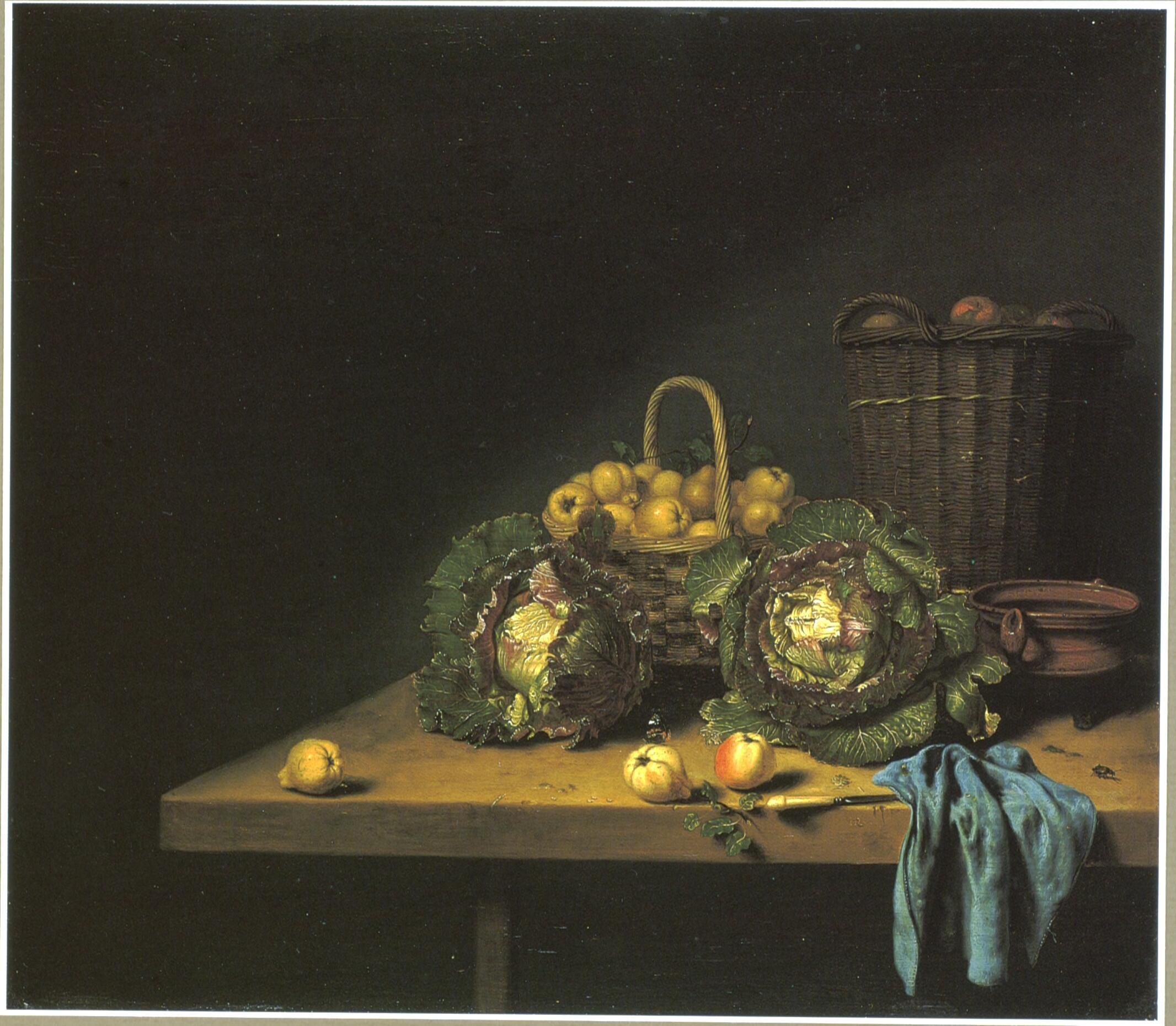
Still life with fruit and vegetables, Dordrechts Museum.

Hubert van Ravesteyn was a Dutch painter of interiors and cattle, the son of Herman van Ravesteyn. He was born at Dordrecht in 1638 and died there between 1683 and 1691. He was married 22 December 1669 in Papendrecht to Catharina van Meurs, with whom he had 8 children. His pictures, signed with the monogram H.R., are painted in a brownish tone in the manner of Cornelis Saftleven, Hendrik Martenszoon Sorgh, and others. In his early pictures (as for example the still-life of 1664 in the Museum at Amsterdam) the painting is more carefully coloured.
