= István Regős =

- Born: 1954 (age 71–72); Budapest, Hungary
- Education: Hungarian University of Fine Arts
- Website: www.regos.co.hu/istvan-en

István Regős (born c. 1954) is a well-known Hungarian painter, artist.

== Biography ==
- 1969-73 – Secondary School for Fine & Applied Arts, Budapest
- 1973-74 – Hungarian Contractor Company – ornamental paintworks in Budapest: Museum of Fine Art, Mansions on Andrássy Avenue, The Houses of Parliament, Institute for the Blind
- 1975-80 – Hungarian College of Fine Art, Budapest (today: Hungarian University of Fine Arts) (studies under Lajos Sváby). Diploma in painting.
- From 1986 – Member of the Studio of Young Artists, the Society of Hungarian Painters, the Workshop of Graphic Arts in Szentendre, and founding member of the ARTeria Gallery in Szentendre.
- From 1973 – Lives and works in Szentendre.
- 1998 – With his wife, Anna Regős founded the Palmetta Design Gallery in Szentendre.
- 2013 – Palmetta Design & Textile Art Gallery opens in Budapest.

== Selected solo exhibitions ==
- 1985 - Vajda Lajos Studio Gallery, Szentendre
- 1987 - Childhood, Club of Young Artists, Budapest
- 1989 – Reform Age, Studio of Young Artists Gallery, Budapest
- 1992 – Windy Times, Fészek Művészklub, Budapest Gallery Várfok, Budapest
- 1994 – Gallery Várfok, Budapest
- 1995 – Gallery of the Szentendre Art Colony
- 1996 – Gallery Várfok, Budapest
- 2000 – ARTéria Gallery, Szentendre
- 2002 – Gallery Várfok, Budapest
- 2005 – Szentendre Picture Gallery, Szentendre
- 2006 – Időutazás, Gallery Várfok, Budapest Raiffeisen Gallery, Budapest
- 2008 – Bartók 32 Gallery, Budapest
- 2009 – 20’21 Gallery, Budapest Europ’art, Geneva (CH)
- 2010 – Gyulai Várszínház Gallery, Gyula Art Fair, Kunsthalle, Budapest
- 2012 – BTM Budapest Gallery, Budapest

== Selected group exhibitions ==
- 1983-2002 – Szentendrei Tárlatok
- 1986-1991 – Stúdiós kiállítások
- 1988 – Szaft - A V:L:S: és meghívott vendégeinek közös kiállítása, Ernst Múzeum, Budapest
- 1990 – Hungarian Painting, Ystad, Sweden
- 1990 – Six Hungarian Artists, Seoul, South-Korea
- 1990 – Easter-European Painting, De Dolen, Rotterdam, The Netherlands
- 1991 – Budapest - Contemporary Hungarian Art, Dublin, Írország (IE)
- 1992 – Kortárs magyar festészeti kiállítás, Experimental Art Foundation, Adelaide, Ausztrália (AU)
- 1994 – Festival International de la Peinture, Cagnes-sur-Mer, Franciaország (FR)
- 1995 – Piranesi, Szépművészeti Múzeum, Budapest
- 1997 – Magyar Szalon, Műcsarnok, Budapest
- 1997 – Olaj-vászon, Műcsarnok, Budapest
- 1997 – Budapest 125, Budapest Galéria, Budapest
- 1999 – Kortárs Magyar Művészet, Europalia Festival, Brüsszel (BE)
- 2001 – Dialógus, Műcsarnok, Budapest
- 2001 – A XX. század ujjlenyomata, Budapesti Történeti Múzeum, Budapest
- 2003 – Metropolisz, Várfok Galéria XO terem, Budapest
- 2004 – Reflexiók, Várfok Galéria XO terem, Budapest
- 2005 – ARC poetika, Várfok Galéria XO terem, Budapest
- 2006 – Az út 1956–2006, Műcsarnok, Budapest
- 2007 – Akkor és most - válogatás a Fiatal Képzőművészek Stúdiójának archívumából, Millenáris Teátrum, Budapest
- 2008 – Kép a képben, Várfok Galéria, Budapest
- 2009 – Tolerance In Art - szlovák és magyar művészek kiállítása, Danubiana, Szlovákia (SK)
- 2010 – 11 év - Válogatás a Ferenczy Múzeum új szerzeményeiből, Szentendrei Képtár
- 2010 – Hommage á Puskás Öcsi, Hotel Boscolo, New York Palota, Budapest
- 2010 – Kapcsolat 2010, Kecskemét, Nagybánya
- 2010 – Különleges, MeMoArt Galéria, Budapest
- 2011 – Hommage á Liszt Ferenc, Eötvös 10 Kulturális Színtér, Budapest
- 2011 – ART MARKET Budapest, Millenáris
- 2011 – Hungart Ösztöndíj beszámoló kiállítás, Olof Palme-ház, Budapest
- 2011 – Lineart, Gent, Belgium (BE)
- 2012 – ART PARIS Art Fair, Grand Palais, Paris (FR)
- 2013 – ARTPLACC, Tihany
- 2014 – ARTPLACC, Tihany
- 2014 – Hungaricons - Kárpáti Collection, Várkert Bazár, Budapest
- 2014 – Ein blicke - Künstler aus Szentendre, Atelier Schwab, Wertheim am Main, Germany (DE)
- 2015 – Here and Now - Fine arts. National Salon 2015. Hall of Art, Budapest

== Awards, scholarships ==
- 1986, 1988 – Awards of the Studio of Young Artists
- 1988-1990 – Szőnyi-scholarship
- 1991 – I. Grotesque Competition - Main Prize
- 1992 – Repülés-szárnyalás exhibition - Main Prize
- 1992 – Scholarship of the City of Salzburg
- 1996 – Scholarship of the City of Salzburg
- 2004 – Munkácsy Mihály-díj
- 2010 – Hungart Scholarship

== Artworks in private and public collections (selection) ==
- Ferenczy Museum, Szentendre (HU)
- Memorial Museum of István Széchenyi, Nagycenk (HU)
- Tragor Ignác Museum, Vác (HU)
- Collection of László Károly, Basel (CH)
- Collection of László Károly, Veszprém (HU)
- Galerie Bartha, Basel (CH)
- Graphisoft Park Collection, Budapest (HU)
- Budapest Bank Collection, Budapest (HU)
- Raiffeissen Bank Collection, Budapest (HU)
