= György Rózsahegyi =

- Born: 21 November 1940; Budapest, Hungary
- Died: 28 June 2010 (aged 69); Budapest, Hungary
- Occupations: Caricaturist, painter

György Rózsahegyi (1940–2010) was a Hungarian caricaturist and painter.

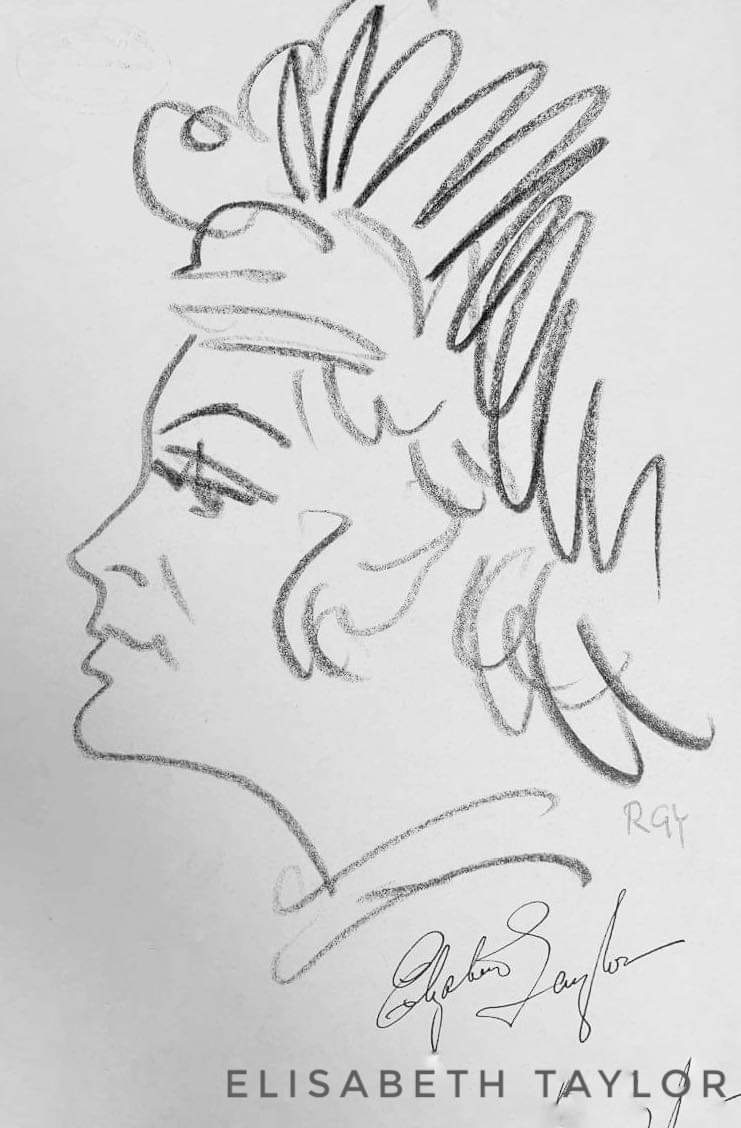
Caricature of Liz Taylor

== His life ==
György Rózsahegyi was born in Budapest, Hungary on 21 November 1940. His father, Jenő Rózsahegyi was a world-wide known, professional boxing champion, who was running a reputable sport school in Budapest before WW2 and whose hobby was painting.

His son followed him in both, however an injury stopped him from further sport successes. Nevertheless, drawing become the passion of Rózsahegyi as a child; he began making portraits of almost everyone who crossed his way. Becoming aware of the talent of his son, his father put the paintbrush down and handed him over his painting accessories, so he also picked up painting at the age of 14 and carried out his artistic education with the help of his masters—János Kmetty among others.

It was quite early that fine-arts people realised his unique caricature style, so he changed his job as a graphic artist to half time, in order that he could fulfill the orders of the largest Hungarian dailies as freelance.

Besides his activity as a caricaturist, Rózsahegyi was continuously involved in painting, he created landscapes, still lifes, nude paintings, and portraits of course. His paintings and caricatures were shown to the public in 40 exhibitions, and he himself participated in numerous events, where the spectators could admire how one can create a caricature which perfectly captures the character of the model without precise planning, with a few lines within a few seconds.

== His work, his style ==
György Rózsahegyi developed a unique caricature style, with the help of which he could reflect the characteristics of a person based on the first impression within seconds. He made a lot of efforts to draw every single celebrity that showed up in Hungary, and those who did not were captured by him during his trips abroad, like the ones to the Munich and Los Angeles Olympics. This way, he managed to draw countless world famous personalities, from Liz Taylor to Roger Moore, from Pelé to Franz Beckenbauer, from Alberto Moravia to Pablo Neruda, and from Helmut Schmidt to Fidel Castro.

Besides his activity as a caricaturist, György Rózsahegyi was continuously involved in painting, he created landscapes, still lifes, nude paintings, and portraits of course. During his career as a painter, he had the most important personalities of the Hungarian cultural life as models, like Lajos Kassák, Hilda Gobbi, Boris Palotai, Ferencz Karinthy, Tibor Déry and many others.

His paintings and caricatures were shown to the public in 40 exhibitions, and György Rózsahegyi himself participated in numerous events, where the spectators could admire how one can create a caricature which perfectly captures the character of the model without precise planning, with a few lines within a few seconds.

== His books ==
- Maszk nélkül, 1967
- Új magyar parnasszus, 1973
- Skalpok és Trofeák, 1982
- Karikatúrastadion, 1983
