= László Dombrovszky =

László Dombrovszky (born Stanislaw Dombrowski; 7 August 1894 – 30 April 1982) was a Russian painter.

== Family and artistic training ==
He was born in Orhei, near Kishinev, Bessarabia (Eastern Moldova). His father, Sergej Dombrowski, was a Polish wholesaler and forest engineer; his mother, Maria Aranov, was a Russian-Jewish physician. The family moved to Vologda where Stanislaw spent his childhood. He graduated in Nyiznij Novgorod. His Western oriented parents sent him to Paris, to where finally his mother helped him to save him from the bloody events of the 1917 Revolution. The other members of the family, the parents and the two sisters, including their husbands became victims of the revolution's insanity.

Stanislaw Dombrowski spent longer time in France, Italy, Sweden, Denmark, and Bulgaria. In his youth it was Paris that opened him the path to become an individual artist. In the French capital among others he became the disciple of Henri Matisse and Othon Friesz. He visited the Julian Academy and was attracted by the École de Paris (School of Paris) international artists' spirituality that is determinative in the development of the artist's oeuvre.

== Career ==
He settled in Hungary in 1921. He nationalized himself in order to make easier to integrate and living. He changed his name to László Dombrovszky. In 1924 together with István Szőnyi and Róbert Berény he was one of the founders of the Artist Colony in the village of Zebegény. However his French-school training differentiated, separated him from the Post-Nagybánya school. Among the Hungarian artists the paintings of Béla Czóbel and Róbert Berény affected him. These years he sought the balance between the schools of the (École de Paris) and Poszt-Nagybánya. In the sixtieth his youthfully soaring spirit shows similarities with Georges Braque and Matisse.

In his old age his art turned gradually into a more abstract direction that is on a basis of musical effects. At the same time, in their spirit the youthfully soaring works that Dombrovszky painted in the 1960s show – at one remove anyway – a relationship with Braque and Matisse, who matured from a once-time Fauve youngster into a classical master. Matisse, too, had in the early 20th century a private school that was frequented by young artists from Central and Eastern Europe. In his old age his art turned step by step to a more abstract direction based on musical effects.

"His more individual style developed from the 1950s onwards," said Lajos Németh, "in his art, structure became strong; he transcribed motifs in a more decorative manner, for instance with many arabesque-like elements. The contour lines played a linking role. The vital element in his art was rhythm, namely the rhythm of colours and lines, and the composition of his pictures was based on these main traits. He consciously endeavoured to obtain musical effects; many of his pictures could have borne the title 'Improvisation', also in the musical sense of the word." In fact, he played the violin and piano wonderfully; as relaxation, he was able to improvise music for hours. In 1969 with an interview given to Aliz Torday he said the following that can be considered as his ars poetica. He was an artist of few words: "For me art is not a logical or speculative world," he once declared "but is emotional, like poetry. The truth of the artwork is different from everyday truth. At the same time truth – authenticity, in the sense of similitude – is not important. Every work of art has its own laws. The condition for creation is, however, always humane: it comes from a 'pure wellspring'. He then quotes the classical concept: 'The picture is always a complete whole.' One must never take out one part and look at it separately. It is like an orchestral work, in which one does not listen to the instruments separately, but together, and only in this way do they produce the desired effect ... There is no life without music and colour, as the sound and colour are one of the appearing forms of the existence."

During the Nazi occupation of Hungary he saved human lives. He had close contact with Vilmos Forgács, one of Raoul Wallenberg's staff members who got Dombrovszky acquainted with the Swedish diplomat. So this is how it happened among others the portrait of Wallenberg was painted. Raoul Wallenberg sat himself as a model in September 1944, Budapest. It is the only known authentic existing piece of art of Raoul Wallenberg. Wallenberg posed only three times for his portrait (this is known from his diary kept by the Soviets after his death later on given back to Wallenberg's family), so Dombrovszky could not finish it as Wallenberg was abducted by the Soviets, January 1945. Today the portrait is preserved in Gripsholm Castle near Stockholm (Statens Porträttsamling på Gripsholm, presenting important personalities from the Swedish history). The portrait is represented in the permanent exhibition of the United States Holocaust Memorial Museum.

László Dombrovszky died in Budapest, 30 April 1982. His pictures can be found in Hungary, France, Germany, Switzerland, Denmark, Sweden (Statens Porträttsamling på Gripsholm), in Italy, etc. both in private and public collections.

During one period, between the two World Wars, he earned a living from painting portraits, primarily in Italy; the majority of these pictures as well as the works that remained in his atelier in Paris were, regrettably, lost after 1945: no traces of them could be found. From time to time his works come to light at auctions or in consequence of an unexpected event.

== Solo exhibitions ==
- 1944: Tamás Gallery[11], Budapest
- 1961: Rákóczi Museum, Sárospatak
- 1967: István Csók Gallery, Budapest
- 1973: Ferenc Móra Museum, Szeged.
- 1974 and 1977: István Csók Gallery, Budapest
- 1984: Bottyán Vak Museum, Vác
- 1985: Vigadó Gallery, Budapest
- 2005: Budapest Gallery
- 2006: Zebegény, István Szőnyi Museum
- 2008: Győr, Esterházy Palace

== Main collective exhibitions ==
- 1942: Tamás Gallery: Exhibition of Hungarian Watercolourists (Berény, Czóbel, Barcsay, Márffy, Huber Dési, Egry, Elekfy, Noémi Ferenczy, Ferenc Hatvany, Hincz, Kmetty, Pohárnok, Endre Vadász)
- 1942: (10 October–25 October) National Salon: Autumn Show – Exhibition by the Members
- Up to 1968, he participated regularly in the exhibitions of fine arts organised at the Palace of Exhibitions, Budapest
- 1946: 1st Exhibition of the Hungarian Movement for Fine Arts, Ernst Museum, Budapest
- 1947: Hungarian Art Weeks. Representative Fine Arts Exhibition, Ernst Museum, Budapest; 2nd Free National Exhibition by the Free Organisation of Hungarian Artists, Metropolitan Gallery, Budapest
- 1951: (4 November–2 December) 2nd Hungarian Fine Arts Exhibition, Palace of Exhibitions, Budapest
- 1957: 3rd National Fine Arts Exhibition, Ottó Hermann Museum, Miskolc
- 1960: Among Working People. An Exhibition of Art. Ernst Museum, Budapest
- 1964: Winter Exhibition, Székesfehérvár.
- 1968 (January) Among Working People. An Exhibition of Art. Ernst Museum, Budapest
- 1968: 11th Hungarian Fine Arts Exhibition, Ernst Museum, Budapest
- 1968: 4th Lake Balaton Summer Exhibition, Balaton Museum, Keszthely; Exhibition of Purchases Made by the State, Palace of Exhibitions, Budapest
- 1970: 2nd National Aquarelle Bienniale, Eger.
- 1972: (25 June–22 July) 3rd Debrecen National Summer Exhibition '72, Déri Museum, Debrecen
- 1973: (22 July–16 September) 14th Szeged Summer Exhibition, Ferenc Móra Museum, Szeged
- 1974: (20 August–20 September) 4th National Aquarelle Biennale, Eger
- 1976: (20 August–20 September) 5th National Aquarelle Biennale, Eger
- 1978: (27 January–19 February) Painting '77. An Exhibition by the Painters' Division of the Association of Hungarian Fine Artists and Applied Artists
- 1980: Fine Arts Collection of the János Damjanich Museum (1970–1980), Szolnok
- 1980: Exhibition of Contemporary Fine Arts and Applied Arts, Szolnok County Museums Directorate, János Damjanich Museum, Szolnok

== Works in public and private collections ==
Budapest, Municipal Picture Gallery • Janus Pannonius Museum, Pécs • Hungarian National Gallery, Budapest • Statens Porträttgalerie, Gripsholm, Sweden • Numerous Hungarian and foreign collections . United States Holocaust Memorial Museum, Washington

== Bibliography ==
- Lajos Németh, introduction of the catalogue, Csók Gallery, Budapest, 1967,
- Sándor Láncz, Művészet (Art), 1967/No.11.
- Lajos Németh, Current exhibitions, New Hungarian Quarterly, 1967/27.
- Exhibition calendar, in Művészet (Art), 1974/Nr.5.
- József Vadas, Trees in main roles, Élet és Irodalom (Life and Literature), 25 May 1974.
- János Frank, Introduction of the catalogue of the Csók Gallery, Budapest, 1977
- Lajos Németh, Introduction of the catalogue, Vác, Greek church, exhibition hall, 25 May 1984
- András Csanády, Introduction of the catalogue of the Vigadó Gallery, Budapest, 1985
- Ottó Mezei-Ninette Dombrovszky, László Dombrovszky Exhibition catalogue, Budapest Gallery 2005
- Ember, Mária: 'Az ismeretlen Wallenberg-portré története' [The History of an Unknown Wallenberg Portrait], Köztársaság, 29 May 1992 issue, pp. 82–83; idem: Wallenberg Budapesten [Wallenberg in Budapest], Budapest: Városháza, 2000, pp. 47–48
