= Adrienn Henczné Deák =

Hungarian painter (1890–1956)

- Born: Adrienn Deák; 1890; Budapest, Hungary
- Died: 1956 (aged 65–66); Budapest

Adrienn Henczné Deák (Budapest, 1890 – Budapest, 1956) was a Hungarian painter. The Hungarian National Gallery hosts her oil painting "Csendélet".
