= Valéria Dénes =

Hungarian painter (1877–1915)

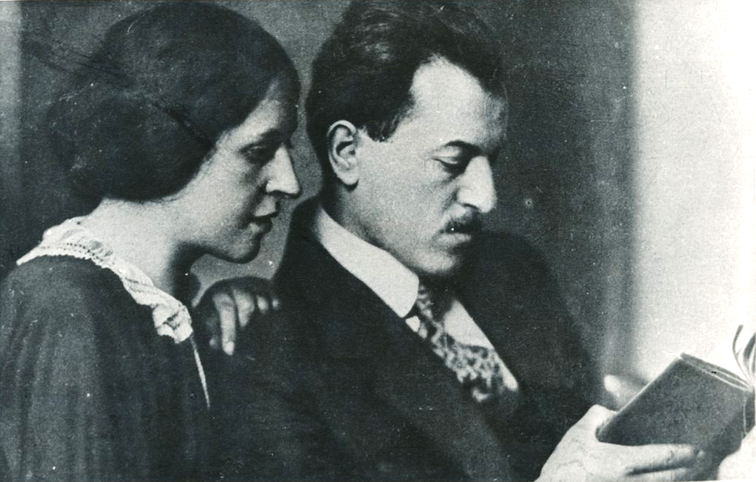
- Born: November 2, 1877; Budapest, Hungary
- Died: July 18, 1915 (aged 37); Pécs, Hungary
- Known for: Painting
- Movement: Cubism
- Spouse: Sándor Galimberti

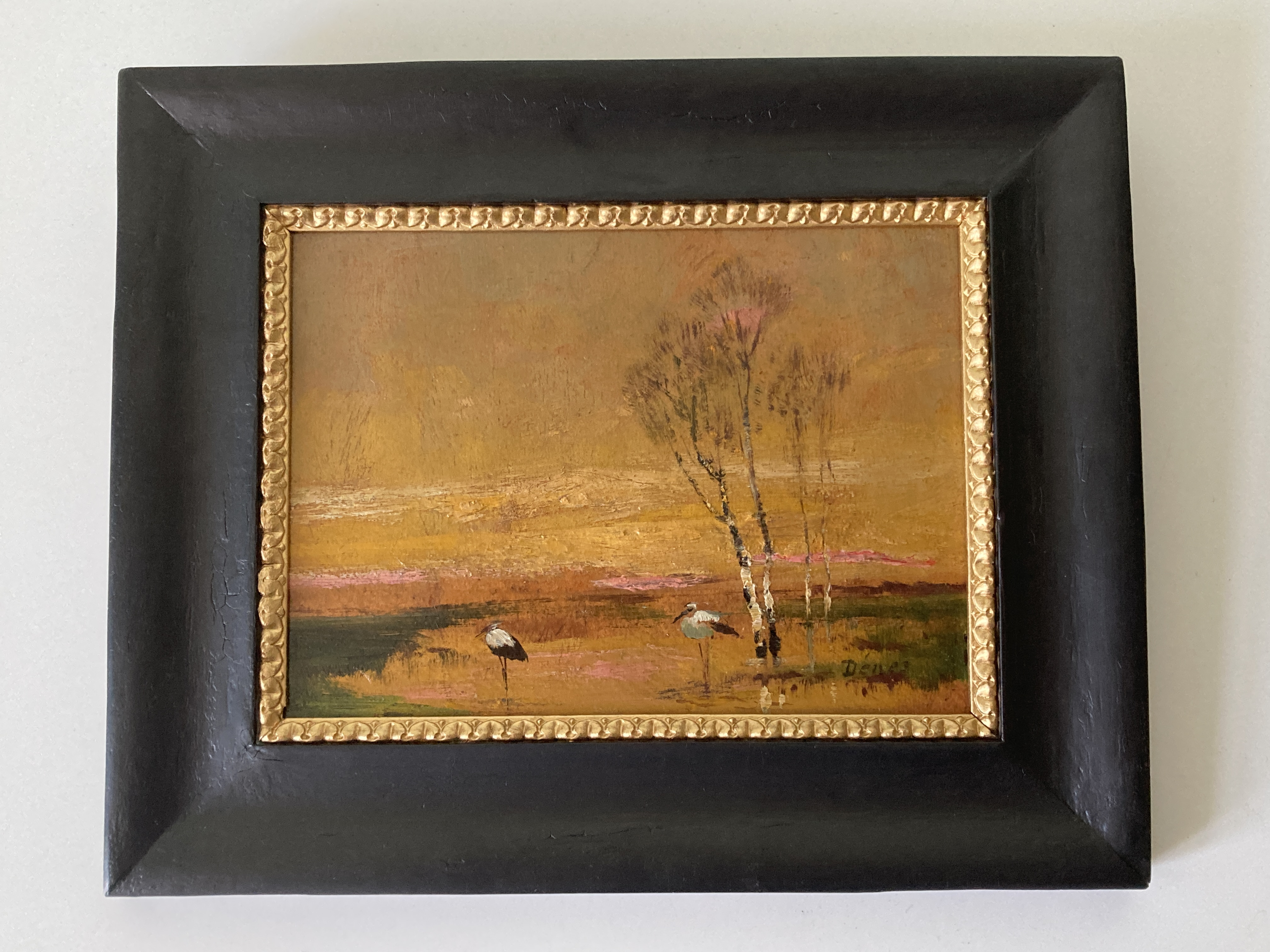
Landscape with storks - Oil on cardboard, 23.5 × 17.5 cm (excluding frame). This work is thought to be an early piece by Valéria Dénes.

Valéria Dénes (1877 in Budapest – 1915 in Pécs) was a Hungarian painter. The wife of Sándor Galimberti, she was one of the first Hungarian cubists.

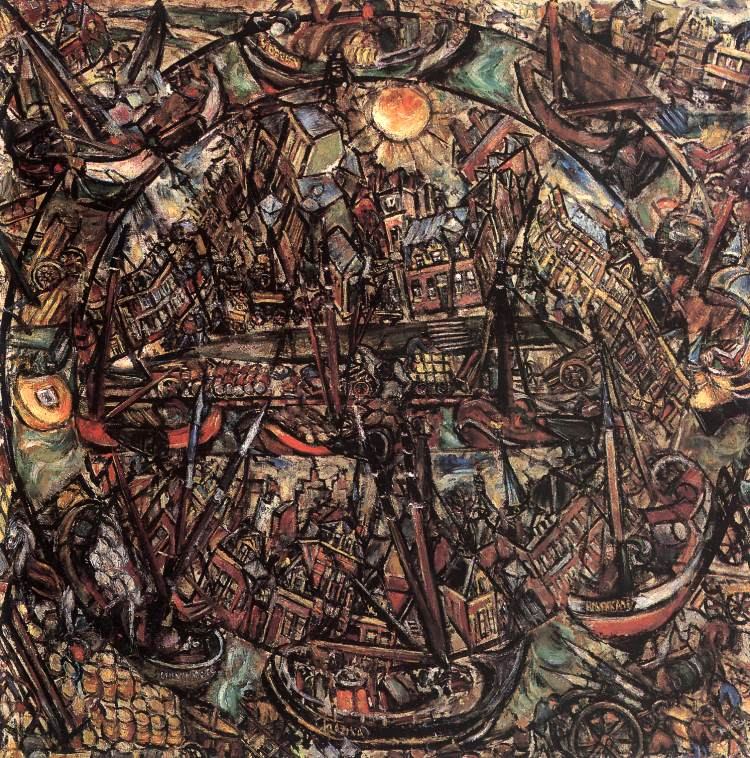
Dutch harbour (1914–15)
