= Charles Roka =

Hungarian painter

Charles Roka (Róka Károly; 1912–1999) was a Hungarian painter living in Norway whose name became synonymous with an excess of artistic kitsch.

Roka was born in Hungary in 1912. After he finished his studies on the Academy of Fine Arts in Budapest he went on a European journey. In 1937 he finally settled in Norway, and lived in Bærum, outside Oslo until his death.

In 1950 he painted his first picture of the half-naked Gipsy Girl whom he had seen in Marseille a few years earlier. It is Roka's numerous variations of this Gypsy Girl which made his financial success as a painter. His other favourite subjects were Hungarian folklore, especially Gipsy people dancing csárdás and portraits.

Roka had several exhibitions in Madrid, Barcelona, and Lausanne and he was very popular among the average Scandinavian people. In 1982 illness stopped him working. In 2003 Haugar Vestfold Kunstmuseum held a summer exhibition under the title Prince of Kitsch displaying about 80 of his works. It was the first time that a venerable art gallery let Roka's works within its walls.
