= Balázs Diószegi =

Hungarian painter

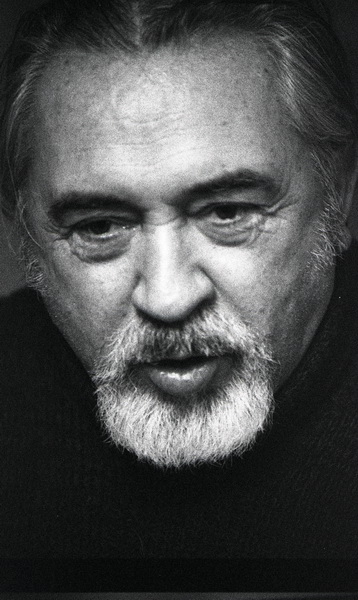
Balázs Diószegi

Balázs Diószegi (16 November 1914 – 2 February 1999) was a Hungarian painter and a nobleman.

His works are dominated by the colour black and the contrast of black and white, in contrast with Menyhért Tóth's mostly white paintings.

He had no children and wife. He died in 1999.
