= Gyula Derkovits =

Hungarian painter and graphic artist (1894–1934)

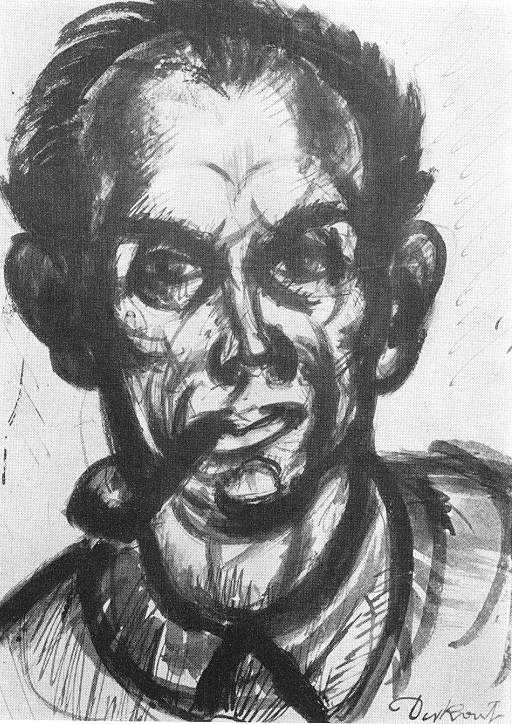
Self-portrait with Pipe (1926)

Gyula Derkovits (13 April 1894, Szombathely, 18 June 1934, Budapest) was a Hungarian painter and graphic artist whose work shows elements of Expressionism, Cubism and Constructivism.

== Biography ==
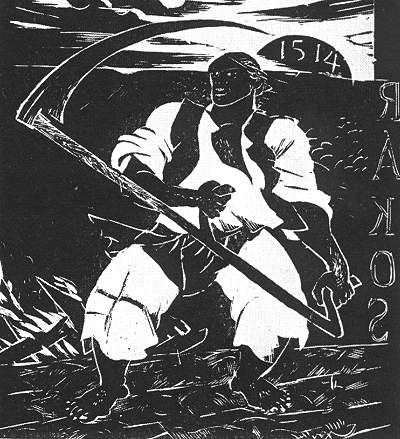
Insurgent Peasant, from the Dózsa woodcut series (1928)

His father was a master carpenter and, despite showing some early artistic talent, he was forced to pursue the same trade. A friend who was a sign painter gave him his first drawing lessons, against his family's wishes. Displeased with that situation, he fled from his family by volunteering to serve in World War I.

This proved to be an unfortunate decision, as he was wounded at the front, leaving him with a paralyzed left hand and a lung problem which became tuberculosis. In 1916, he moved to Budapest where he supported himself with a disability pension and, ironically, by doing some carpentry. In 1918, he joined the Hungarian Communist Party and remained a member until 1930, when membership became too dangerous.

During this time, he learned to draw and paint at various night schools until 1918, when Károly Kernstok agreed to take him as a student, free of charge, at the Nyergesújfalu art colony and taught him copper engraving in addition to painting. Unfortunately, the many changes in government disrupted pension payments and he was forced to return to manual labor, which was increasingly too difficult for him. As a result, he moved to Vienna in 1923, where he was able to find sufficient work doing paintings and etchings and had a successful exhibition at the Weihburg Gallery. He lived there for three years, then returned to Budapest.

In 1928, his reputation was secured by a series of twelve woodcuts depicting the peasant revolt of 1514 (led by György Dózsa), despite having been done at the behest of the Communist Party. After 1930, his style became increasingly personal and eccentric. Tempera was his preferred medium then and his paintings, with subjects from daily life, became larger; almost monumental. He also worked in clay and wood sculpture. He died, aged only forty, after a series of illnesses.

Several streets have been named after him and a "Derkovits Art Scholarship" has been presented since 1955.

== Selected paintings ==
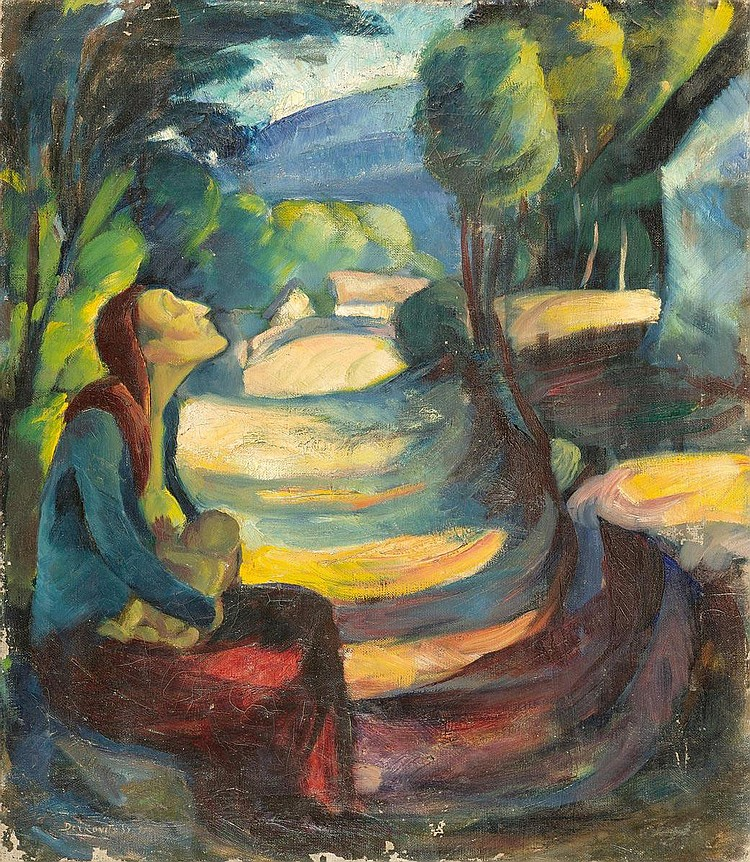
Mother and Child (1917)

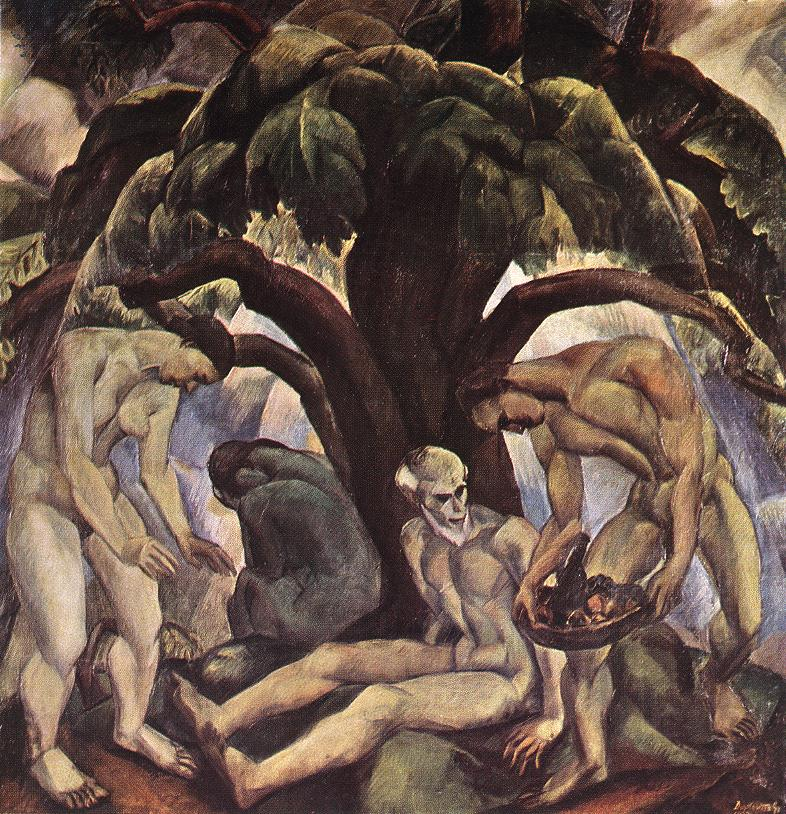
Below a Big Tree (1922)

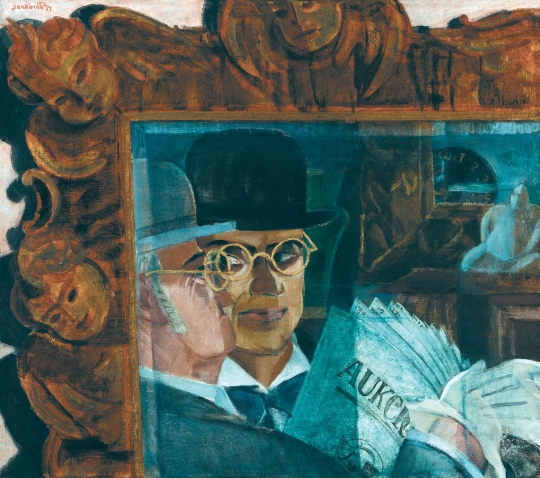
Auction (1930)

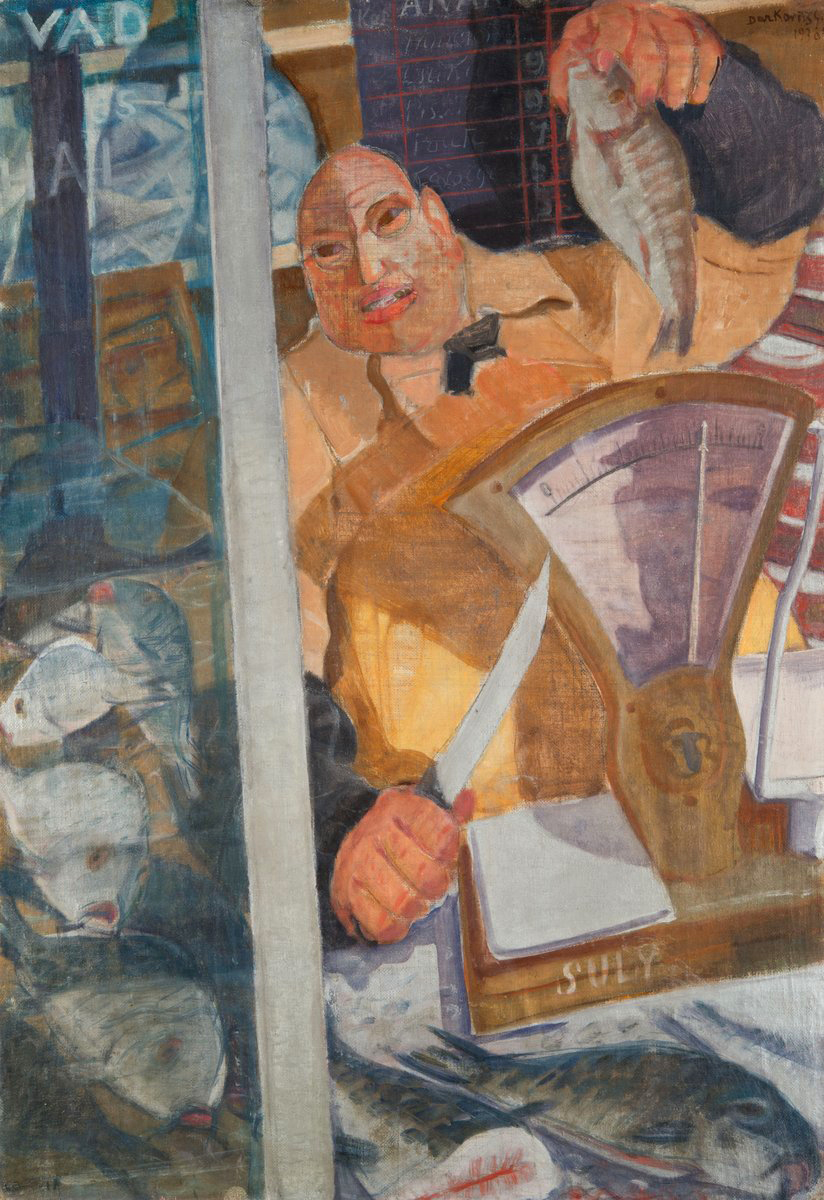
Fishmonger (1930)

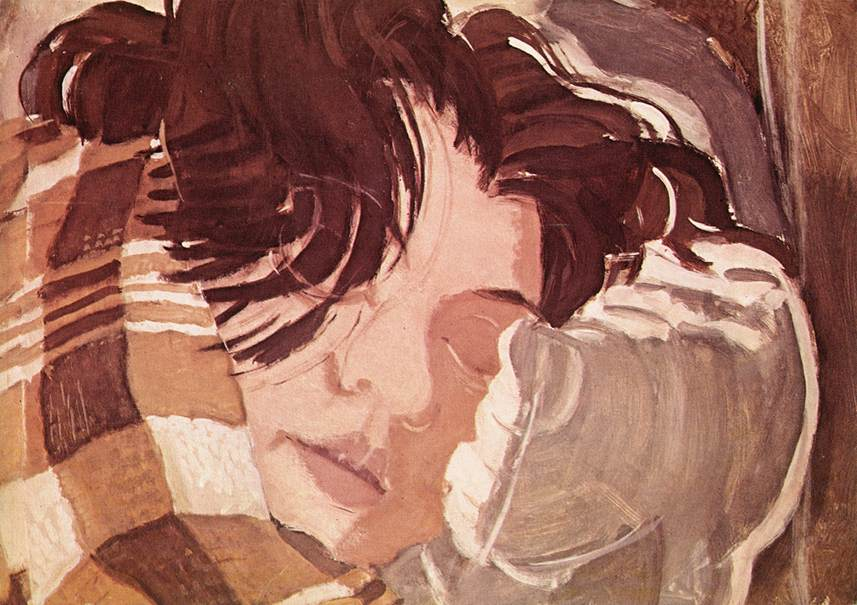
Sleeping Woman (1932)
