= List of Hungarian women artists =

This is a list of women artists who were born in Hungary or whose artworks are closely associated with that country.

== A ==
- Rita Ackermann (born 1968), Hungarian-American painter
- Margit Anna (1913–1991), painter
- Lili Árkayné Sztehló (1897–1959), painter, stained glass artist

== B ==
- Suzanne Balkanyi (1922–2005), Hungarian-born French painter, etcher
- Mária Barta (1897–1969), painter
- Júlia Báthory (1901–2000), glass designer
- Éva Bednay (1927–2017), painter, textile artist
- Lilla Bodor (born 1979), painter
- Ritta Boemm (1868–1948), painter

== C ==
- Marianne Csaky (active since 1990s), writer, sculptor

== D ==
- Tissa David (1921–2012), pioneering female animator
- Anette Dawn (born 1978), ceramist, make-up artist
- Adrienn Henczné Deák (1890–1956), painter
- Dora de Pedery-Hunt (1913–2008), Hungarian-Canadian sculptor, medallist
- Valéria Dénes (1877–1915), Cubist painter
- Orshi Drozdik (born 1946), Hungarian-American installation artist

== F ==
- Éva Farkas (born 1960), tapestry artist
- Rose Feller (born 1975), multimedia artist
- Magda Frank (1914–2010), sculptor

== G ==
- Ilka Gedő (1921–1985), painter, graphic artist
- Jolan Gross-Bettelheim (1900–1972), painter, graphic artist
- Margit Gréczi (born 1941), painter
- Gitta Gyenes (1888–1960), porcelain painter

== H ==
- Agnes Hegedüs (born 1964), new media artist
- Vera Harsányi (1919–1994), swimmer, painter

== K ==
- Judith Karasz (1912–1977), photographer
- Dóra Keresztes (born 1953), painter, illustrator, graphic artist, animator
- Ilona Keserü Ilona (born 1933), painter, educator
- Katalin Keserü (born 1946), artist, educator
- Edith Kiss (1905–1966), sculptor, painter
- Margit Kovács (1902–1977), ceramist, sculptor
- Elza Kövesházi-Kalmár (1876–1956), sculptor
- Ilona Kronstein (1897–1948), painter

== L ==
- Katalin Ladik (born 1942), poet, performance artist, actress
- Klára Lenz (1924–2013), tapestry artist
- Vilma Lwoff-Parlaghy (1863–1923), portrait painter

== M ==
- Eszter Mattioni (1902–1993), painter
- Dóra Maurer (born 1937), multidisciplinary artist
- Vera Molnár (1924–2023), pioneering Hungarian-born French computer artist
- Zsuzsa Mathe (born 1964), painter

== O ==
- Lili Ország (1926–1978), painter

== P ==
- Marta Pan, (1923–2008), Hungarian-born French sculptor

== R ==
- Zsuzsi Roboz (1929–2012), painter
- Lívia Rusz (1930–2020), graphic artist, illustrator

== S ==
- Erzsébet Schaár (1905–1975), sculptor
- Marianna Schmidt (1918–2005), Hungarian-Canadian printmaker, painter
- Margit Sebők (1939–2000), Hungarian painter and educator
- Kate Seredy (1899–1975), Hungarian-born writer, illustrator
- Susan Silas (active since 1980s), artist, writer
- Agathe Sorel (born 1935), painter, sculptor
- Magdaléna Štrompachová (1919–1988), painter, restorer

== T ==
- Margit Tevan (1901–1978), goldsmith

== Z ==
- Eva Zeisel (1906–2011), ceramist, designer
