= 2023 Mt. Everest Deaths =

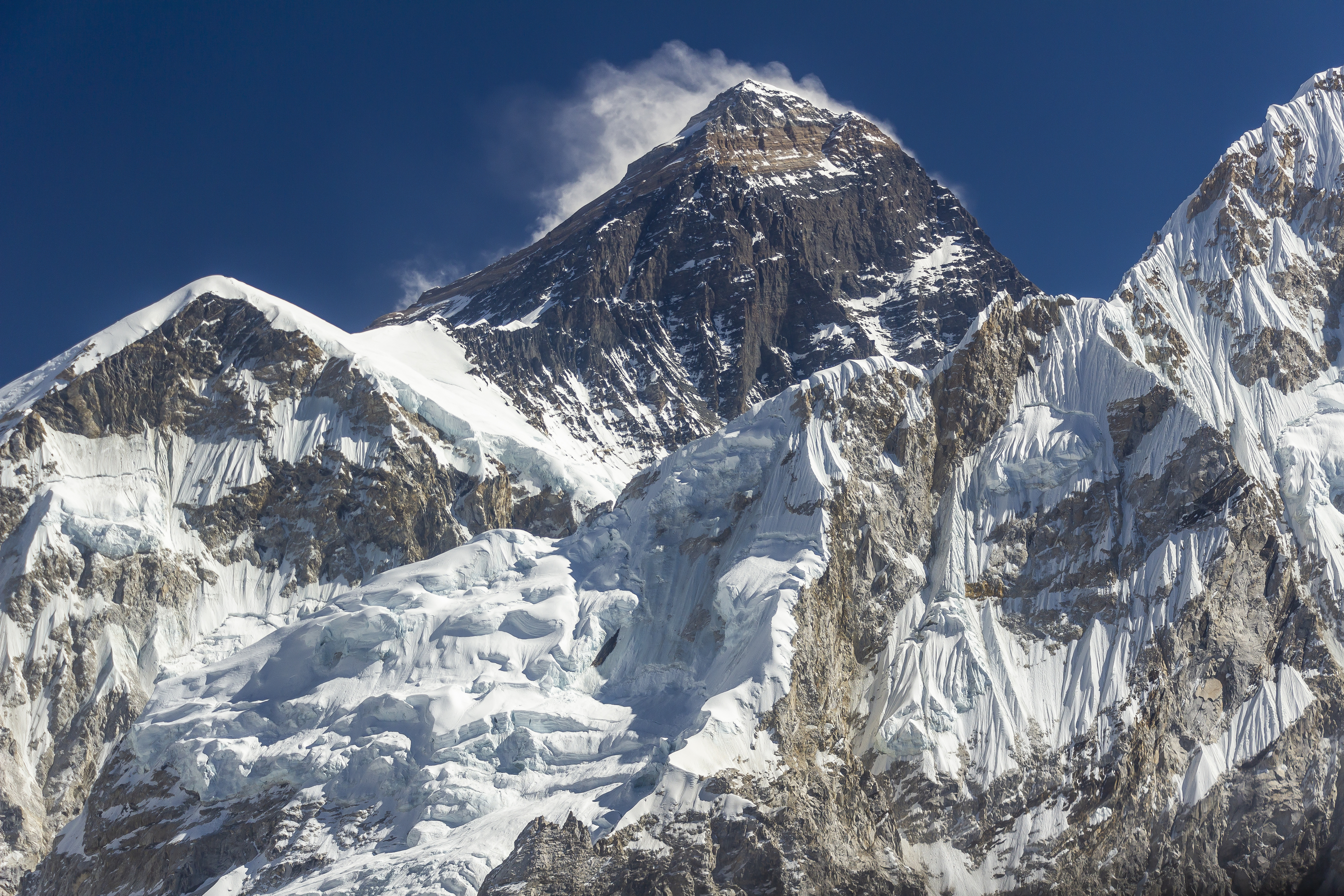
Close-up view of Mount Everest from Kala Patthar in 2023

Throughout 2023, a total of eighteen climbers attempting to summit Mount Everest would be killed, with most of the fatalities being in separate fatal accidents, ranging from falls to high altitude sickness. 2023 would become one of the deadliest years to climb Mount Everest, alongside 1996, 2014, and 2015.

== Background ==
Mount Everest is generally considered the tallest mountain on earth, standing at a peak altitude of 8,848 meters (29,031 feet). Due to its height, it grew in popularity for climbers to summit the mountain. Tragically, multiple deadly mountaineering disasters occurred within the mountain, the deadliest being the 2015 Mt. Everest Avalanche, which killed 22 climbers at base camp.

In 2023, Nepal issued 478 permits for the climbing season, a record high as overcrowding in Mount Everest became one of the main causes for the high fatality count. Main causes for death during the season was due to mainly high altitude sickness, serac falls, and disappearances.

== Notable deaths ==
On April 12, 2023, three Sherpas, Lakpa Rita Sherpa, Pemba Tenzing Sherpa, and Da Chhiree Sherpa, were ferrying climbing gear for their clients, working with the Imagine Nepal team at the Khumbu Icefall, when a large serac piece fell on to the three guides and swept them into a crevasse. The avalanche was reported to have occurred at the southeast ridge route of the mountain early in the morning. None of the bodies would be recovered, also becoming the first fatalities of the season.

On May 18, two climbers died from separate fatal accidents. The first was Suzanne Leopoldina Jesus. A 59-year-old Indian climber who wanted to become the first Asian woman with a pacemaker to climb Everest, however, got ill at base camp. She repeatedly tried to climb from basecamp, although had an extremely difficult time, doing so multiple times. She was "forcibly" airlifted to a hospital, although she later succumbed to her illness. Xuebin Chen, a Chinese climber also died on May 18 while he was ascending up the mountain. As he reached the south summit of the mountain, he attempted to change his eyeglass and throw his oxygen canister from the death zone, before "he fell down".

On May 20, Malaysian climber, Muhammad Hawari Bin Hashim, descended down the mountain after successfully reaching the summit. He lost contact with his group between Camp III and IV, and disappeared. Cause of death remains uncertain, although it was likely accidental.

On May 21, Jason Bernard Kennison would attempt to summit Mount Everest to raise awareness for people with spinal cord injuries, motivated from a car crash he had from his past. Jason managed to reach the summit and was descending, when he started showing abnormal behaviors to his Sherpas, likely suffering from illness, where he later collapsed near the Balcony. His remains were not recovered. The same day, Ang Kami Sherpa, a kitchen staff, died from a fall near Camp II. His remains were later recovered.

On May 25, expert climber, Szilárd Suhajda, who previously had successfully climbed K2, Broad Peak, and Lhotse without supplementary oxygen, would disappear, last seen near the Hillary Step, surrounded by oxygen bottles discarded by other climbers, photographed by a climber. He was reported to have passed out and witnessed by passing climbers who could not help him. Rescue teams were unsuccessful in recovering his body, and he likely died due to HACE. Also on May 25, Ranjit Kumar Shah would disappear, last seen on the south summit.

On May 26, Pieter Swart, an anesthesiologist from Vancouver, would suffer from a fatal respiratory event after descending from Camp IV. He lost consciousness near Camp III and suffered cardiac arrest on his way to Camp II where a helicopter was waiting for him.

The last death of 2023 came from Swapnil Adinath Garad, an Indian Pune cop who suffered through acute mountain sickness near the south summit. He was evacuated and died in a Kathmandu hospital.

== List of deaths ==
Name	Date	Nationality	Cause of death	Location of death	Sources
Lakpa Rita Sherpa	April 12, 2023	🇳🇵Nepal	Swept by a serac fall	Khumbu Icefall	
Pemba Tenzing Sherpa	April 12, 2023	🇳🇵Nepal	Swept by a serac fall	Khumbu Icefall	
Da Chhiree Sherpa	April 12, 2023	🇳🇵Nepal	Swept by a serac fall	Khumbu Icefall	
Jonathan Sugarman	May 1, 2023	🇺🇸United States	Illness	Camp II	
Phurba Sherpa	May 16, 2023	🇳🇵Nepal	Illness	Below Camp IV	
Victor Brinza	May 17, 2023	🇲🇩Moldova	Illness	Camp IV	
Suzanne Leopoldina Jesus	May 18, 2023	🇮🇳India	Illness	Base Camp	
Xuebin Chen	May 18, 2023	🇨🇳China	Fall	South Summit	
Ag Askandar Bin Ampuan Yaacub	May 19, 2023	🇲🇾Malaysia	Illness	South Col	
Shrinivas Sainis Dattatraya	May 19, 2023	🇸🇬Singapore	HACE	8,500m	
Muhammad Hawari Bin Hashim	May 20, 2023	🇲🇾Malaysia	Unknown, disappeared	Between Camp IV and III	
Jason Bernard Kennison	May 21, 2023	🇦🇺Australia	Illness	Balcony	
Ang Kami Sherpa	May 21, 2023	🇳🇵Nepal	Fall	Camp II	
Suhajda Szilárd	May 25, 2023	🇭🇺Hungary	Unknown, likely from HACE	Hillary Step	
Ranjit Kumar Shah	May 25, 2023	🇳🇵Nepal	Disappearance	South Summit	
Pieter Swart	May 26, 2023	🇨🇦Canada	Respiratory event	Descending from Camp VI	
Lhakpa Nuru Sherpa	June 3, 2023	🇳🇵Nepal	HAPE	South Summit	
Swapnil Adinath Garad	June 7, 2023	🇮🇳India	Acute mountain sickness	South Summit	

== See also ==
- List of people who died climbing Mount Everest
- List of deaths on eight-thousanders
- List of mountaineering disasters by death toll
