= Eszter Mattioni =

Hungarian artist (1902–1993)

- Born: 1902; Szekszárd, Austria-Hungary
- Died: 1993 (aged 90–91); Budapest, Hungary
- Known for: Painting

Eszter Mattioni (1902 in Szekszárd – 1993 in Budapest) was a prominent twentieth century Hungarian painter.

== Her life ==
Her father, an Italian silkworm breeding expert who was himself an amateur painter, was hired from Lombardy to Hungary. Her mother, originally from Tolna County, taught in the kindergarten founded by Teréz Brunszvik in Szekszárd. Her grandmother was Erzsike Sass, for whom Petőfi wrote his poem The 'Four-Wheel Chariot'. She was taught by his relatives from the age of 16.

== Her studies, career ==
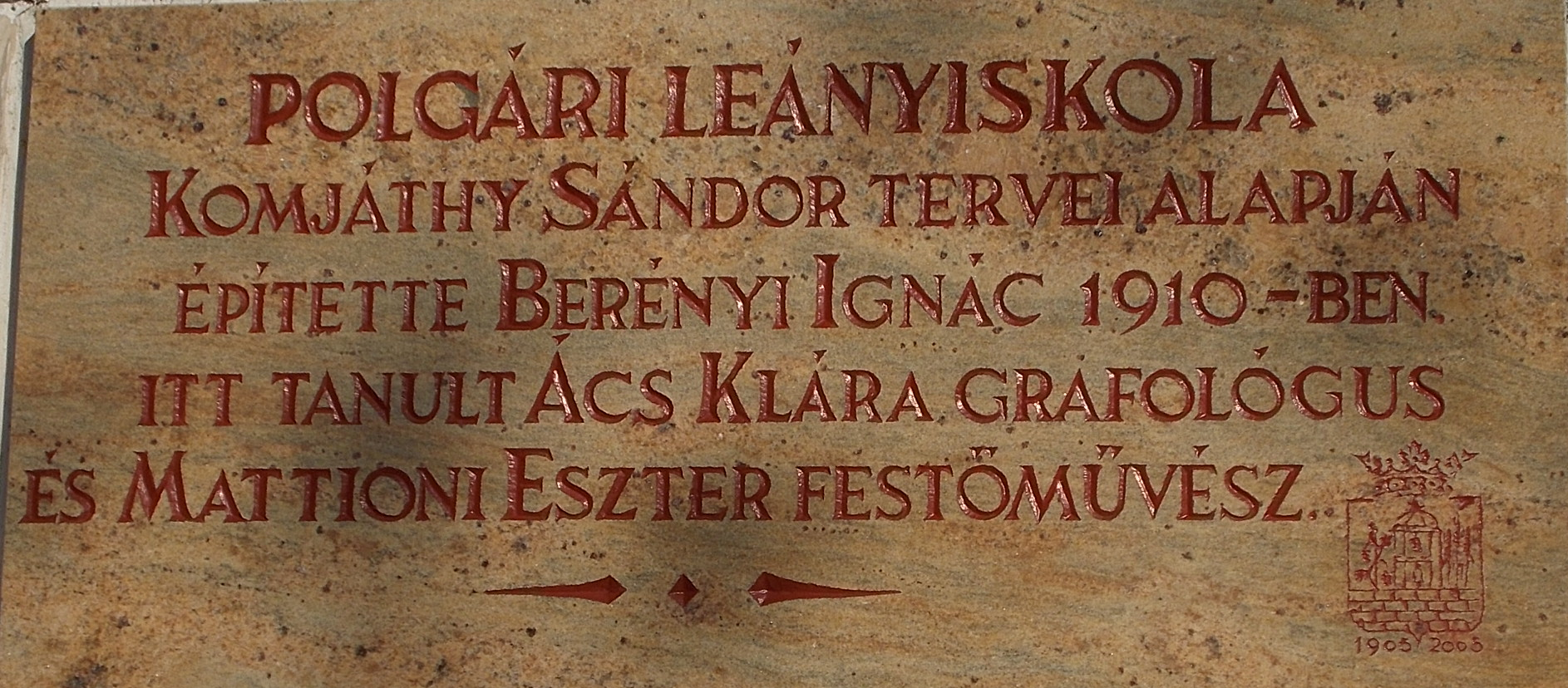
Mattioni plaque

For five years she attended the Applied Arts Vocational School, and between 1931 and 1942 she worked with group of artists known as Zugliget, which included Vilmos Aba-Novák, Károly Patkó, Emil Kelemen, Jenő Barcsay and Ernő Bánk.

She made study trips to Italy in 1935 where she met her future husband and to the Scandinavian countries in 1939 increasing her recognition and acclaim across Europe. In 1940, she was elected Honorary Life Member. In 1946, she became Member of the Pál Szinyei Merse Society which featured the most prominent painters of Hungary.

== External links and sources ==
- Eszter Mattioni at Fine Arts in Hungary
- Galeria origo
