= Békéscsaba =

- City with county rights
- Békéscsaba Megyei Jogú Város
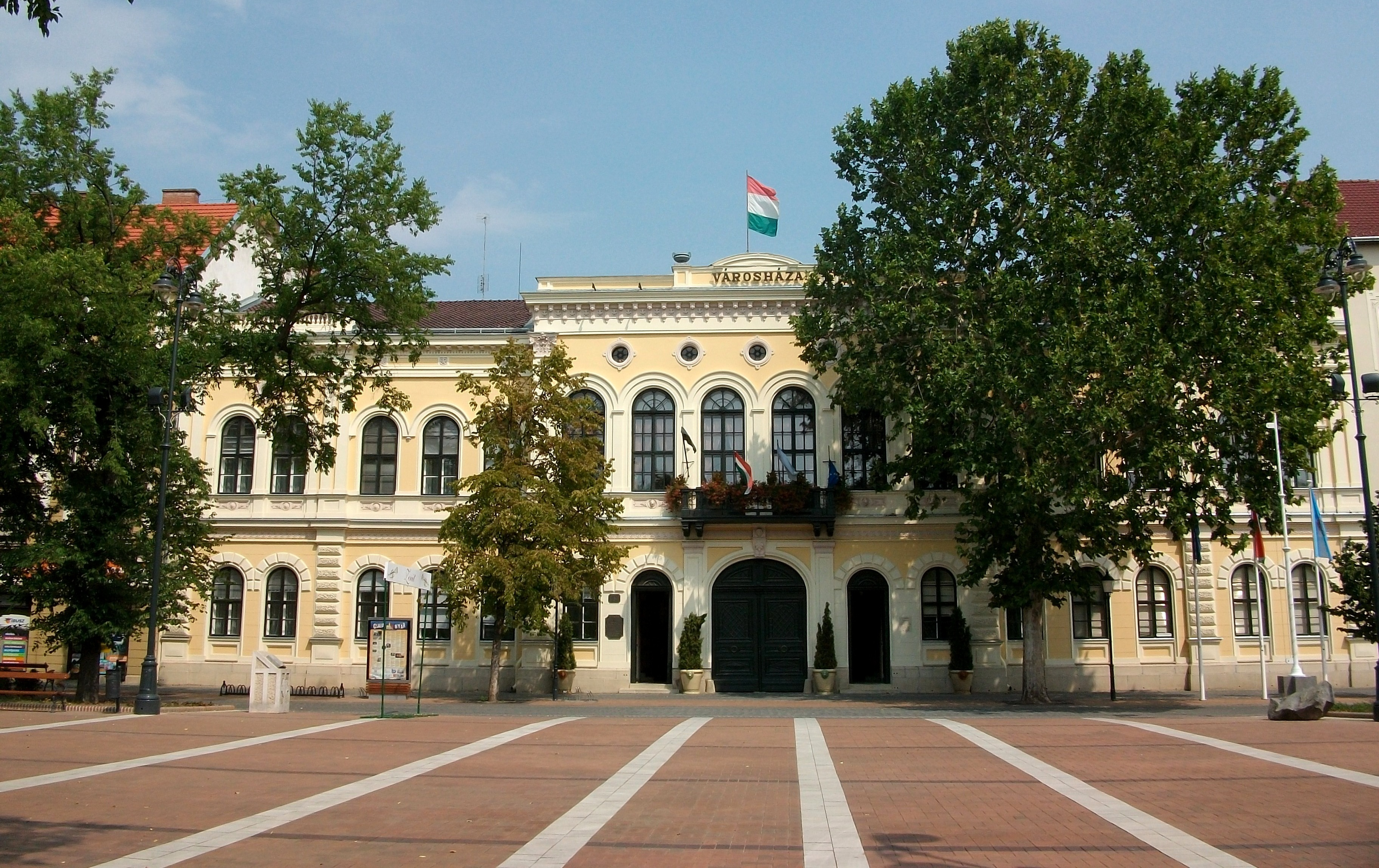
- Békéscsaba city hall

- Flag Coat of arms

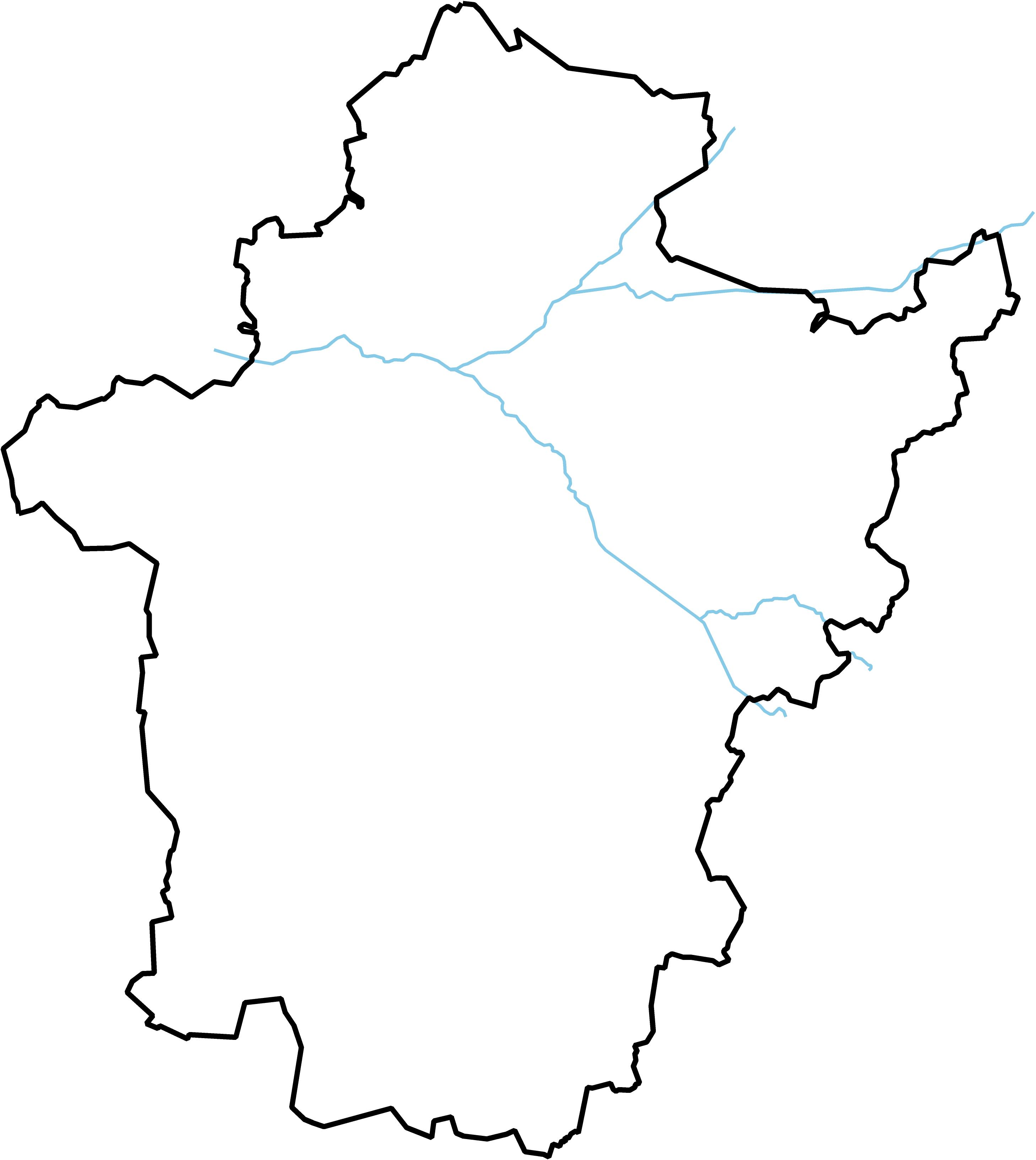
- Location within Békés County Location within Hungary Location within Europe
- Coordinates: 46.679°N 21.091°E
- Country: Hungary
- County: Békés
- District: Békéscsaba

Government
  - Mayor: Péter Szarvas (Independent)

Area
  - Total: 193.93 km^{2} (74.88 sq mi)
- Elevation: 89 m (292 ft)

Population (2017)
  - Total: 59,732
  - Rank: 16th
  - Density: 308.01/km^{2} (797.74/sq mi)
- Time zone: UTC+1 (CET)
  - Summer (DST): UTC+2 (CEST)
- Postal code: 5600, 5623, 5671
- Area code: (+36) 66
- Website: bekescsaba.hu

Békéscsaba (Hungarian pronunciation: [ˈbeːkeːʃt͡ʃɒbɒ]; Slovak: Békešská Čaba; see also other alternative names) is a city with county rights in southeast Hungary, the capital of Békés County.

== Geography ==
Békéscsaba is located in the Great Hungarian Plain, 215 km (134 mi) southeast from Budapest. Highway 44, 47, Békéscsaba beltway (around the city) and Budapest-Szolnok-Békéscsaba-Lőkösháza high speed (120–160 km/h (75–99 mph)) railway line also cross the city. Highway 44 is a four-lane expressway between Békéscsaba and Gyula. According to the 2011 census, the city has a total area of 193.93 km^{2} (75 sq mi).

== Name ==
Csaba is a popular Hungarian given name for boys of Turkic origin, while the prefix Békés refers to the county named Békés, which means peaceful in Hungarian. Other names derived from the Hungarian one include German: Tschabe, Romanian: Bichișciaba, and Slovak: Békešská Čaba.

== History ==
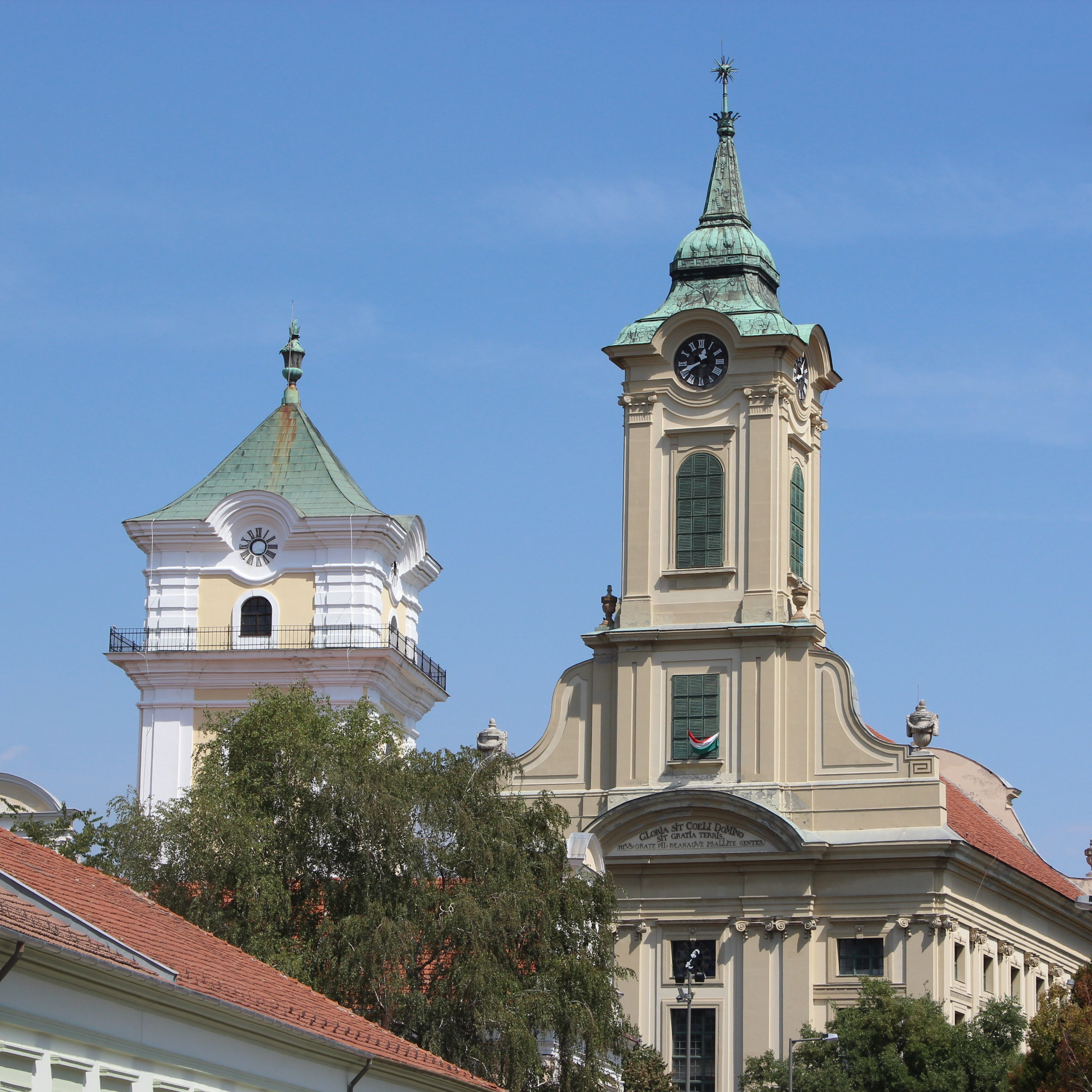
Small and Great Lutheran churches

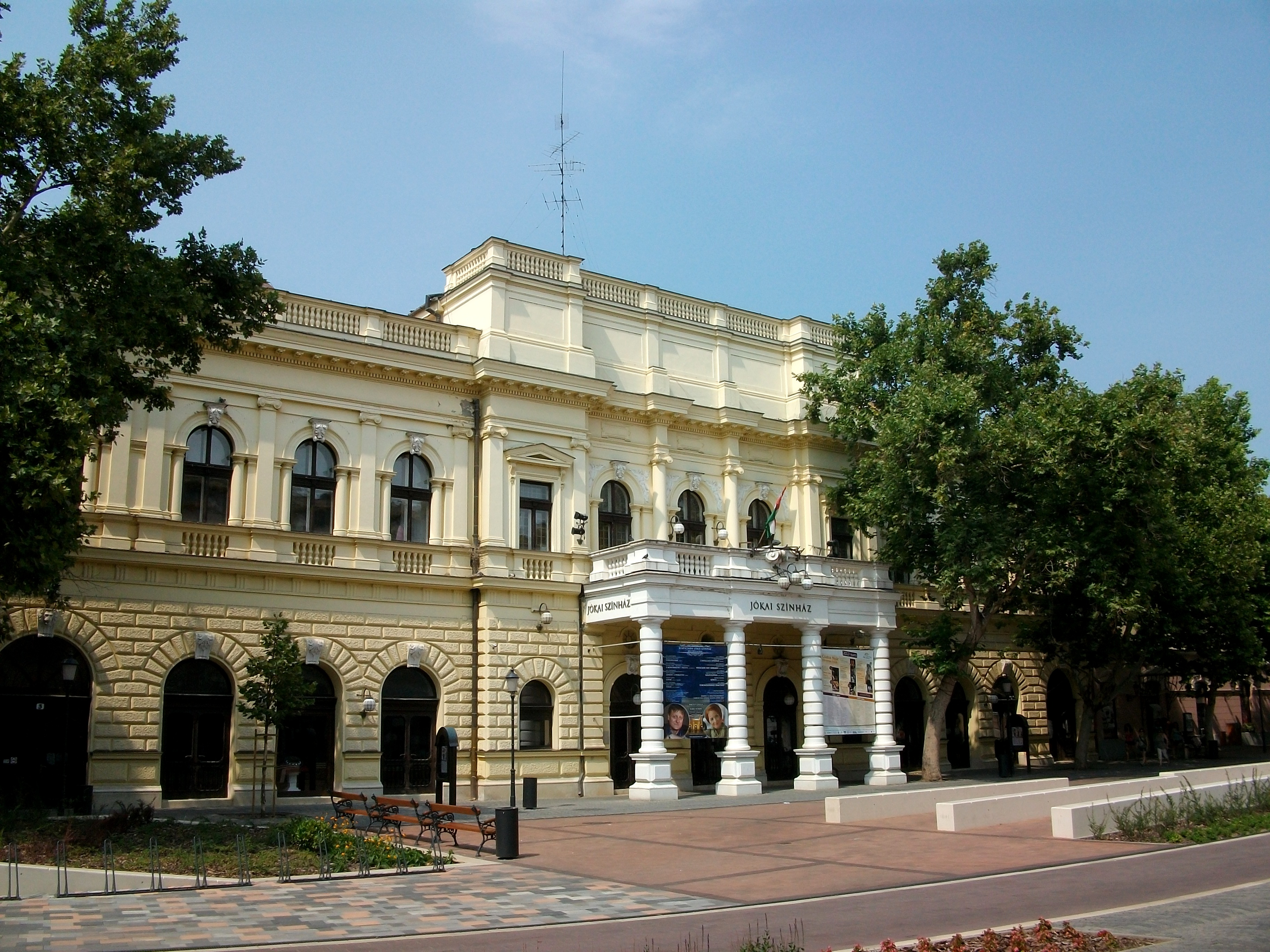
Mór Jókai Theatre

The area has been inhabited since the ancient times. In the Iron Age the area had been conquered by the Scythians, by the Celts, then by the Huns. After the Hungarian Conquest, there were many small villages in the area.

The medieval Hungarian village of Csaba was established in the 13th century, first mentioned in the 1330s. Besides Csaba, eight other villages stood where now the town stands. According to the Hungarian Royal Treasury, Békéscsaba was an ethnic Hungarian settlement in 1495. When the Turks conquered the southern and central parts of Hungary, and these territories became part of the Ottoman Empire, the town survived, but it became extinct during the fights against the Turks in the 17th century.

In 1715, Csaba is mentioned as a deserted place, but only one year later its name can be found in a document mentioning the tax-paying towns. It is likely that the new Csaba was founded by János György Harruckern, who earned distinction in the liberation fights against the Ottoman Empire and bought the area of Békés county. In 1718, Harruckern invited Slovak settlers from Upper Hungary to the deserted area. By 1847, the town was among the twenty largest towns of Hungary, with a population of 22,000. Nevertheless, Csaba was still like a large village, with muddy streets and crowded houses.

By 1858, the railway line reached the town. This brought development; new houses and factories were built, and the town began to prosper. Still, by the end of the 19th century the unemployment caused increasing tension, and in 1891 a revolt was suppressed by the help of Romanian soldiers. One of the most important people in the politics of the town was András L. Áchim, who founded a peasants' party, and succeeded in elevating Békéscsaba to the rank of "city with council".

World War I brought suffering to the town. Between 1919 and 1920, Békéscsaba was under Romanian occupation. After the Treaty of Trianon, Hungary lost its most important southern cities, Arad and Nagyvárad (Oradea, both of them today in Romania), and Békéscsaba had to take over their roles, becoming the most important town of the region. Hungarians overtook Slovaks in the 1920s, become the majority ethnic group according to the census held in 1930.

Between the two world wars, a flood in 1925 and the collapse of the global economy four years later, increased poverty and unemployment.

Battles were not fought in the area during World War II. However, several events occurred in the town in 1944: between 24 and 26 June 1944, over 3,000 Jews were sent to Auschwitz.

On 21 September 1944, the British and American Air Force bombed the railway station and its surroundings, killing more than 100 people. On 6 October 1944, the Soviet army occupied Békéscsaba.

During the Socialist times, Békéscsaba became the county seat of Békés (1950) and began to develop into one of the most important centres of food industry of Hungary. After the fall of the Communism in 1989, the industry nearly collapsed and many people lost their jobs. However, today the crisis seems to be over and Békéscsaba remained one of the most important centers of the Hungarian food industry.

== Demographics ==
Historical population of Békéscsaba
Year	Population	Hungarians	Slovaks
1880	32,616	6,250 (19.2%)	24,073 (73.8%)
1890	34,243	7,728 (22.6%)	25,917 (75.7%)
1900	37,547	9,501 (25.3%)	27,488 (73.2%)
1910	42,599	13,271 (31.2%)	28,682 (67.3%)
1920	46,633	21,407 (45.9%)	24,710 (53%)
1930	49,374	30,054 (60.9%)	18,931 (38.4%)
1941	52,404	35,258 (67.3%)	16,781 (32%)
1949	45,892	44,328 (96.6%)	1,254 (2.7%)
1960	50,212	47,840 (95.3%)	2,170 (4.3%)
1980	67,225	66,388 (98.8%)	679 (1%)
2001	67,968	63,782 (93.8%)	4,078 (6%)
2011	62,050	51,842 (83.5%)	1,881 (3%)
Source: Note:

=== Languages ===
According to the 2011 census the total population of Békéscsaba were 62,050, of whom 61,912 people (99.8%) speak Hungarian, 10,140 (16.3%) English, 4,821 (7.8%) German and 3,399 (5.5%) speak Slovak.

=== Ethnic groups ===
According to the 2011 census there were 51,842 (83.5%) Hungarians, 1,881 (3%) Slovaks, 402 (0.6%) Roma, 293 (0.5%) Romanians and 170 (0.3%) Germans in Békéscsaba. 9,666 people (15.6%) did not declare their ethnicity. In Hungary, people can declare more than one ethnicity, so other people declared Hungarian and a minority one together.

=== Religion ===
According to the 1869 census (first modern census in Hungary) Békéscsaba had 30,022 inhabitants, of whom there were 21,988 (73.2%) Lutheran, 5,880 (19.6%) Roman Catholic, 1,043 (3.5%) Jewish, 520 (1.7%) Orthodox and 436 (1.4%) Hungarian Reformed (Calvinist).

The 1949 census showed 45,892 people, 25,661 (56.2%) Lutheran, 14,216 (31.1%) Roman Catholic, 4,750 (10.4%) Hungarian Reformed and 498 (1.1%) Jewish.

In 2011 there were 10,694 (17.2%) Roman Catholic, 8,012 (12.9%) Lutheran and 4,408 (7.1%) Hungarian Reformed in Békéscsaba. 19,650 people (31.7%) were irreligious and 1,027 (1.7%) Atheist, while 16,883 people (27.2%) did not declare their religion.

== Tourist sights ==
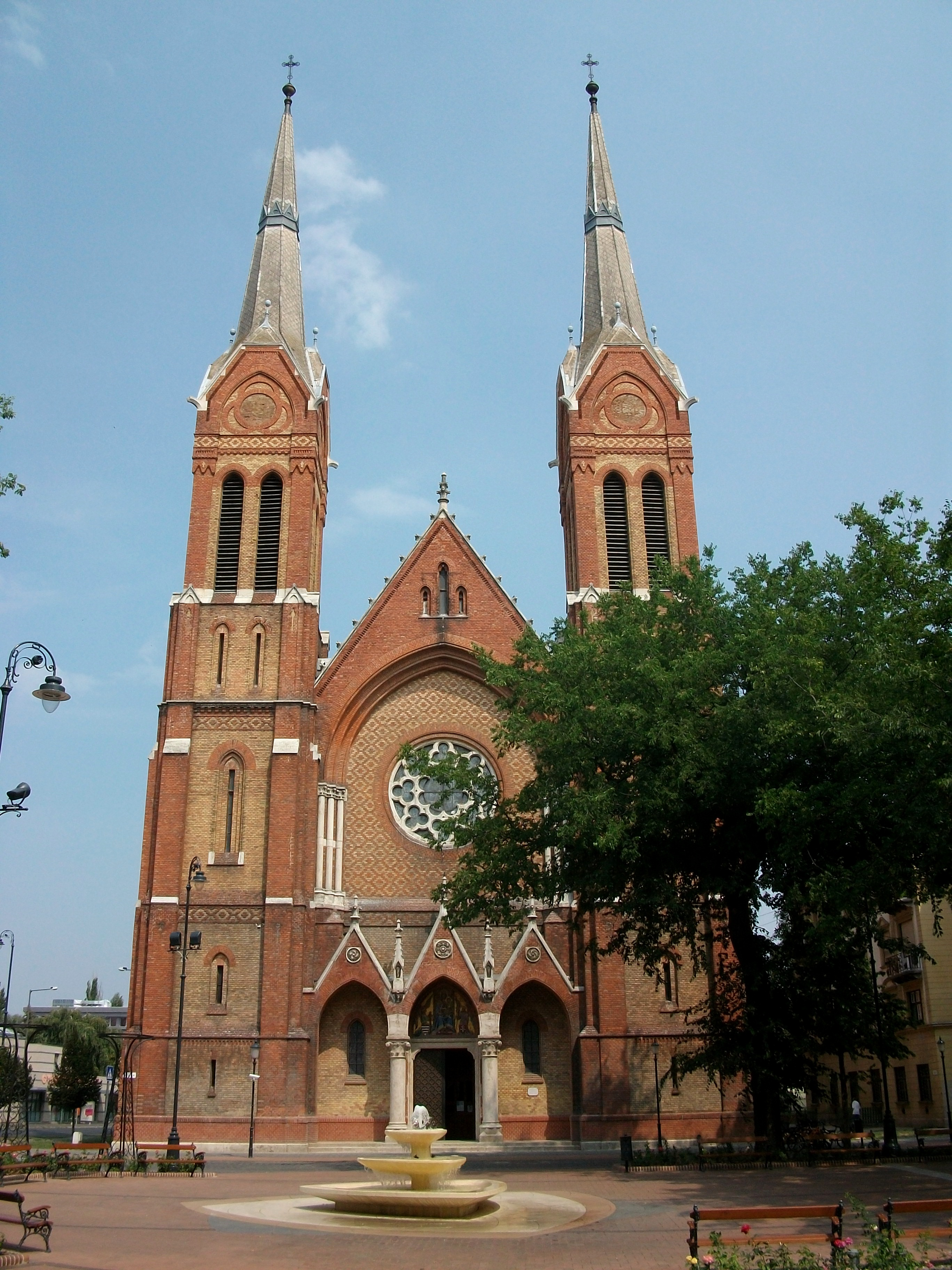
Saint Anthony of Padua Cathedral

- Great Lutheran Church (Evangélikus Nagytemplom)
- Small Lutheran Church (Evangélikus Kistemplom)
- Saint Anthony of Padua Cathedral (Páduai Szent Antal székesegyház)
- City hall (designed by Miklós Ybl, 1873) (Városháza)
- Mihály Munkácsy Museum (Munkácsy Mihály Múzeum)
- Mihály Munkácsy Memorial House (Munkácsy Mihály Emlékház)
- Mór Jókai Theatre (Jókai Színház)
- Slovak County House (Szlovák Tájház)

== Politics ==
The current mayor of Békéscsaba is Péter Szarvas (Hajrá Békéscsaba).

The local Municipal Assembly, elected at the 2019 local government elections, is made up of 18 members (1 Mayor, 12 Individual constituencies MEPs and 5 Compensation List MEPs) divided into this political parties and alliances:

Party	Seats	Current Municipal Assembly
Hajrá Békéscsaba	8	M
Fidesz-KDNP	7	
MSZP-LMP	2	
DK-Jobbik-Dialogue	1	

=== List of mayors ===
List of City Mayors from 1990:

Member	Party	Term of office
János Pap	SZDSZ	1990–2006
Gyula Vantara	Fidesz-KDNP	2006–2014
Péter Szarvas	Independent (Hajrá Békéscsaba)	2014–

== Climate ==
Békéscsaba has a humid continental climate (Köppen Dfa) closely bordering on a humid subtropical climate (Köppen Cfa). Among them, the annual average temperature is 11.2 °C (52.2 °F), the hottest month in July is 22.1 °C (71.8 °F), and the coldest month is −0.5 °C (31.1 °F) in January. The annual precipitation is 574.3 millimetres (22.61 in), of which June is the wettest with 68.0 millimetres (2.68 in), while January is the driest with only 32.2 millimetres (1.27 in). The extreme temperature throughout the year ranged from −24.6 °C (−12.3 °F) on 25 December 2001 to 41.7 °C (107.1 °F) on 21 August 2000.

Climate data for Békéscsaba, 1991–2020
Month	Jan	Feb	Mar	Apr	May	Jun	Jul	Aug	Sep	Oct	Nov	Dec	Year
Record high °C (°F)	17.2 (63.0)	20.5 (68.9)	25.1 (77.2)	30.6 (87.1)	33.1 (91.6)	38.1 (100.6)	39.4 (102.9)	41.7 (107.1)	36.4 (97.5)	29.1 (84.4)	24.5 (76.1)	17.4 (63.3)	41.7 (107.1)
Mean daily maximum °C (°F)	2.9 (37.2)	5.7 (42.3)	11.6 (52.9)	17.9 (64.2)	23.1 (73.6)	26.7 (80.1)	28.8 (83.8)	29.0 (84.2)	23.3 (73.9)	17.4 (63.3)	10.4 (50.7)	3.8 (38.8)	16.7 (62.1)
Daily mean °C (°F)	−0.5 (31.1)	1.3 (34.3)	6.1 (43.0)	11.8 (53.2)	16.7 (62.1)	20.4 (68.7)	22.1 (71.8)	22.0 (71.6)	16.8 (62.2)	11.3 (52.3)	5.9 (42.6)	0.8 (33.4)	11.2 (52.2)
Mean daily minimum °C (°F)	−3.5 (25.7)	−2.6 (27.3)	0.9 (33.6)	5.6 (42.1)	10.3 (50.5)	14.0 (57.2)	15.6 (60.1)	15.3 (59.5)	10.9 (51.6)	6.1 (43.0)	2.0 (35.6)	−2.1 (28.2)	6.0 (42.8)
Record low °C (°F)	−23.4 (−10.1)	−24.0 (−11.2)	−17.3 (0.9)	−6.9 (19.6)	−1.7 (28.9)	4.4 (39.9)	5.7 (42.3)	6.4 (43.5)	0.6 (33.1)	−9.4 (15.1)	−9.8 (14.4)	−24.6 (−12.3)	−24.6 (−12.3)
Average precipitation mm (inches)	32.2 (1.27)	35.0 (1.38)	33.0 (1.30)	43.4 (1.71)	59.2 (2.33)	68.0 (2.68)	64.8 (2.55)	53.8 (2.12)	49.6 (1.95)	44.9 (1.77)	44.0 (1.73)	46.4 (1.83)	574.3 (22.61)
Average precipitation days (≥ 1.0 mm)	6.7	7.1	6.0	7.5	7.7	8.6	7.6	5.5	6.6	6.3	7.1	8.0	84.7
Average relative humidity (%)	87.3	81.2	70.1	66.0	67.1	69.0	68.1	67.6	71.8	78.5	84.2	88.6	75.0
Source: NOAA

== Notable people ==
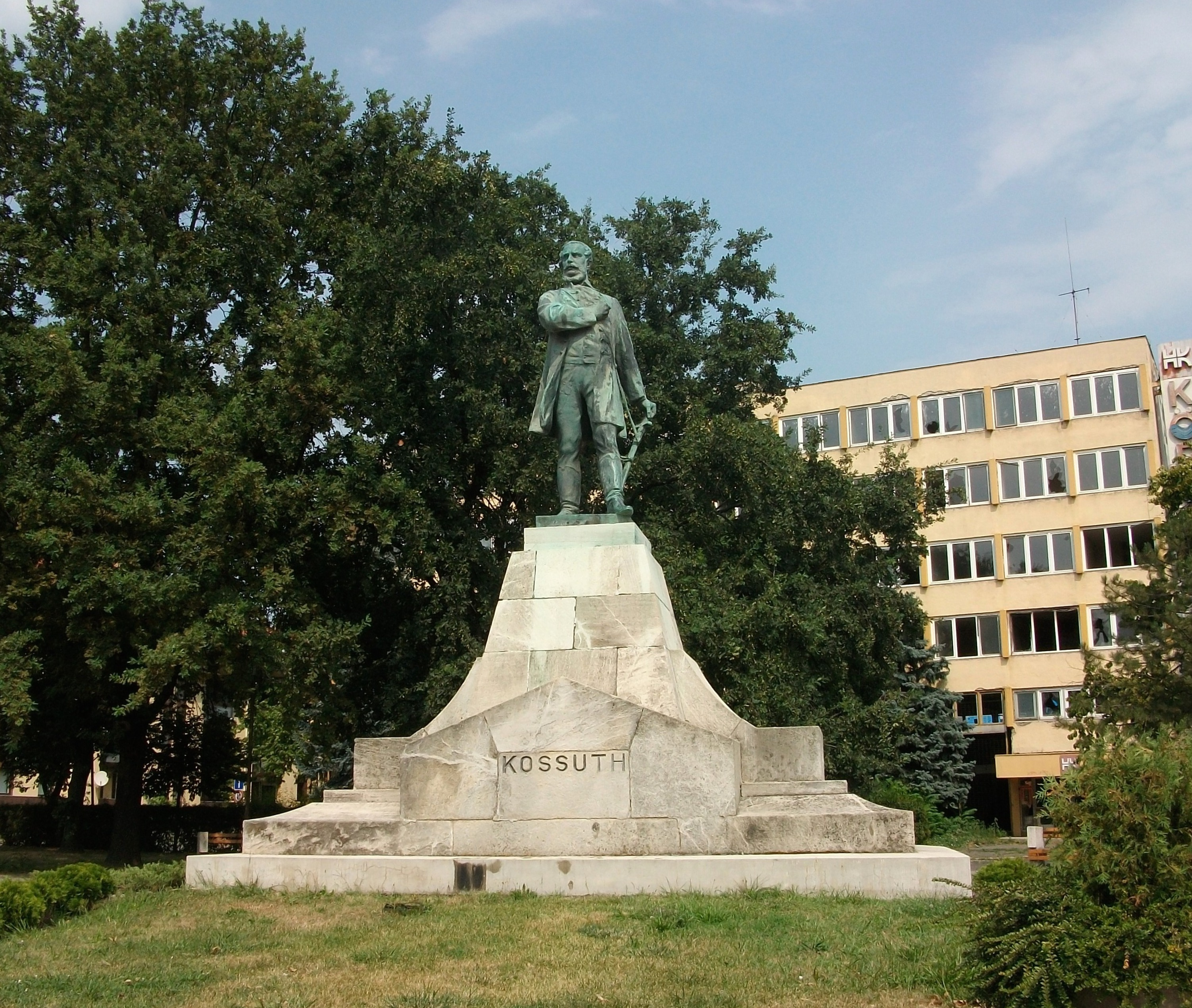
Kossuth statue

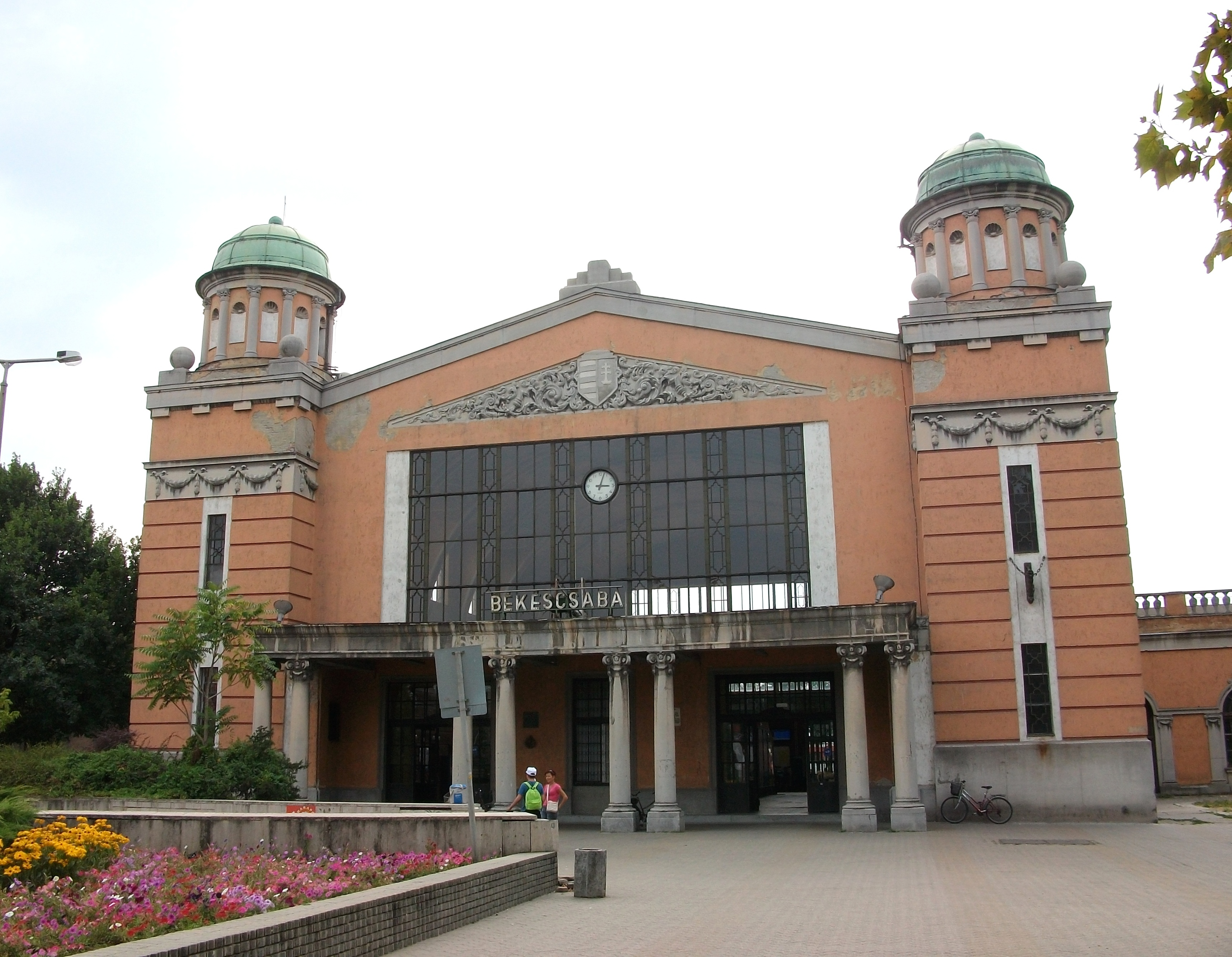
Békéscsaba railway station

=== Born in Békéscsaba ===
- András L. Áchim (1871–1911), Hungarian politician
- Ján Valašťan Dolinský (1892–1965), Slovak composer
- Péter Gaszner (1939) Hungarian psychiatrist
- Dániel Gyollai (1997), Footballer
- Gyula Hegyi (1951), politician
- Károly Klimó (1936), artist
- Gábor Laurenczy (1954), Hungarian chemist and academic
- Enikő Mihalik (1987), supermodel
- Henrietta Ónodi (1974), gymnast
- Béla Szabados (1974), swimmer
- Ádám Szepesi (1945), high jumper
- Margit Tevan (1901–1978), goldsmith
- Veronica van Heyningen (b. 1946), geneticist
- László Vidovszky (1944), composer and pianist
- Suhajda Szilárd (1982-2023), Mountain climber (solo)

=== Lived in Békéscsaba ===
- Endre Bajcsy-Zsilinszky (1886–1944), Hungarian politician
- Mihály Munkácsy (1844–1900), Hungarian painter
- Péter Kelemen World Champion Modern pentathlete

=== Died in Békéscsaba ===
- Sándor Erkel (1900), composer, son of Ferenc Erkel

== Sport ==
Békéscsaba has had two major association football clubs. Among them the most famous is Békéscsaba 1912 Előre playing even in the top tier, Nemzeti Bajnokság I. The other major association football club is Jamina SE, also known as Békéscsaba TASK.

== Twin towns – sister cities ==
Békéscsaba is twinned with:

- Beiuș, Romania
- Krompachy, Slovakia
- Martin, Slovakia
- Mikkeli, Finland
- Odorheiu Secuiesc, Romania
- Tarnowskie Góry, Poland
- Trenčín, Slovakia
- Uzhhorod, Ukraine
- Wittenberg, Germany
- Zrenjanin, Serbia
