= Károly Patkó =

Hungarian painter and copper engraver

Karoly Patko (1895 - 1941 in Budapest) was a twentieth century Hungarian painter and copper engraver, noted for his nude paintings in a plastic presentation.

Patkó, studied in Budapest, was influenced by István Szőnyi and Vilmos Aba Novák who he worked with in the 1920s and 1930s. He visited Italy in 1923 influenced by art in Rome.

He produced many paintings throughout the 1930s and was a close friend of Erno Bank who painted his portrait on numerous occasions most notably the 1928 painting of him in the mirror. He died in 1941 only aged 46.

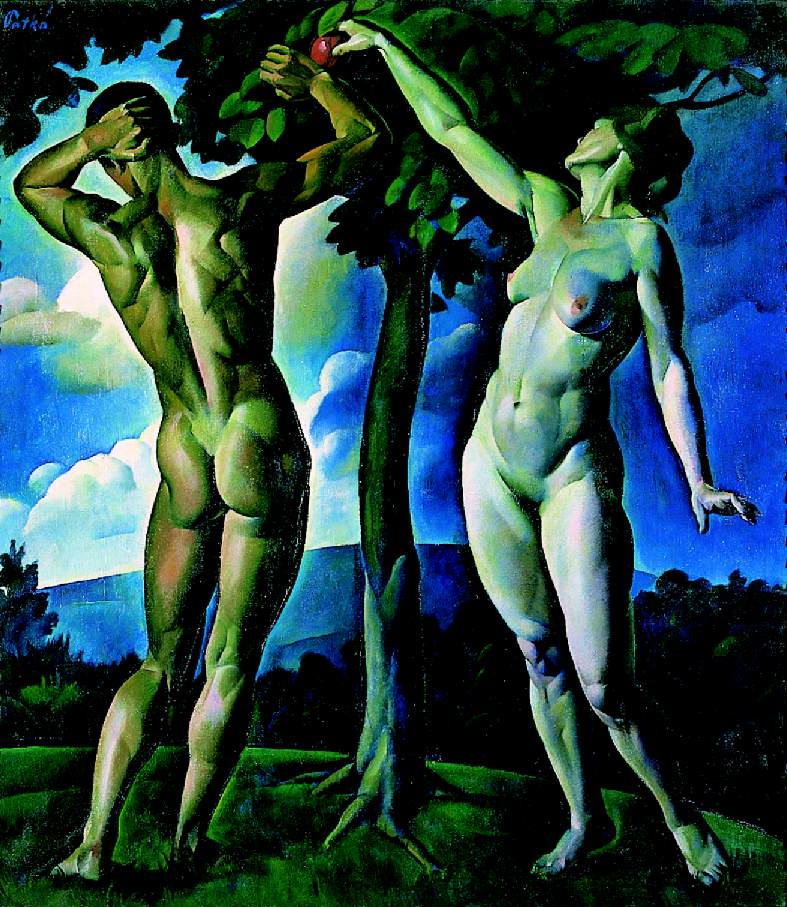
Adam and Eve, 1920

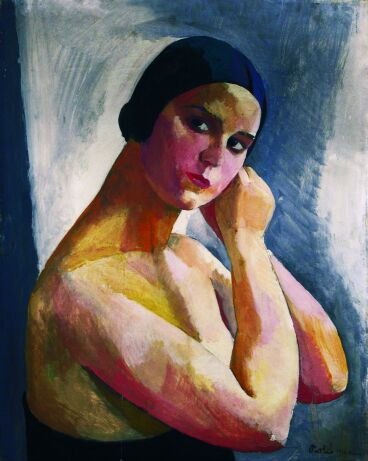
In Front of a Mirror, 1930

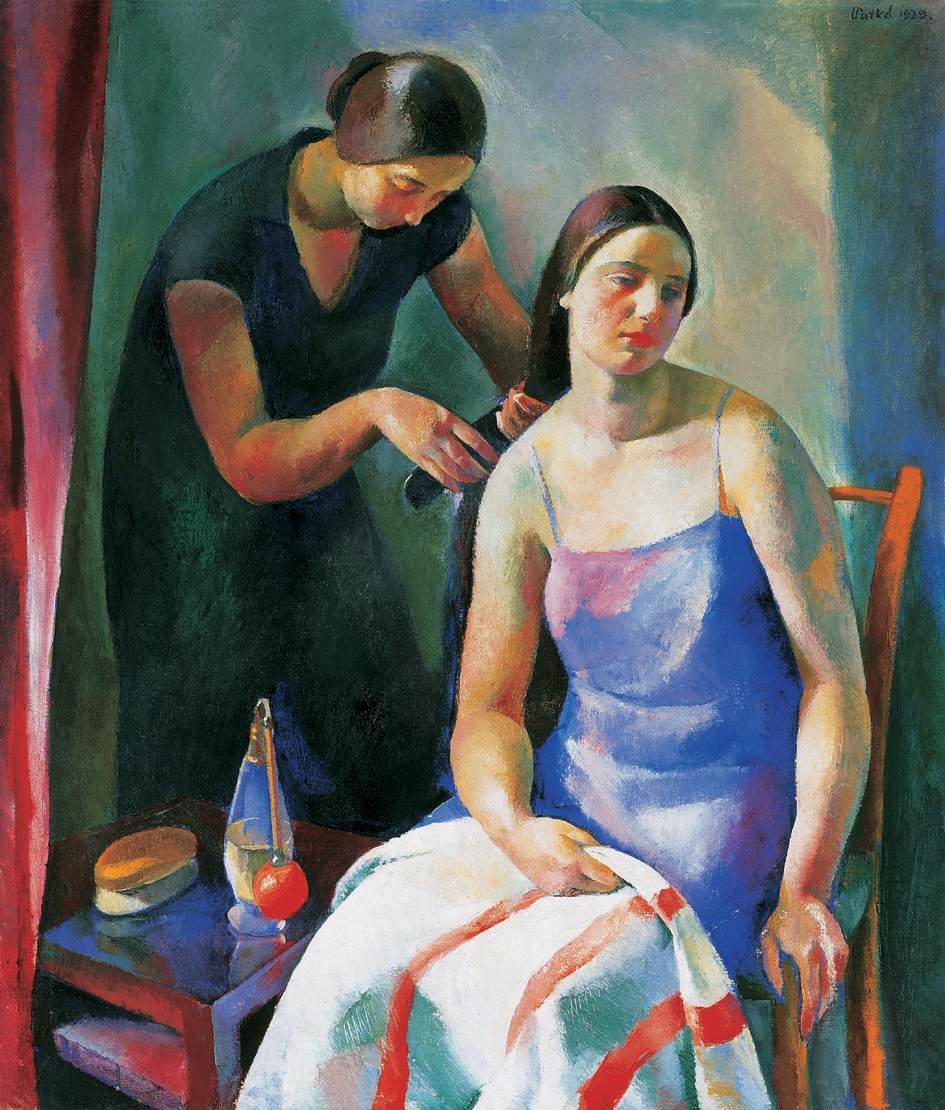
Before the Bath, 1929

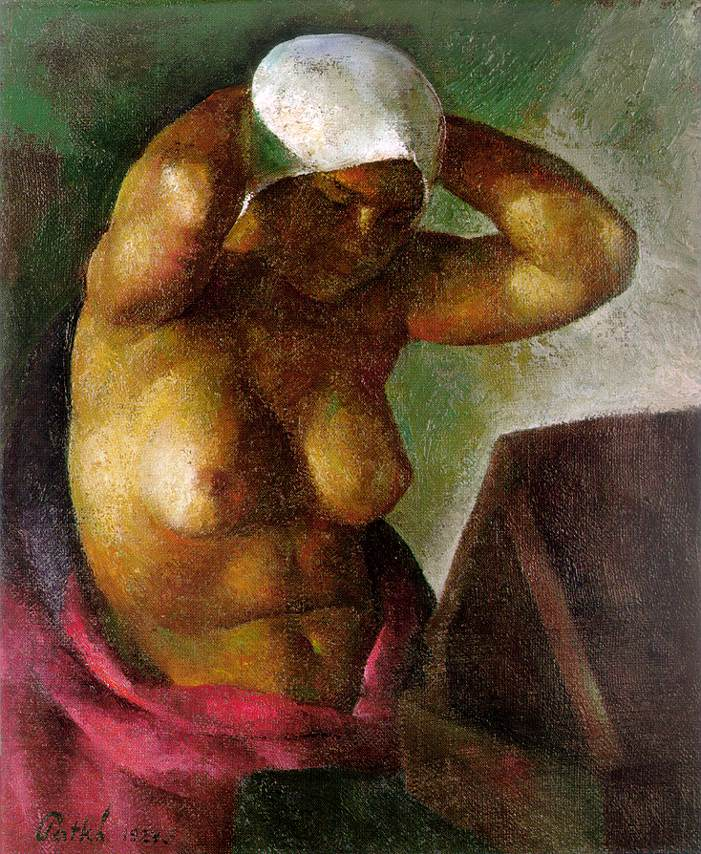
After the Bath, 1924

== External links and sources ==
- Fine Arts in Hungary
