= Bušince =

Village and municipality in Slovakia

Bušince Bussa
- Municipality
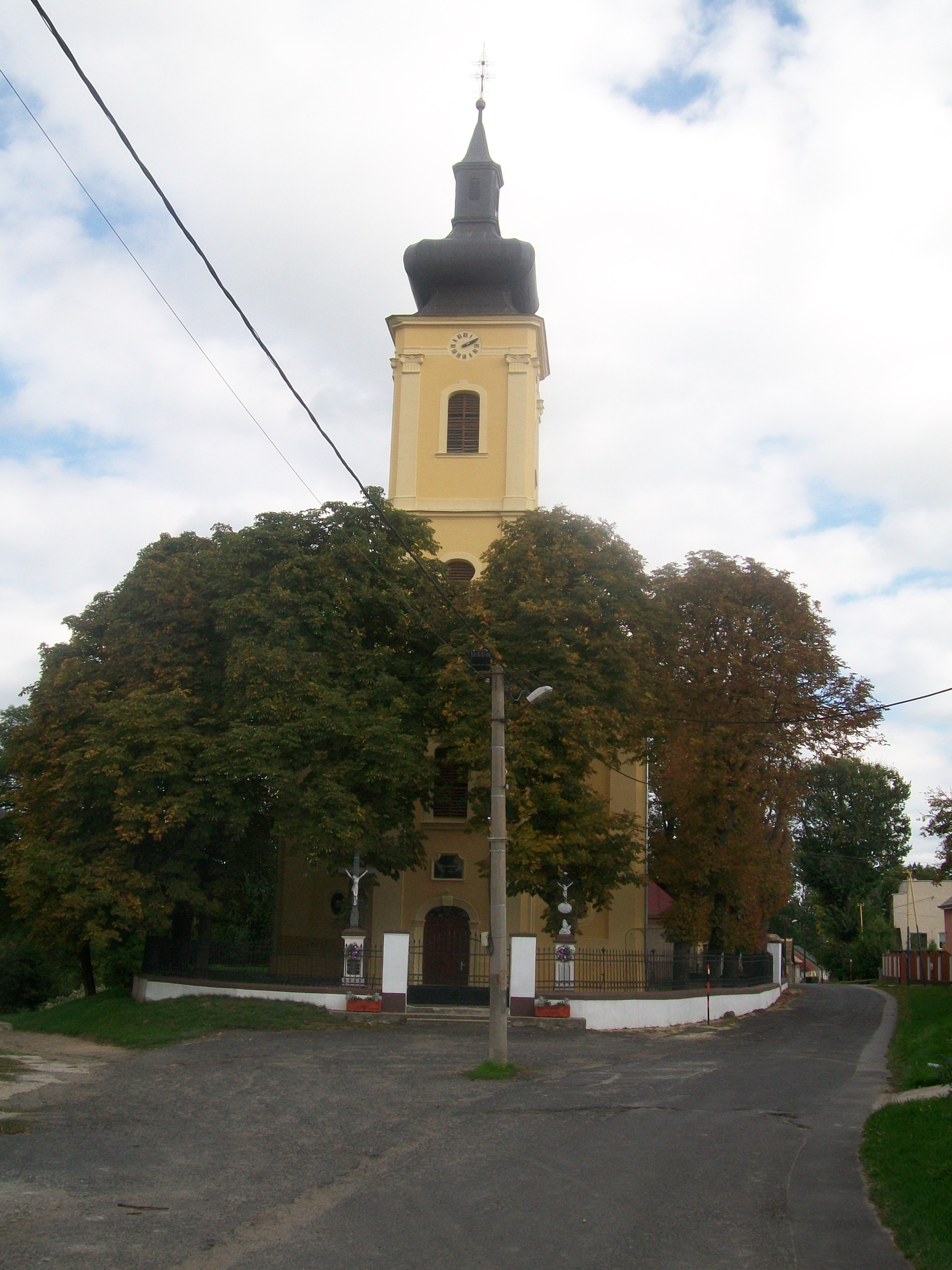
- Roman Catholic church of St. Demetrius martyr

- Flag

- Location of Bušince in the Banská Bystrica Region Location of Bušince in Slovakia
- Coordinates: 48.17°N 19.50°E
- Country: Slovakia
- Region: Banská Bystrica Region
- District: Veľký Krtíš District
- First mentioned: 1248

Area
  - Total: 12.53 km^{2} (4.84 sq mi)
- Elevation: 162 m (531 ft)

Population (2025)
  - Total: 1,344
- Time zone: UTC+1 (CET)
  - Summer (DST): UTC+2 (CEST)
- Postal code: 991 22
- Area code: +421 47
- Vehicle registration plate (until 2022): VK
- Website: www.obecbusince.sk

Bušince (German: Buschin; Hungarian: Bussa) is a village and municipality in the Veľký Krtíš District of the Banská Bystrica Region of southern Slovakia.

== Geography ==
The municipality lies at an altitude of 162 metres (531 ft) and covers an area of 12.53 km^{2} (4.84 sq mi) (2025).

== History ==
The village was first mentioned in 1248 (Bussa). It belonged to Divín, and after until the 17th century to Modrý Kameň. It suffered war devastations very much. It was defended by the great condottiere Tercsi, but in 1595 was occupied by Turks. From 1938 to 1944 it belonged to Hungary.

== Population ==
Population statistic (10 years)
Year	1995	2005	2015	2025
Count	1339	1438	1450	1344
Difference		+7.39%	+0.83%	−7.31%

Population statistic
Year	2024	2025
Count	1365	1344
Difference		−1.53%

It has a population of 1344 people (31 December 2025).

=== Ethnicity ===
Census 2021 (1+ %)
Ethnicity	Number	Fraction
Slovak	1065	75.85%
Hungarian	337	24%
Not found out	74	5.27%
Romani	19	1.35%
Total	1404	

In year 2021 was 1404 people by ethnicity 1065 as Slovak, 337 as Hungarian, 74 as Not found out, 19 as Romani, 12 as Czech, 2 as Rusyn, 1 as Italian and 1 as Other.

Note on population: The difference values of population numbers in the table "Population statistic" and in the sections "Ethnicity" & "Religion" is caused by the use of various statistical methods.

=== Religion ===
Census 2021 (1+ %)
Religion	Number	Fraction
Roman Catholic Church	1122	79.91%
None	145	10.33%
Not found out	64	4.56%
Evangelical Church	39	2.78%
Total	1404	

In year 2021 was 1404 people by religion 1122 from Roman Catholic Church, 145 from None, 64 from Not found out, 39 from Evangelical Church, 13 from Greek Catholic Church, 5 from Christian Congregations in Slovakia, 4 from Calvinist Church, 2 from Old Catholic Church, 2 from Eastern Orthodox Church, 2 from Other and not ascertained christian church, 2 from Baptists Church, 1 from Islam, 1 from United Methodist Church, 1 from Buddhism and 1 from Ad hoc movements.

== Twin towns — sister cities ==
Bušince is twinned with:

- Szalmatercs, Hungary

== See also ==
- List of municipalities and towns in Slovakia

== Genealogical resources ==
The records for genealogical research are available at the state archive "Státný archiv in Banská Bystrica, Slovakia"

- Roman Catholic church records (births/marriages/deaths): 1787-1945 (parish A)
- Lutheran church records (births/marriages/deaths): 1745-1931 (parish B)
