= Péter Gaszner =

Hungarian psychiatrist

- Born: Péter Gaszner; 4 August 1939; Békéscsaba, Hungary
- Died: 25 July 2017 (aged 77); Budapest
- Citizenship: Hungarian
- Education: Újdiósgyőr High School, Medical University of Debrecen
- Known for: Family therapy, Psychiatry
- Spouse(s): Andrea Ludány (1964-1978); Mária Saál (1978-1983); Mária Katona (1983-2007)
- Scientific career
- Fields: Sleep disorder Panic disorder Psychiatry; Psychology; Psychotherapy; Schizophrenia; Family therapy Sleep disorder
- Workplaces: Neurology and Mental Clinic of the Medical University of Pécs (1963-1978); National Institute of Psychiatry and Neurology (1978-2007)

Péter Gaszner (4 August 1939 – 25 July 2017) was a Hungarian psychiatrist, chief physician of the National Institute of Psychiatry and Neurology in Hungary, and professor of the Semmelweis University in Budapest.

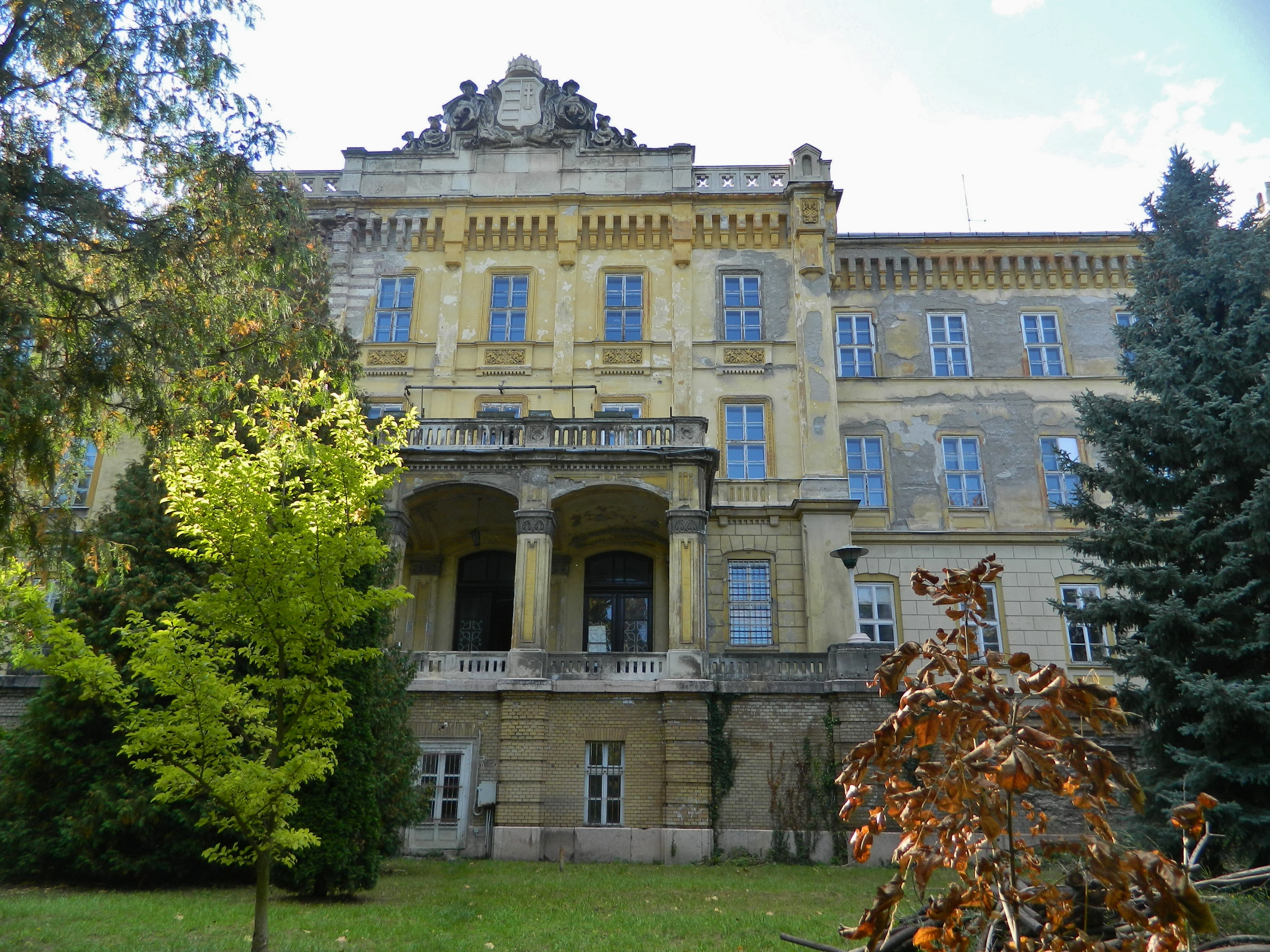
National Institute of Psychiatry and Neurology (1953–2007) The building in 2013. Péter Gaszner worked here between 1978 and 2007

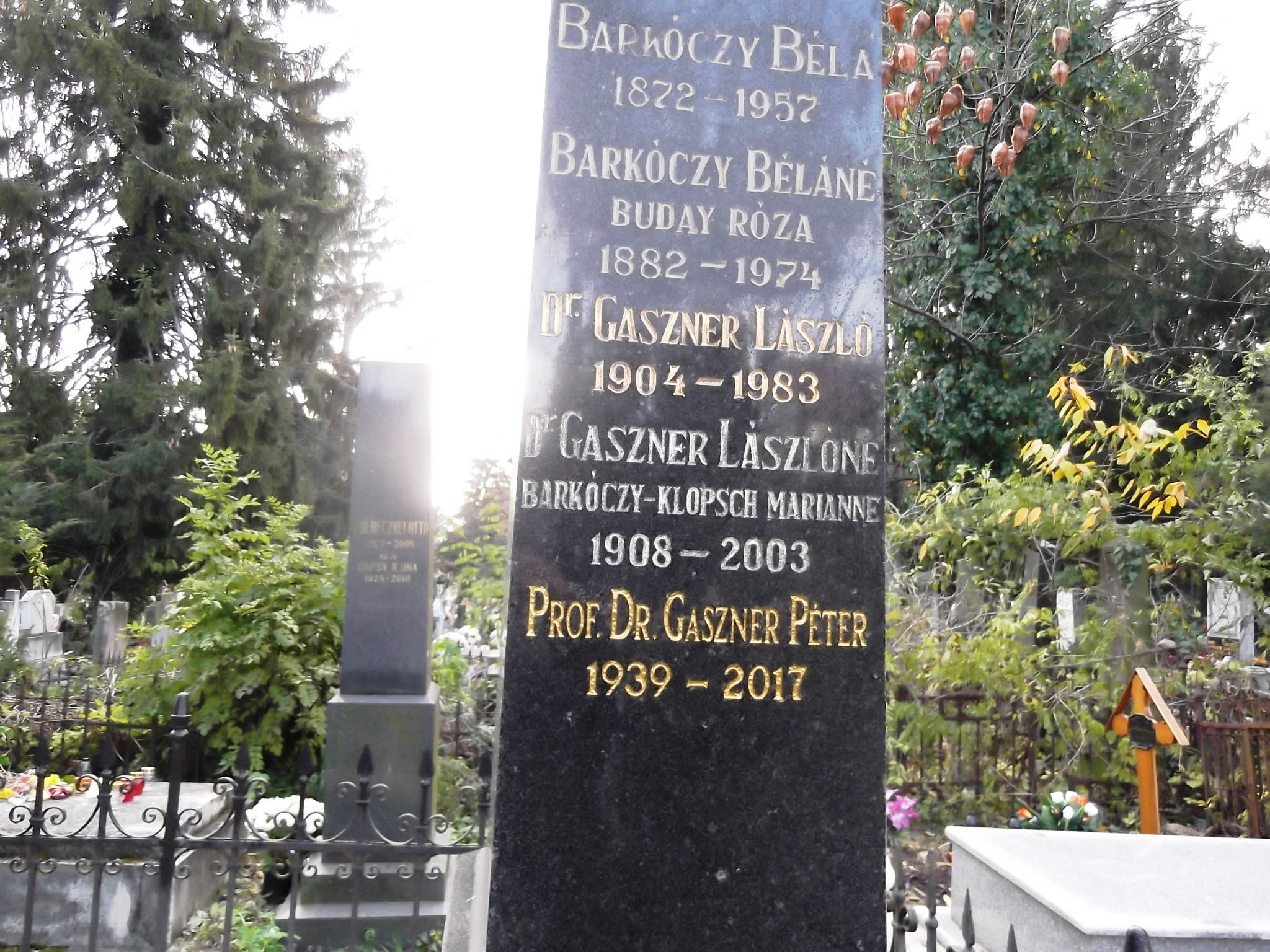
Péter Gaszner rests in the Barkóczy-Gaszner Crypt in Eger, in the Painful Mother-Hatvan Cemetery (next to the Szépasszony Valley).

== Personal life ==
The parents of Gaszner are László Gaszner (Komádi, November 4, 1904 – 1983) and Marianne Barkóczy Klopsch (Budapest, March 15, 1908 – 2003), a highschool teacher. His paternal grandparents were Károly Gaszner and Mária Kugler and his maternal grandparents were Béla Barkóczy (1872–1957) and Róza Buday (1882–1974). He completed his schools in Békéscsaba and Diósgyőr, later in the Újdiósgyőr High School. He received his medical degree from the Medical University of Debrecen. His children are Andrea (born 1965), Balázs (born 1969), Gábor (born 1978), and Mariann (born 1984). Three of his children became doctors; Mariann chose a career in economics. Gaszner rests in the Barkóczy-Gaszner crypt in Eger, in the Hatvani Cemetery (next to Szépasszony Valley).

== Career ==
After a short detour in Miskolc, he became a neurologist between 1963 and 1978 and then a psychiatrist at the Neurology and Mental Clinic of the Medical University of Pécs under the supervision of Professor Környey. For most of his career, from 1978 to 2007, he worked in the psychiatric department of the National Institute of Psychiatry and Neurology in Budapest. He spent twenty years of his more than 45-year teaching career as a professor at Semmelweis University, where he habilitated in 1995. He was the chief physician of the National Institute of Psychiatry and Neurology (OPNI, Lipótmező) between 1908 and 2007, until the closure of the institute. He led a class of one hundred and forty people.

In 1997, he became a Doctor of the Hungarian Academy of Sciences (DSc)
He is a member of the advisory board of the medical department of the Hungarian Academy of Sciences.

== Foreign research and recognition ==
- His most important professional study visits are to Gdańsk, one-year visits to Manchester, Umeå, Buenos Aires and several visits to Nashville, Tennessee (Vanderbilt University).
- Széchenyi professor scholarship
- Honorary member of the Swedish Psychiatric Association
- Honorary Doctor of the University of Buenos Aires

== Society memberships ==
- Secretary of the Neurological and Psychiatric Committee. Academic Almanac 1985 Part I. Members and scientific bodies of the Academy
- He has held senior positions in the World Association of Psychiatry (WPA) and Neuro-Psychopharmacology (CINP)
- President of the Hungarian Society of Psychopharmacology
- He is the founding editor-in-chief of the professional journal Neuropsychopharmacologia
- He served on the executive committee of the European College of Neuropsychopharmacology (ECNP) between 1987 and 1995.

== Specialty ==
His specialties were: sleep disorder, panic disorder, phobia, depression, bipolar disorder, anxiety disorders, sleep disorder, alcohol and individual life problems, relationship disorders, crisis situations, integration problems, obsessive-compulsive disorder, mood disorders, schizophrenia, menstrual disorders. For example, phobias and related anxiety disorders are the most common forms of mental illness, occurring in 20 to 40 percent of the population. 2.5-3 percent of the domestic population may suffer from obsessive-compulsive disorder. Schizophrenia occurs in 0.7-1% of the Hungarian population. These diseases can now be cured, more precisely, asymptomatic can be ensured if the patient cooperates with the doctor. In 2002, Péter Gaszner, on the healing effectiveness of psychiatry, said: “It is no coincidence that I was talking about asymptomatic and not healing. We can cure a disease for which we know for sure. Psychiatric treatments are not comparable to the effectiveness of treatments used in physical medicine. People's mental difficulties cannot be solved with chemicals. Drugs administered in psychiatry only serve to chemically suppress unpleasant mental manifestations, but this does not help the person to overcome their mental difficulty in the long run. It's no coincidence that when medicated patients stop taking the drug, they 'relapse': their symptoms recur, while psychiatrists usually say, 'they haven't taken their medication long enough,' but in reality, these drugs don't restore mental health and only suppress the symptoms for as long as they are taken.” Péter Gaszner was the president of the Hungarian Society of Psychopharmacology, as he specialized in psychopharmacology, as the pharmacological treatment of nerve and mental illnesses has significantly transformed therapy since the 1950s. Chlorpromazine was first discovered. From the 1970s, when selective compounds appeared, development accelerated even more. Péter Gaszner successfully used traditional psychotherapy in combination with medication. His research in this area was published, inter alia, in 1989, entitled “Pharmacological Treatment of Mental Illnesses”. He summarized it in his 139-page book.

== Selected works ==
- Mózsik Gyula, Gaszner Péter, Ludány Andrea és Jávor Tibor: Az egyszeri intravénásan adott, nagy dózisú (30,0-600,0 mg) atropin hatása az emberi gyomorsecretióra.( Effect of single intravenous high dose atropine (30.0-600.0 mg) on human gastric secretion) Orvosi Hetilap, 1974. szeptember (115. évfolyam) 1974-09-01 / 35.szám. szám
- Bódis Lóránt, Gaszner Péter és Radnai Béla: Nagy dózisú (50.0-600.0 mg) intravénásán adott atropin hatása a szívműködésre. (Effect of high-dose (50.0-600.0 mg) intravenous atropine on cardiac function) Orvosi Hetilap, 1976. március (117. évfolyam) 1976-03-28 / 13. szám.
- Gaszner Péter-Thomas A. Ban. CODE-HD : composite diagnostic evaluation of hyperthymic disorders CODE-HD : composite diagnostic evaluation of hyperthymic disorders; Bp., Animula. 1998.
- „The soul-diseases medication treatment” (In Hungarian); Bp., HungáriaSport RMV Nyomda. 1989.
- Gaszner Péter-Uriel Halbreich-Gustav Hoffmann. Psychiatry and the Law - Central European Psychiatry; Kiadó. Lundbeck Hungária Kft. Bp., 2000.
- Gaszner Péter- Ban Thomas A.: Complex diagnostic evaluation of hyperthyroid disorders; (In Hungarian); Kiadó Kalm-R Bt. 2007.Prospectus. In Hungarian
- CODE-HD : composite diagnostic evaluation of hyperthymic disorders A hyperthymiás zavarok komplex diagnosztikai értékelése = Composite diagnostic evaluation of hyperthymic disorders : CODE-HD / Gaszner Péter & Thomas. Kalmár Sándor, Kalmár Koppány. Kecskemét. Kalm-R Bt., 2007.
- Web of Science He publishes his first-ever “A” category publication in 37 international journals

== Evaluation of his scientific work ==
1. Péter Gaszner's recommendation for the academic title. 2000. Recommended academics: hu:Knoll József, Magyar Kálmán. Magyar Tudomány – A MTA folyóirata, 2000 (107. kötet = Új folyam 45. kötet) 2000 / 12. sz.
2. Péter Gaszner's recommendation for the academic title. 2003. Recommended academics: József Knoll, Kálmán Magyar, Emil Pásztor Részletek: “After his neuropathological work, he developed a procedure for uncomplicated atropine coma. He found that occasionally a hundred times the “usual” toxic dose could be given as a single parenteral dose. He was the first to describe the mechanism of the cholinergic and noradrenergic nervous system effects of antidepressants and neuroleptics in healthy volunteers and patients (Br. J. Clin. Pharmac., 9,112-113, 1980; Br. J. Clin. Pharmac. 9, 88-91, 1980). His new polydiagnostic nosological system, the Composite Diagnostic Evaluation of Hyperthymic Disorders (Gaszner, Ban; Animula, Budapest, 1998), is the most reliable method of psychiatric classification today. He was the first to describe the antidepressant selective reboxetine and the healing effect of clonazepam on drug withdrawal symptoms, sitting. the safety and novel use of clozapine (Progr. Neuro-Psychopharmac. Biol. Psychiat. 26, 603-607, 2002). His research work was primarily in the field of psychiatric and clinical psychopharmacology. 204, resp. his book chapter is in English. Impact factor: 61,298. He organized twelve international congresses and the CINP World Congress. !! ” Although he deserved the title of academician, he was not elected an academician by the Hungarian Academy of Sciences.
