= Szalmatercs =

- Coat of arms

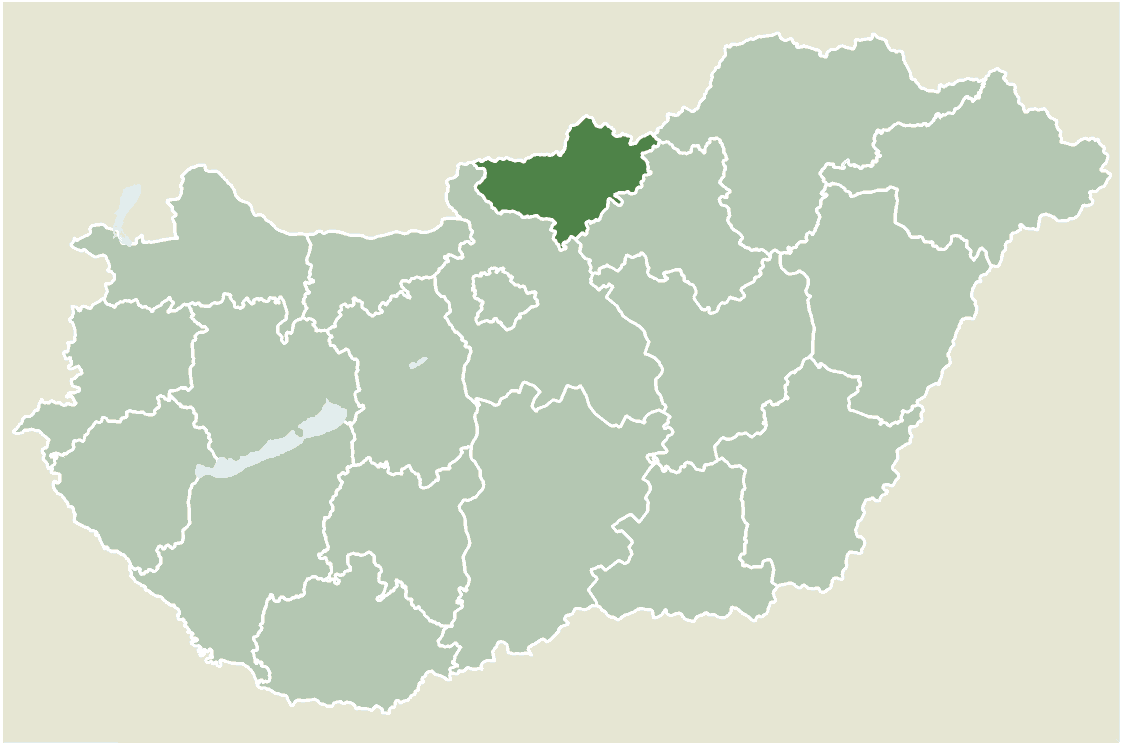
- Location of Nógrád county in Hungary

- Location of Szalmatercs
- Coordinates: 48.12242°N 19.63573°E
- Country: Hungary
- County: Nógrád

Government
  - Mayor: Dezső Szentes

Area
  - Total: 7.58 km^{2} (2.93 sq mi)

Population (2014)
  - Total: 416
  - Density: 54.88/km^{2} (142.1/sq mi)
- Time zone: UTC+1 (CET)
  - Summer (DST): UTC+2 (CEST)
- Postal code: 3163
- Area code: 32

Szalmatercs is a village in Nógrád county, Hungary.

== History ==
The area was settled in the mid-10th century by Pecheneg tribes, including the Tomaj clan, who owned land in Losonc (Lučenec). The “Szalma” part of the village's name comes from the Pecheneg word for border guard. “Tercs” is of Slavic origin, possibly meaning target. A Papal tithing list from 1332 to 1337 represents the first documentary evidence of the village. The inhabitants apparently moved to the site of the present village from a nearby valley.

In 1548, the two main local landowners were the infamous Ferenc Bebek and the famed defender of the Bussa (Bušince) fortress Mihály Szalmatercsy. In the course of the second half of the 16th century, the region was captured and occupied by Ottoman forces. Under Ottoman rule, the parish church of Szalmatercs was destroyed. (It was not until 2006 that a replacement Catholic church was built in the village.)

In 1598, the village came under the ownership of Mihály Tercsy. By this time, the village comprised two parts, separated by the Ménes stream (Ménes-patak). Little Szalmatercs (latterly Pusztatercs) was inhabited by the nobles, while the local serfs lived in Great Szalmatercs, to the north of the stream.

In the first half of the 17th century, the village belonged to Ipolymagyari (Uhorské) and was owned by Anna Majtényi Kosztolányi. In 1670, the village was mentioned as the feudal estate of István Koháry, while in 1720 it was recorded as a noble parish. In the 18th century, a part of the village became a feudal parish once more. The other part constituted a separate village until 1864.

Local landowners included the Pongrácz family, Ábrahám Komjáthy, Ádám Szilassy, László Plachy and László Ruttkay. In the second half of the 18th century, Károly Ruttkay built a mansion (kúria) in the village, which still stands.

== Demographics ==
In 1910, Szalmatercs had 450 inhabitants: 425 Roman Catholics, 17 Lutherans, and 8 people of Jewish religion. In 2011, there were 460 inhabitants, including 367 Catholics, 8 Lutherans, and 17 non-denominational religious believers. The village has a significant Roma minority population.

== Geography ==
Szalmatercs is situated in the Ménes-patak valley, in the northeastern part of the Cserhát region. Surrounded by rolling hills and game-rich forests, the village lies within the Karancsság topographical region and the Novohrad – Nograd Geopark. The Karancs mountain (729 m), the highest elevation in the area, is located 11 km to the east-north-east. Route 22 links the village with nearby towns and with Budapest, Hungary's capital. Szalmatercs lies 12 km from Szécsény, 18 km from Salgótarján, 29 km from Hollókő, 30 km from Balassagyarmat, and 38 km from Lučenec (Losonc).

== Climate ==
Szalmatercs has a humid continental climate (Dfb).

Climate data for Szalmatercs
Month	Jan	Feb	Mar	Apr	May	Jun	Jul	Aug	Sep	Oct	Nov	Dec	Year
Mean daily maximum °C (°F)	0.8 (33.4)	4.4 (39.9)	10.1 (50.2)	16.4 (61.5)	21.5 (70.7)	24.4 (75.9)	26.4 (79.5)	26.0 (78.8)	22.1 (71.8)	16.1 (61.0)	7.8 (46.0)	2.5 (36.5)	14.9 (58.8)
Daily mean °C (°F)	−2.5 (27.5)	0.6 (33.1)	5.2 (41.4)	10.5 (50.9)	15.3 (59.5)	18.4 (65.1)	20.0 (68.0)	19.5 (67.1)	15.9 (60.6)	10.6 (51.1)	4.4 (39.9)	−0.4 (31.3)	9.8 (49.6)
Mean daily minimum °C (°F)	−5.8 (21.6)	−3.2 (26.2)	0.3 (32.5)	4.8 (40.6)	9.2 (48.6)	12.4 (54.3)	13.6 (56.5)	13.1 (55.6)	9.8 (49.6)	5.2 (41.4)	1.1 (34.0)	−3.2 (26.2)	4.8 (40.6)
Average precipitation mm (inches)	31 (1.2)	32 (1.3)	31 (1.2)	42 (1.7)	66 (2.6)	73 (2.9)	55 (2.2)	57 (2.2)	45 (1.8)	41 (1.6)	54 (2.1)	40 (1.6)	567 (22.4)

== Gallery ==
http://www.infonograd.hu/external/uploaded_images/5224939d41b02.jpg

== Notable people ==
Ernő Bánk

== International relations ==
Szalmatercs, Hungary is twinned with:

- Slovakia: Bušince (Bussa) (2014)
