= Margit Tevan =

Hungarian goldsmith

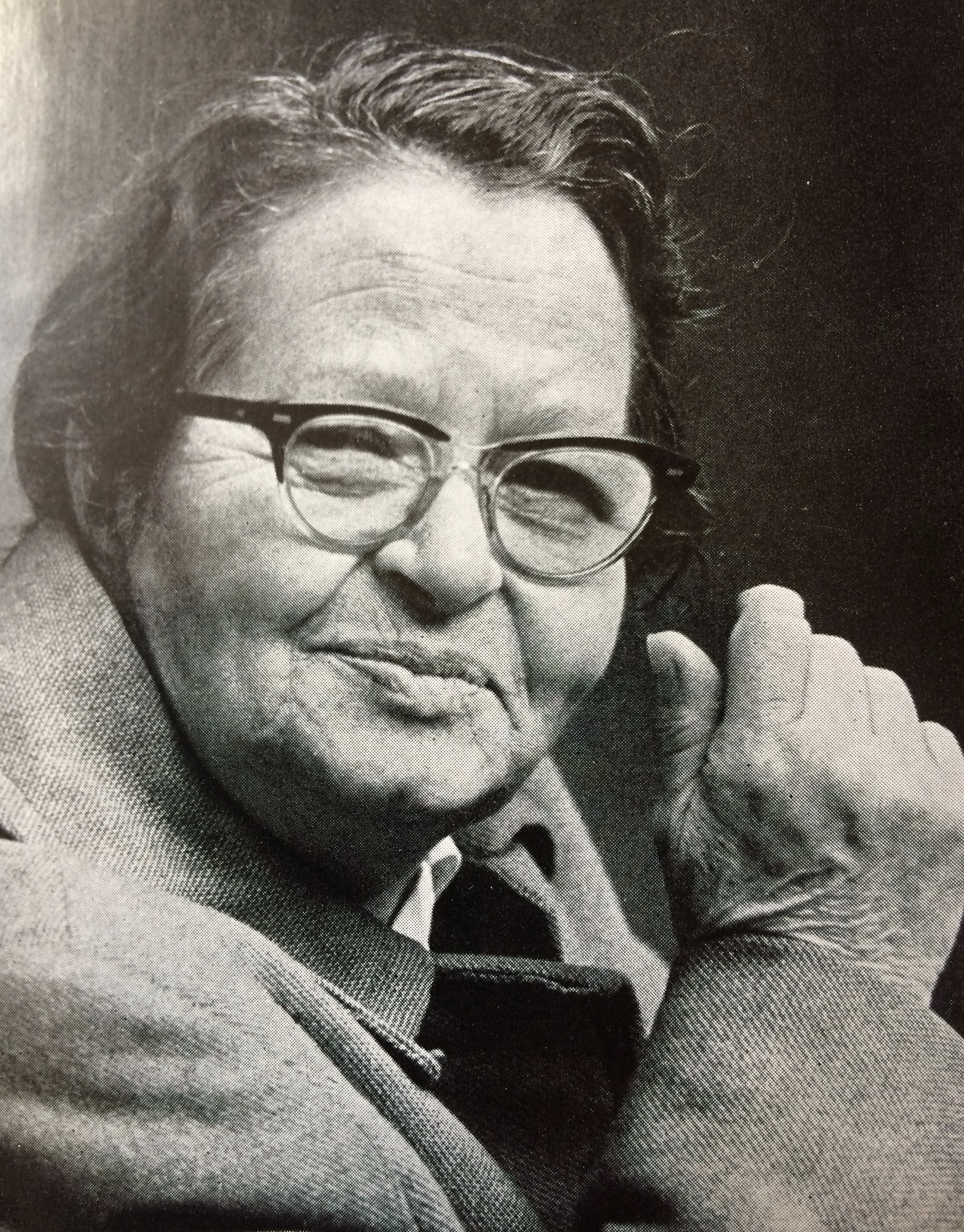
- Born: 18 January 1901; Békéscsaba, Hungary
- Died: 3 November 1978 (aged 77); Budapest
- Education: Academy of Applied Arts, Budapest
- Known for: Goldsmithing
- Spouse: Miklós Engel
- Children: Engel Tevan István
- Awards: Silver medal at the Milan Triennial VII of 1940; Mihály Munkácsy Award

Signature
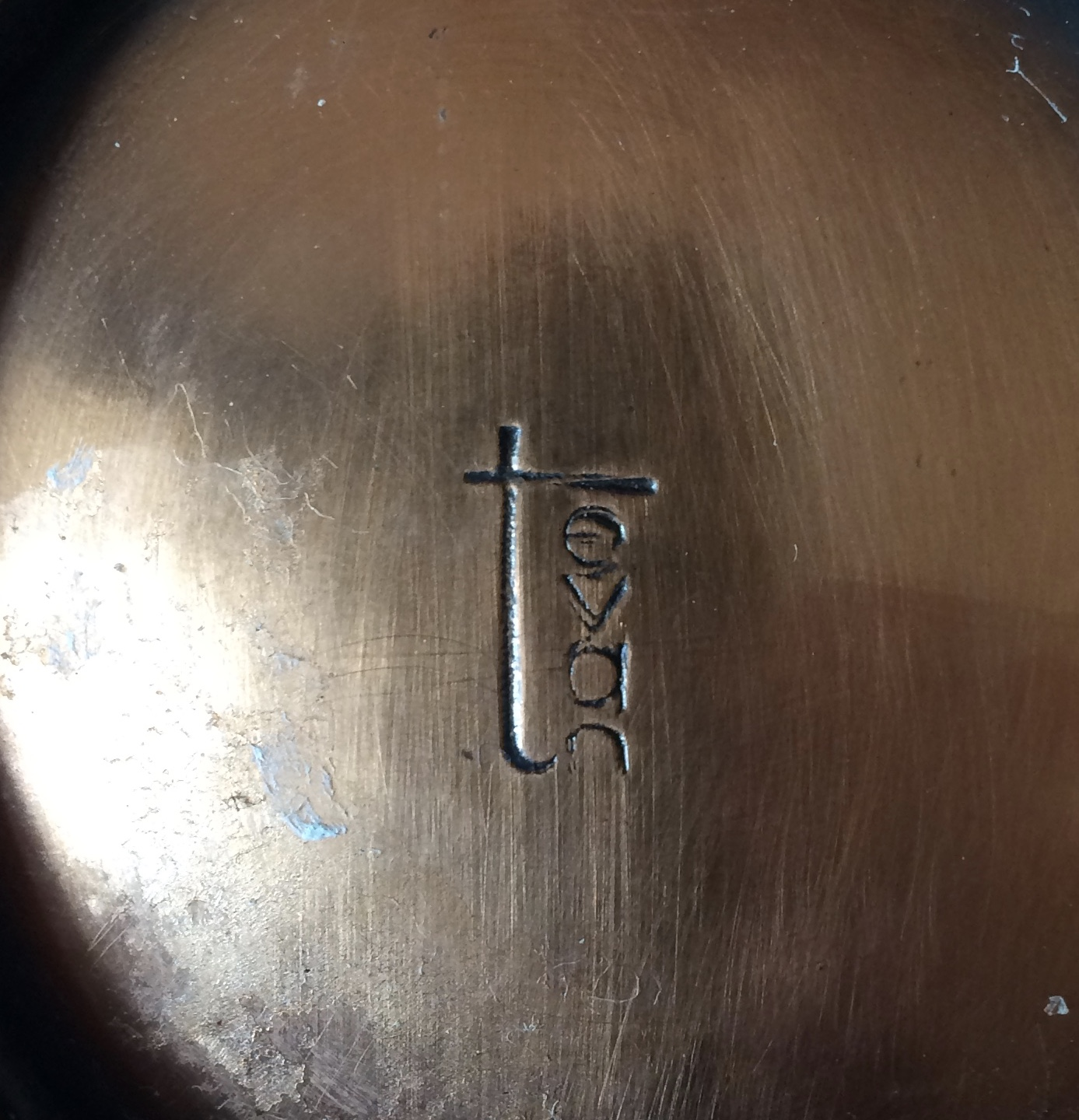

Margit Tevan (18 January 1901 – 3 November 1978) was a Hungarian goldsmith.

== Studies and training ==
Margit Tevan was born on 18 January 1901 in Békéscsaba in Hungary into a Jewish family whose father was running an editing house. She studied at the Academy of Applied Arts in Budapest and after one year specialized with some of the most famous goldsmiths of the time: Richard Zutt and Ferenc (Francis) Kiss. Not being interested in making jewels, she later joined Arpád Vértes' workshop which was better known under the name of "Stúdió" (1927–1928). In 1927 she married the chemical engineer Miklós Engel and moved to Budapest. By creating boxes and plates, she innovates the goldsmith tradition which at the time was more interested in making vases and bowls.

== Influence and creations ==
The influence of the Bauhaus school is evident in Tevan's early work. She then continued her artistic development towards an archaic romanticism, influenced by Romanesque art and the simplicity of the motifs which she used, especially in her friezes which decorate her boxes and plates. Many of the objects which she produced were hand-hammered silver-leafed copper.

== War and persecution ==
Between 1944 and 1945, Tevan was forced to live in the international ghetto of Budapest and obtained a safe conduct passport from the Swedish authorities. She continued to work during the Communist era where she kept her poetic register with smaller works that are sometimes offered as presents. References to both Jewish and Christian culture appear in Tevan's work.

== Acknowledgements and prizes ==
Tevan participated in numerous exhibitions and received a Diplôme d'honneur for her work during the Paris World Exhibition in 1937. She also obtained a similar diploma during the 1939 New York World Fair. She won the silver medal at the Milan Triennial VII of 1940. In 1957, she won the Munkácsy Prize, the highest artistic recognition in Hungary, as well as numerous other prizes between 1971 and 1976. She died in Budapest on 3 November 1978. Her son, Engel Tevan István, was born in 1936, worked as a well-known book illustrator, and died in 1996.

== Gallery ==
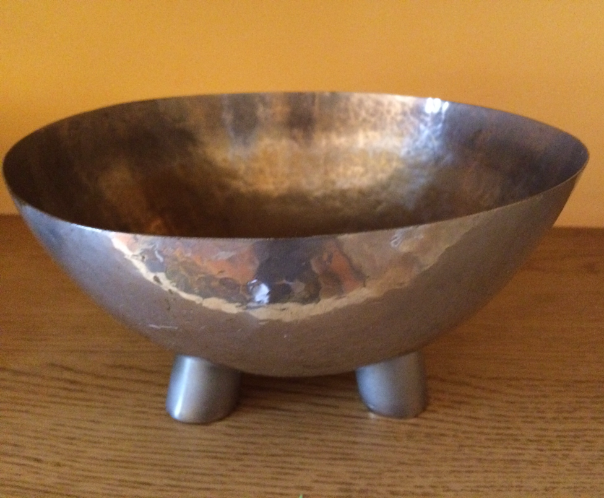

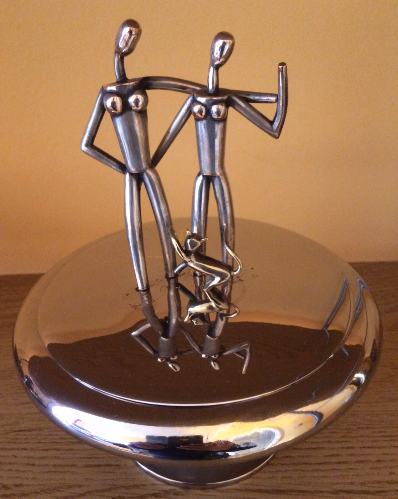

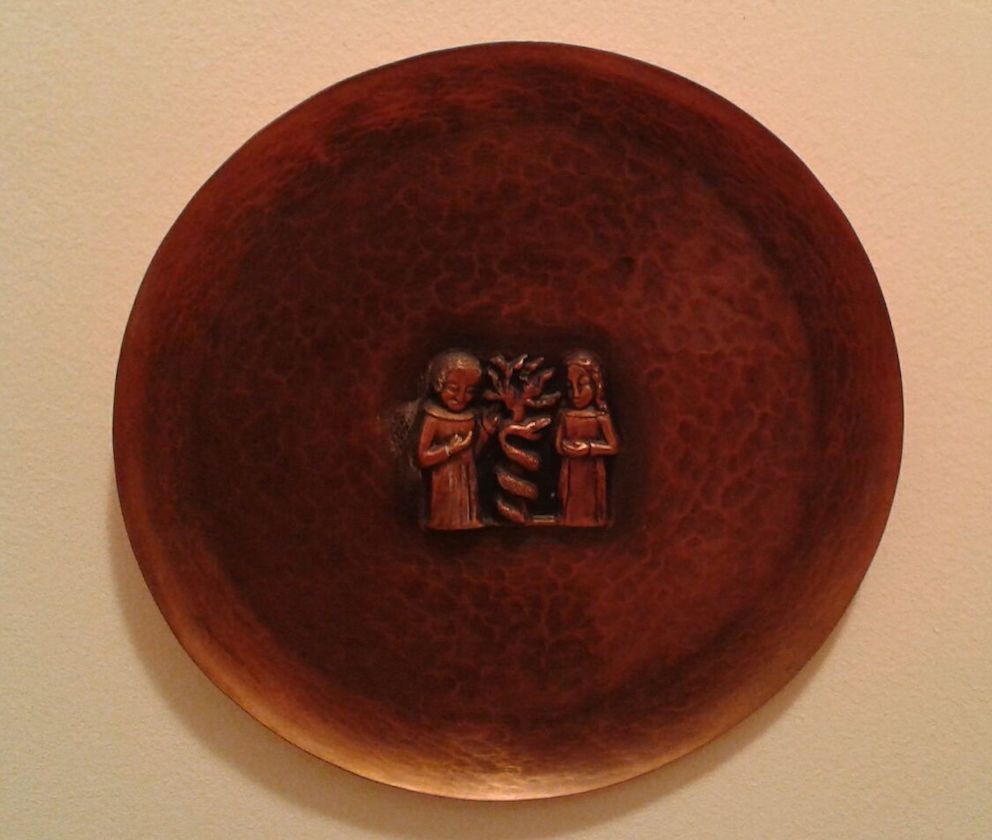

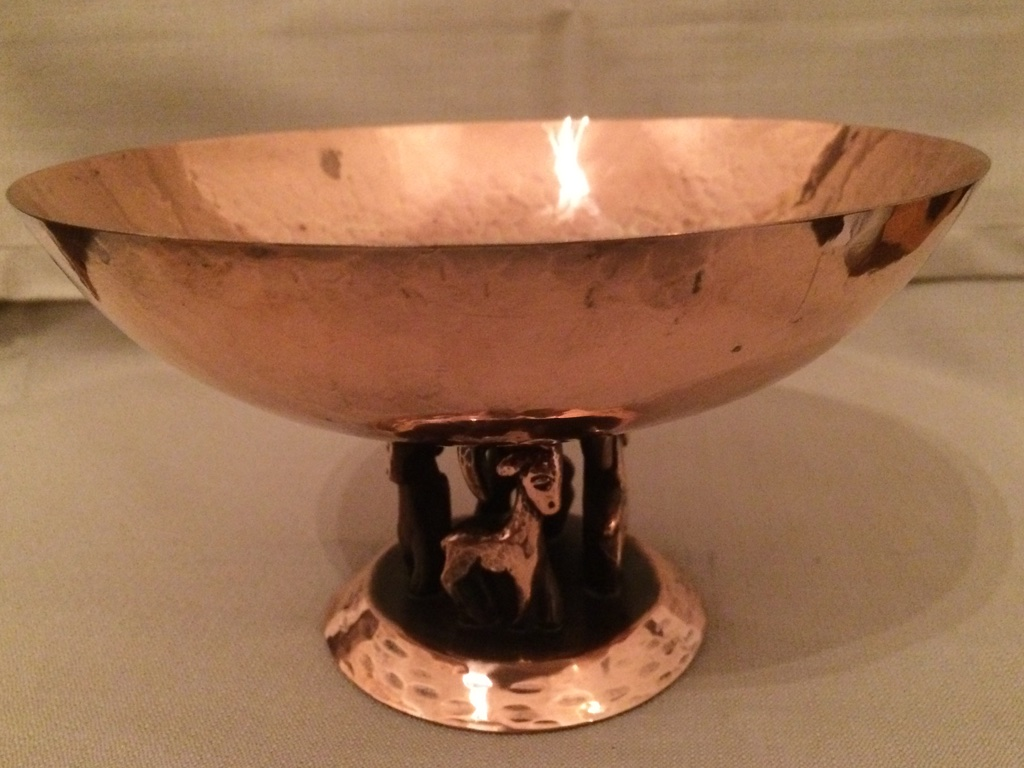

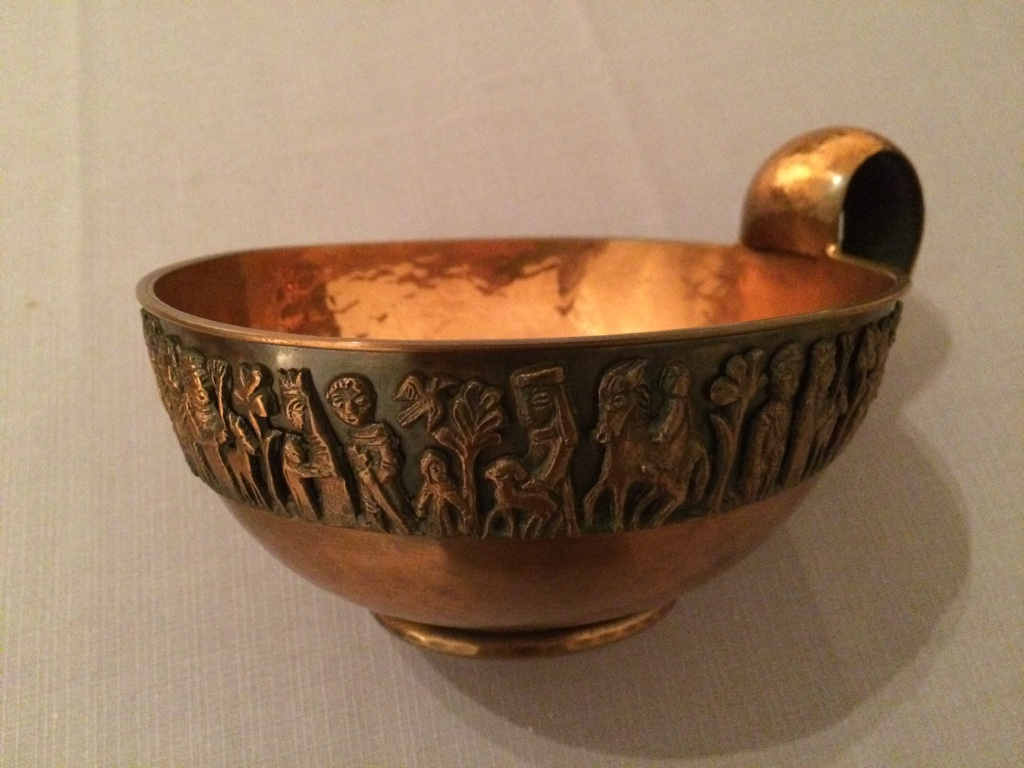
