= Lili Ország =

Hungarian painter

- Born: Lili Ország; 8 August 1926; Ungvár
- Died: 1 October 1978 (aged 52); Budapest, Hungary
- Movement: Surrealism

Lili Ország (born as Oesterreicher) 8 August 1926 – 1 October 1978) was a Hungarian painter.
