= Ritta Boemm =

Hungarian artist (1868–1948)

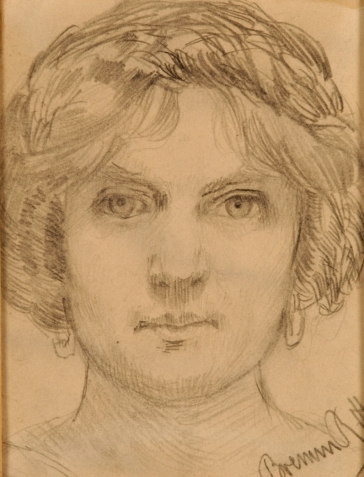
Self portrait of Ritta Boemm

Ritta Boemm (1868 – 1948) was a Hungarian artist. She was considered talented among Dresden's women artists. Her gouache pictures dealing with Hungarian subjects, a "Village Street", a "Peasant Farm", a "Churchyard", exhibited at Dresden in 1892, were well drawn and full of sentiment, but lacking in color sense and power. She worked unevenly and seemed pleased when she succeeded in setting a scene well. She also painted portraits, mostly in pastel, which were described as spirited, but not especially good likenesses. What she could do in the way of color was noted in her "Village Street in Winter", a picture of moderate size, in which the light was exquisite. However, most of her paintings were less notable than this one.
