= Gábor Laurenczy =

Hungarian chemist and academic (born 1954)

- Born: 1954 (age 71–72); Hungarian People's Republic
- Occupations: Chemist and academic

Academic background
- Education: BS., Chemistry; Ph.D., Inorganic Chemistry
- Alma mater: Kossuth University

Gábor Laurenczy is a Hungarian-Swiss chemist and academic. He is a Professor Emeritus at the École Polytechnique Fédérale de Lausanne. He is academician, External Member of the Hungarian Academy of Sciences.

Laurenczy's research interests lie in the field of reaction kinetics, primarily focusing on hydrogen storage, hydrogenation and catalytic activation of small molecules. He is the recipient of the Rudolf Fabinyi Memorial Prize by The Hungarian Chemical Society.

== Education ==
Laurenczy earned a Master's degree in Chemistry from Kossuth University (Debrecen, Hungary) in 1978. Subsequently, he pursued his Ph.D. in Inorganic Chemistry at the same institution, completing it in 1980.

== Career ==
Laurenczy began his academic career in 1984 in Kossuth University as an assistant professor. In 1985 he moved to Switzerland (UNIL). In 1991, he made his habilitation (Hungarian Academy of Sciences, Budapest). In the same year, he was appointed as Maître Assistant at the University of Lausanne, followed by an appointment as a maître d'enseignement et de recherche at the same institution in 1997. He also served as the visiting professor at the Université de Bourgogne in 2007. In 2010, he was appointed as professor at the École Polytechnique Fédérale de Lausanne, a role that he served until 2019. As of 2019, he is the professor emeritus at the École Polytechnique Fédérale de Lausanne. In 2022, he was elected as an External Member of the Hungarian Academy of Sciences.

== Research ==
Laurenczy is most known for his works on hydrogen storage & generation, catalytic activation of small molecules, the development of medium and high-pressure equipment, iron catalysts, and reactions with water-soluble compounds. He holds patents to numerous projects including Hydrogen production from formic acid and Direct carbon dioxide hydrogenation to formic acid in acidic media. In addition, he has authored numerous publications, including book chapters and articles in peer-reviewed journals.

=== Hydrogenation and dehydrogenation of compounds ===
Lauranczy's research on the Hydrogenation of compounds has focused on developing new catalysts, elucidating reaction mechanisms, optimizing processes, overcoming challenges in hydrogenating specific substrates, and enabling selective transformations. He evaluated the effectiveness of hydrido-ruthenium(II) complexes as catalysts in hydrogenation reactions and investigated the catalytic hydrogenation process of carbon dioxide (CO_{2}) and bicarbonate ions in an aqueous solution by employing a water-soluble ruthenium(II) complex. In a collaborative study, he explored the pathways of CO_{2} hydrogenation utilizing a ruthenium dihydride complex, while identifying crucial intermediates, emphasizing the significance of the trans-form of the complex, and highlighting the importance of preserving formate ion stability and ensuring efficient formic acid removal to enhance catalytic efficiency. Furthermore, he investigated the hydrogenation of functionalized aromatic compounds using water-dispersed Rh nanoparticles stabilized with PVP and demonstrated the ability to control chemoselectivity in Rh nanoparticle catalysts by selectively poisoning sites with phosphine ligands. Additionally, he presented a technique for the direct hydrogenation of carbon dioxide into formic acid through the utilization of a homogeneous ruthenium catalyst in an aqueous medium containing dimethyl sulfoxide (DMSO), without the inclusion of any supplementary substances. In 2017, he collaborated with Yuichiro Himeda and others and introduced an approach utilizing formic acid as a hydrogen donor, combined with iridium catalysts and electronically tailored ligands, to enhance the selectivity of methanol synthesis from carbon dioxide (CO_{2}). More recently in 2018, he addressed the problem of reducing energy-intensive processes in the production of lignin-derived chemicals by developing a technique that utilized precisely engineered Rh nanoparticles evenly distributed within sub-micrometer carbon hollow spheres for the targeted reduction of lignin-derived substances at moderate temperatures.

Laurenczy's dehydrogenation research has concentrated on the quantitative dehydrogenation of formic acid in an aqueous solution using iron as catalysts. Moreover, he examined the process of formic acid dehydrogenation facilitated by water-soluble complexes of ruthenium m-triphenylphosphinetrisulfonate (TPPTS) and contributed to the understanding of the carbon dioxide-formic acid systems under H_{2} and CO_{2} pressures. Focusing his research efforts on selective dehydrogenation of HCOOH, he investigated the correlation between the stability and effectiveness of catalysts in the process of formic acid dehydrogenation, and developed a catalytic framework designed to facilitate the precise dehydrogenation of formic acid within an aqueous environment.

=== Hydrogen storage ===
Laurenczy's hydrogen storage research has led to the development of hydrogen storage technologies. He investigated the immobilization of a highly efficient homogeneous catalyst used in the formic acid decomposition process to produce hydrogen and carbon dioxide and outlined different methods employed to immobilize the catalyst, ruthenium-TPPTS, including ion exchange, coordination, and physical absorption techniques. His collaborative research with Matthias Beller and others established formic acid as an ideal hydrogen storage material due to its liquid state at room temperature and non-toxic properties. His assessment of cesium formate and bicarbonate salts for hydrogen storage and transportation demonstrated that combining bicarbonate hydrogenation and formate decomposition reactions in water offered viable and replenishable hydrogen battery solutions. While evaluating the progress in catalytic processes for efficient hydrogen storage and utilization, his work focused on liquid-based systems such as formic acid and alcohol and highlighted significant advancements in CO_{2} hydrogenation and dehydrogenation reactions, with a strong emphasis on the development of sustainable and Earth-abundant catalysts.

=== High pressure kinetic studies ===
During his investigation of the Bray reaction in enclosed environments and the influence of elevated pressure on the reaction, Laurenczy discovered that oxygen acts as an independent species and demonstrated that subjecting the reaction to high pressure (2000 bar) induced significant oscillation changes. Focusing on the stopped-flow technique, he conducted research on the interactions between specific divalent transition metal ions and also developed a high-pressure stopped-flow spectrometer capable of studying rapid reactions using absorbance and fluorescence detection. In related research, his study established the role of the dimeric form of 1-methoxy-3-methyl carbonatotetrabutyldistannoxane as an intermediate in synthesizing dimethyl carbonate, while also highlighting the potential existence of a novel trinuclear di-n-butyltin(IV) compound, possibly derived from the organometallic precursor n-Bu_{2}Sn(OCH_{3})_{2}. In his investigation of the catalytic capability of a uniform iridium compound in the formic acid disproportionation process, leading to methanol production, he demonstrated the potential for high yields and achieved yields of up to 75% in deuterium oxide (D_{2}O) through this process.

=== Reaction mechanisms ===
Laurenczy's research on reaction mechanisms has resulted in an improved understanding of catalytic reactions and synthetic methodologies, including the design of efficient and selective transformations, as well as the synthesis of complex molecules with applications in medicine, materials science. Moreover, his examination of aqueous catalytic reactions demonstrated successful transmission of carbon dioxide into formic acid and methanol utilizing an iridium complex within an aqueous medium, while operating under ambient temperatures.

== Awards and honors ==
- 2022 – Rudolf Fabinyi Memorial Prize, The Hungarian Chemical Society

== Selected articles ==
- Fellay, C., Dyson, P. J., & Laurenczy, G. (2008). A viable hydrogen‐storage system based on selective formic acid decomposition with a ruthenium catalyst. Angewandte Chemie International Edition, 47(21), 3966–3968.
- Boddien, A., Mellmann, D., Gärtner, F., Jackstell, R., Junge, H., Dyson, P. J., Laurenczy, G., ... & Beller, M. (2011). Efficient dehydrogenation of formic acid using an iron catalyst. Science, 333(6050), 1733–1736.
- Scolaro, C., Bergamo, A., Brescacin, L., Delfino, R., Cocchietto, M., Laurenczy, G., ... & Dyson, P. J. (2005). In vitro and in vivo evaluation of ruthenium (II)− arene PTA complexes. Journal of Medicinal Chemistry, 48(12), 4161–4171.
- Grasemann, M., & Laurenczy, G. (2012). Formic acid as a hydrogen source–recent developments and future trends. Energy & Environmental Science, 5(8), 8171–8181.
- Moret, Séverine, Dyson, Paul J., Laurenczy, Gábor, (2014). Direct synthesis of formic acid from carbon dioxide by hydrogenation in acidic media. Nature Communications. 5 (1): 4017.
- Sordakis, K., Tang, C., Vogt, L. K., Junge, H., Dyson, P. J., Beller, M., & Laurenczy, G. (2018). Homogeneous catalysis for sustainable hydrogen storage in formic acid and alcohols. Chemical Reviews, 118(2), 372–433.
