= Marianna Schmidt =

Hungarian-Canadian artist (1918–2005)

- Born: 1918; Nagybecskerek, Hungary
- Died: May 27, 2005 (aged 86–87); Vancouver, British Columbia, Canada
- Education: Vancouver School of Art
- Known for: Printmaker, painter

Marianna Schmidt (1918 – May 27, 2005) was a Hungarian-Canadian artist who worked primarily as a printmaker and painter.

== Life ==
Schmidt was born in Nagybecskerek, Hungary (later Yugoslavia) in 1918.

Her early life was disrupted by war and the loss of her entire family. She spent years as a displaced person in Europe before arriving in Canada in 1953. She graduated in Printmaking from the Vancouver School of Art in 1965. She Emigrated to Canada in the late fifties.

== Collections ==
Schmidt's work is held in numerous Canadian public collections including the Vancouver Art Gallery, the Burnaby Art Gallery, the Art Gallery of Greater Victoria, the Winnipeg Art Gallery, the Art Gallery of Alberta, the National Gallery of Canada, the Canada Council Art Bank, the National Gallery of Australia, the Museum of Contemporary Art in Lima, Peru, the Museum of Fine Arts, Caracas, Venezuela, the Museum of Modern Art in New York, the Seattle Art Museum, and the Stedelijk Museum voor Actuele Kunst in Ghent, Belgium.

== Education and work ==
Schmidt's artistic practice included painting, drawing, printmaking, and collage as well as "etching, lithography, computer art, plastic sculpture, and photography."

At age 42, Schmidt entered the Vancouver School of Art (later Emily Carr Institute of Art & Design, and now Emily Carr University) where she studied from 1960 until 1965. Schmidt was the oldest in her class that included Ann Kipling, Richard Turner, Irene Whittome and Anna Wong. Influential instructors included Orville Fisher and Jack Shadbolt.

An early history of dislocation underpins Schmidt's work. The tone of her work ranges from distraught and angst-ridden to whimsical. "[A]ll Schmidt's art manifests her paradoxical sense of whimsy and brutality, humour and despair, anxiety and fierce conviction." She was "encouraged by postwar abstractionism surrealist juxtapositions and the general freeing up of aesthetic restraints." In the later part of the 1960s, she focused on the expression of eccentric figuration. She moved from etching to lithography, screen printing and even a number of sculptures during the 1970s.

She exhibited widely and received numerous accolades. Her printmaking was recognized internationally. In 1997 she was among 96 artists invited to participate in the 10th International Biennial Exhibition of Prints in Tokyo.
