= Éva Bednay =

Hungarian painter (1927–2017)

- Born: 1 May 1927; Budapest, Kingdom of Hungary
- Died: 21 June 2017 (aged 90); Bonn, Germany
- Other names: Eve B'ay
- Occupation: painter

Éva Bednay (also known as Eve B'ay, 1 May 1927 – 21 June 2017) was a Hungarian painter, known for her mixed-media work which employed layering of paint and lacquer, often incorporating pieces of metal, plastic and textiles. Trained in Budapest, she lived in the United States in the early 1970s before settling in Bonn, Germany. In 2009 an exhibition of her life's work was hosted in the suburb of Wassenaar in the De Paauw Palace by the Hungarian and Germany Embassies. The following year, Central European Cultural Institute in Budapest hosted the first retrospective of her works in her home country since the early 1980s. She has works in public collections in Germany and the Netherlands, as well as paintings in private collections.

== Biography ==
Bednay was born on 1 May 1927, in Budapest in the Kingdom of Hungary. In 1946, she graduated from the College of Applied Arts in Budapest, having trained with Endre Domanovszky, Kacziány Aladár, and Erzsébet Páris. She married Dezső Bednay, who operated a furniture showroom on István Boulevard, from which he designed furnishings, interiors and enamel art pieces. Early in her career, she and her husband taught art at the State Institute of Disabled People, training young people to gain marketable skills in art.

In the 1950s, as her husband moved more into fine art, Bednay's style changed from Art Nouveau to more modern means of expression, embracing an abstract style, influenced by the works of Marc Chagall, Henri Matisse, Amedeo Modigliani, and Picasso, though she did not incorporate Western trends toward expressionism or pop art. "[T]o reinforce the relationship between artist and audience", her work ignored trends of various art movements, following the philosophical path of strict aesthetic constructionism, preserving the timelessness of art and conforming to its canonical tenets.

Like other artists of her era, Bednay was required to join the Foundation of Fine Arts, which in turn after judging the works would buy them for minimal prices and market them abroad. This limited the artists' autonomy over their own productions and denied them an audience with their peers and citizens of Hungary. Despite the restrictions, Bednay organized a solo exhibition in 1968 in Budapest. By the early 1970s, she and her husband made the decision to leave Hungary in search of artistic freedom and moved to New York in 1972. In 1973, Bednay hosted a solo exhibition in Manhattan at the Gallery Zalaváry and participated in group showings in Cleveland and New York City. In 1974, the couple relocated to Bonn, Germany, but she continued to participate in art shows in the United States, including the Artists International in New York in 1974 and 1977. In addition to exhibits held in Bonn in 1978, 1983 and 1987, Bednay produced individual exhibits in Cologne (1980), Zürich (1984), Bergheim (1992), and Münster (1998), among other group participation in various locations.

== Style ==
As visual arts gained prominence in the 1950s, Bednay began experimenting with new materials and techniques. In the 1960s, she developed a style of rustic collage, using layers of paint and lacquer to which she affixed pieces of metal, plastic, and textile. After her move to Germany, Bednay incorporated more textiles, using the colors and patterns of fabric in her works. She explored many different types of techniques and characteristically often combined media, including graphics, oil paint, oil pastels, and textiles to create her pieces. In the 1980s, she began to create portraits and imaginary landscapes using silk and oil pastels.

In 1981, Bednay participated in an exhibition Tisztelet a szülőföldnek (Respect for the Homeland) at the Műcsarnok in Budapest, which featured artworks by the Hungarian diaspora. Her works would not be shown again in Hungary for decades, though the press often covered her events abroad. In 2009, a month-long exhibition of her life's work was hosted in the suburb of Wassenaar at the De Paauw Palace by the Hungarian and Germany Embassies. The exhibit was part of the celebrations for the 20th anniversary of the reunification of Europe and showed the important role art played in bridging the political divisions of her time. Another show, Budapest – New York – Bonn – Budapest was hosted in 2010 in Budapest at the Central European Cultural Institute. Heijo Klein, an art historian, who heads the Visual Arts Studio at the Institute of Art History at the University of Bonn, published a monograph for the exhibition on Bednay in English, German, and Hungarian evaluating the impact of her body of work.

== Death and legacy ==
Bednay died on 21 June 2017 in Bonn, Germany. Works by Bednay are in public collections at the State Museum of Bergheim, the State Museum of Siegburg, the University of Bonn, the University of Münster, and the Hungarian Embassy in The Hague, among others, as well as in private collections.
