= Szilárd Suhajda =

Hungarian mountaineer (1982–2023)

- Suhajda Szilárd
- Born: June 29, 1982; Békéscsaba, Hungary
- Disappeared: May 25–26, 2023; Mount Everest
- Died: c. May 26, 2023 (aged 40); Mount Everest
- Occupations: Mountaineer, English teacher
- Years active: 2007-2023
- Known for: First Hungarian summit of K2
- Family: Suhajda

Szilárd Suhajda (June 29, 1982 – disappeared May 25–26, 2023) was a Hungarian mountaineer known for his ascents of eight-thousanders without supplementary oxygen. During his climbing career, he successfully summited Broad Peak, K2 (solo), and Lhotse, and was lost during a solo climb on Mount Everest.

== Climbing ==
Szilárd first began climbing with his grandfather. As a child, he went to hiking camp with his school spending weeks each summer sleeping in tents and exploring the mountains. Later, he fell in love with mountaineering after reading stories about István Benedek, Reinhold Messner and Emil Zsigmondy. After his studies, he moved to Esztergom where he joined a climbing group, visiting the Carpathian Mountains, Transylvania and the Alps. After climbing Mont Blanc in 2007, he dedicated himself to the mountains.

In the winter of 2008, he and a friend Csabi Kosztán were trapped in an avalanche in the Austrian Alps. The experience had a significant impact on him, later he recounted the dangerous situation was due to carelessness. Rather than dissuading him from climbing, it encouraged him to complete every climbing course available, encouraging him to improve his skills and become a more responsible climber.

In 2010, he gave up his job as an English teacher and moved to Brighton in England to earn enough money to fund his first climbing expedition in Asia.

=== Himalayas ===
After saving for two years and working seven days a week, Szilárd successfully funded his first climbing expedition in the Karakorum. The expedition was inexpensive, with Szilárd buying his down jacket secondhand on eBay to make things as affordable as possible. In 2012, he travelled to climb Gasherbrum I and II, but was unsuccessful. He then returned to Britain, working overtime for the next two years to fund his next trip.

In 2014 he returned to the Himalayas, successfully summitting Broad Peak, his first eight-thousander without supplementary oxygen.

The next year, he made his first attempt at summitting K2, but had to abandon the attempt at 7,400 meters due to avalanche risk. In 2016, he made another unsuccessful attempt at the summit with the Johnnie Walker K2 Expedition.

==== First Everest attempt ====
In 2016, he announced he would take part in the first Hungarian attempt to summit Everest without supplemental oxygen. His climbing partner for the expedition would be Dávid Klein, a mountaineer who had attempted Everest eight times previously, and whom had accompanied him on his previous expeditions to K2.

The self-financed Hungarian expedition set off in 2017. During the expedition, Szilárd fell ill while climbing Everest and had to abandon his summit attempt at 7,900m. At camp II, he began vomiting and was forced to come down the mountain. After suffering from stomach problems for three weeks, he lost 15 kilograms.

In 2018, Szilárd attempted 8,080-metre Gasherbrum I and the 8,035-meter Gasherbrum II once again without supplemental oxygen or porters, but had to abandon his summit attempts due to poor weather. The failure of the expedition, coupled with the failure to summit on the previous Everest and K2 attempts, received criticism in Hungary.

==== Eseményhorizont ====
In 2019, as part of the Esemeny Horizont team, he became the first Hungarian to summit K2, doing so solo and without supplementary oxygen. It was his third attempt to climb K2, taking 15 hours to reach the summit from camp IV. After the successful summit, Szilárd was able to quit teaching and devoted himself full time to planning expeditions, lecturing and guiding tours.

In 2021, he attempted Dhaulagiri I again alongside Dávid Klein, but had to abort his summit attempt at 7,600 m due to poor weather conditions.

=== "Big Five" project ===
After climbing with partner Dávid Klein for several years in 2022, he announced their Eseményhorizont project would end. Szilárd instead would focus on summitting the remainder of the world's five highest peaks solo, Mount Everest, Kangchenjunga, Lhotse and Makalu.

Later that year, he successfully summitted Lhotse, solo and without supplementary oxygen. He was the third Hungarian to summit the world's fourth highest peak.

==== Final climb ====
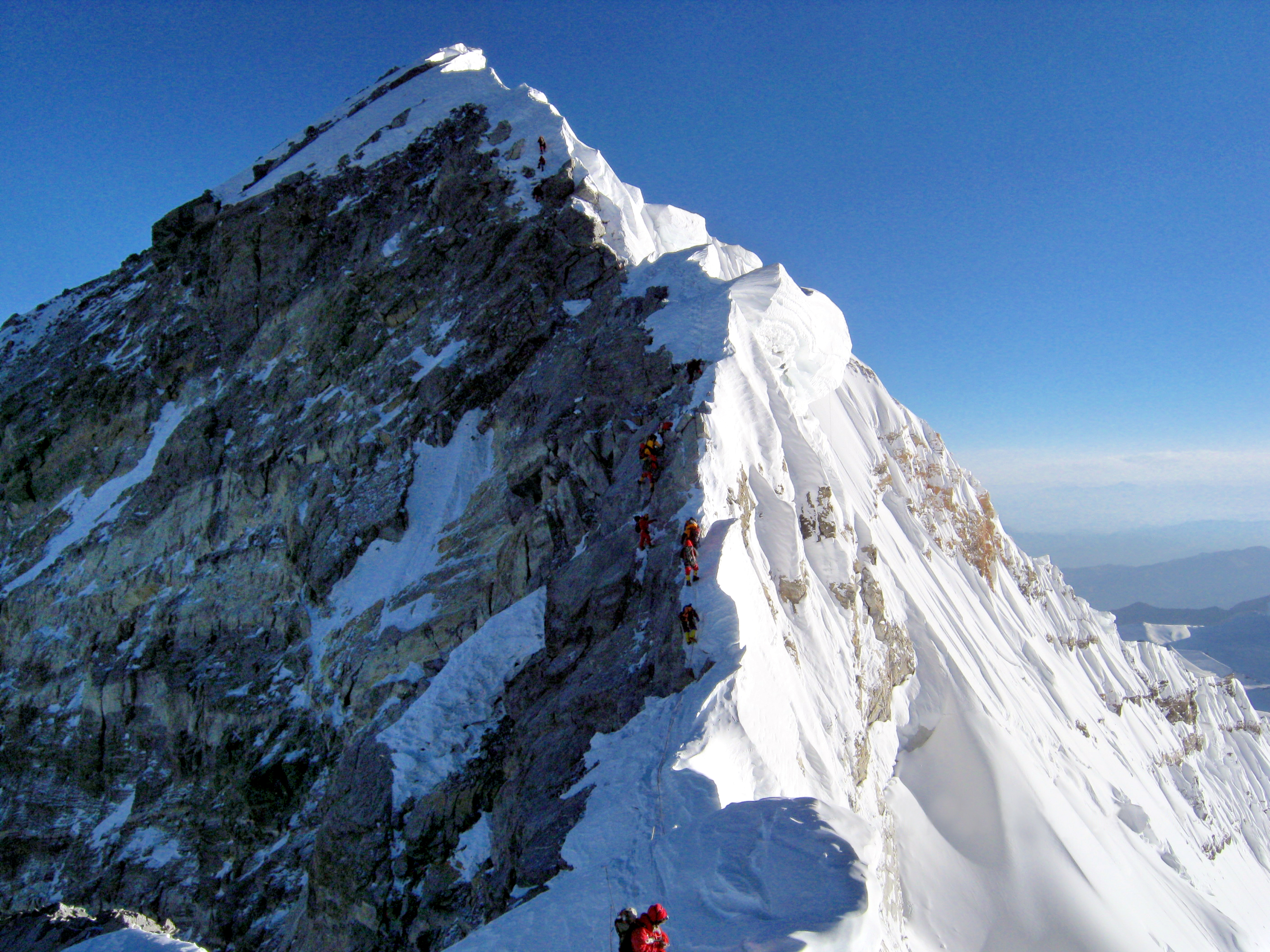
Hillary Step under the Everest Summit, where Szillárd was last found.

In May 2023, Szilárd launched the Kyocera Everest Expedition, in an attempt to solo climb Mount Everest. He was not feeling well before the ascent, struggling with a deep cough and teary eyes. The day before leaving base camp, he wrote in his expedition journal about the attempt: "I'm scared, I'm happy, I'm excited, I'm waiting to get going and I'm waiting for landing: coming home! I can see in front of me the last meters leading to the summit. I can see my little boy running towards me at the airport!"

On May 21, he left base camp for his ascent, with a planned summit of May 24th. His summit attempt, as with his previous summits, was to be done without Sherpas or supplementary oxygen.

At 7:30am on May 24, he was pictured resting at the Balcony (8,400 m), surrounded by oxygen bottles discarded by other climbers. Hours later, climbing teams passed him on their descents, noting that Szilárd was continuing to move slowly to the summit. Hours later, radio contact with Szilárd was lost. On the evening of May 25, word got back to Szilárd's team that a climber was lying unconscious at 8,780 meters, at the base of the Hillary Step. The climbing team found him alive, but suffering from frostbite and high altitude cerebral edema. Based on the information from the team, a helicopter rescue was organized, and Sherpas quickly headed up the mountain to assist the descent.

The next day, after the rescue team could not find Szilárd, the search was called off. The teams spent hours climbing between 8,750 meters where he was last seen and the 8,848-meter summit, but were unable to find any trace of him.

In 2024, Sherpas cleaning Everest planned to bring down bodies from the mountain. Szilárd's wife, mountaineer Tímea Legindi, explicitly asked for his body to remain on the mountain.

After being sighted on the 25th, Szilárd's body has not been seen again.

== Notable ascents ==
8,000m summits without oxygen

- 2014: Broad Peak (8051 m)
- 2019: K2 (8611 m, the first Hungarian to do so)
- 2022: Lhotse (8516 m)

== Sources ==
- Deme Dániel (2023-05-28). "Hopes Crushed in Search for Missing Climber on Mount Everest". HungaryToday.hu.
- Angela Benavides (2023-06-02). "Last Photo: Fellow Climber Captures Final Glimpse of Suhajda Szilard's Everest Journey". ExplorersWeb.com.

== Additional information ==
- Szilárd Suhajda on Facebook
- Alan Arnette (2023-05-25). "Everest 2023: Yet Another Death, Missing Not Found – Update Szilard Found. 2023 Deaths. Nepal RECORD Permit Update as of May 14, 2023". AlanArnette.com/blog.
- Dean (Nick) (2023-05-26). "Everest 2023. Szilard latest victim of Everest". EverestMountain.co.uk.
- Stefan Nestler (2023-05-27). "Mount Everest: Suche nach Szilard Suhajda gestoppt / Search for Szilard Suhajda abandoned". Abenteuer-Berg.de (in German and English).
