= Magdaléna Štrompachová =

Hungarian-Slovak painter (1919–1988)

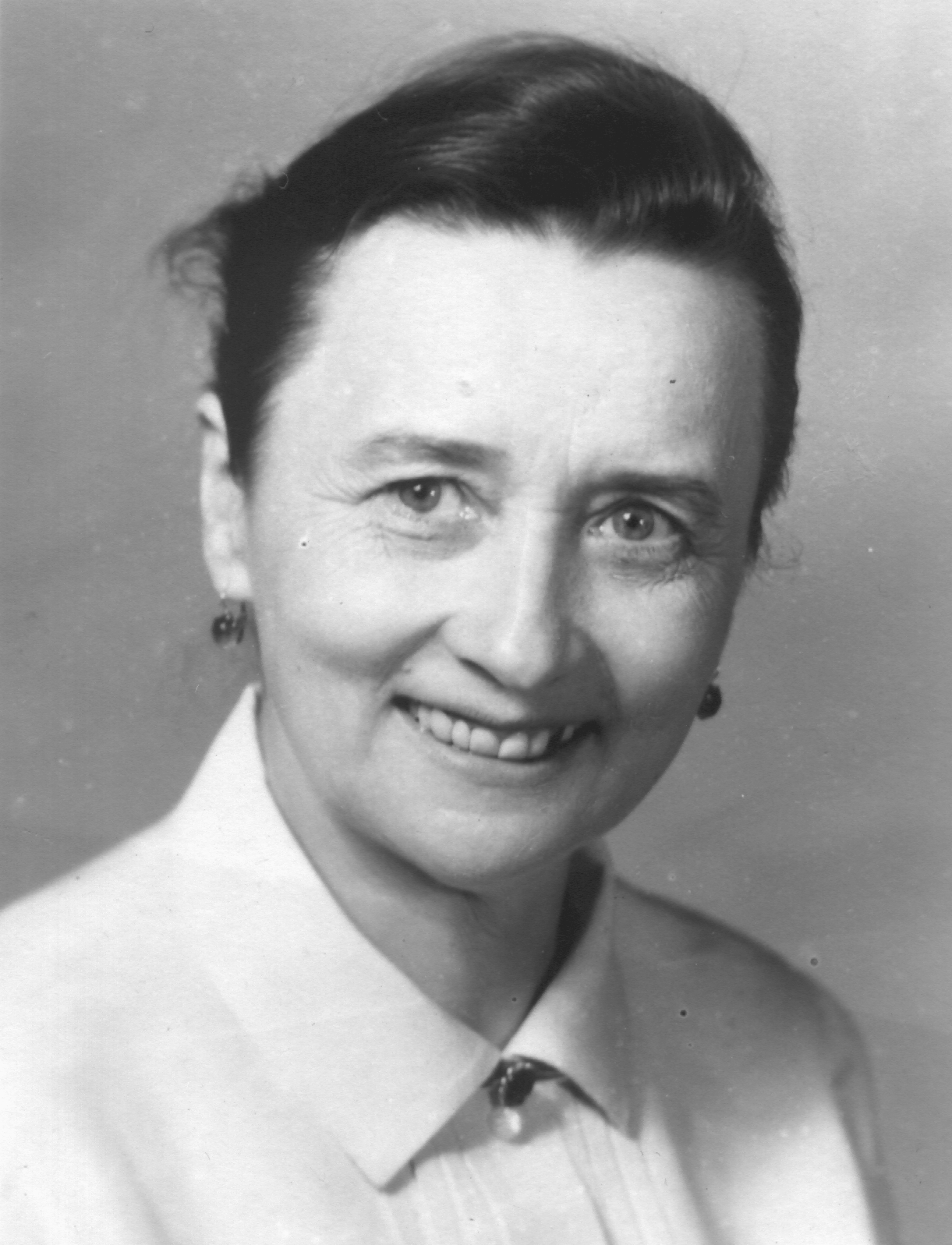
- Magdalena Strompach
- Born: Magdolna Drescher; 23 September 1919; Budapest, Hungary
- Died: 17 November 1988 (aged 69); Bratislava, Slovakia
- Known for: Painting
- Spouse: Ludwig Strompach

Magdaléna Štrompachová (Slovak pronunciation: [ˈmaɡdaleːna ˈʂtrɔmpaxɔʋaː]; née Magdolna Drescher; 23 September 1919 in Budapest – 17 November 1988 in Bratislava) was a Hungarian-Slovak painter and restorer. She founded a fine arts school with her husband Ludwig Strompach where she was a teacher (1964–1973). She received several awards for her artistic and pedagogical work over the course of her career. Many artists followed her classes, her children were among them. Her works are held in Slovakia, Hungary, Austria, and Germany.

== Life ==
Magdaléna Štrompachová grew up in Baja. Her mother was an amateur pianist and her father was a violin teacher and player.

She studied at the Hungarian University of Fine Arts. In 1946, she moved to Prague with her husband, where she worked in a cinema studio, and in 1950 to Slovakia. While in Czechoslovakia, she worked as one of the early animators at the Krátký film Praha (Short Film Prague) studio, contributing character and puppet designs for fairy-tale animated films. From 1986 on, she lived between Budapest and Bratislava.
