= Éva Farkas =

Hungarian artist (born 1960)

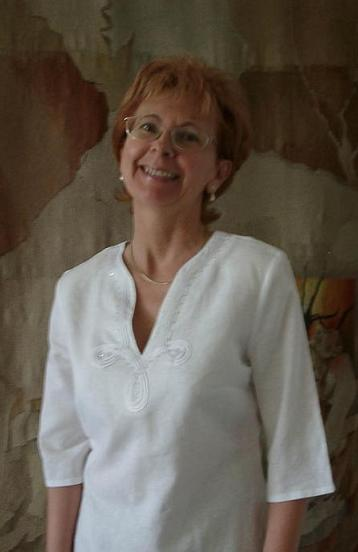
- Born: 15 March 1960 (age 65); Nagykanizsa, Hungary
- Education: Hungarian University of Applied Arts
- Known for: tapestry, graphics

Éva Farkas (born 15 March 1960 in Nagykanizsa) is a Hungarian tapestry artist.

== Biography ==
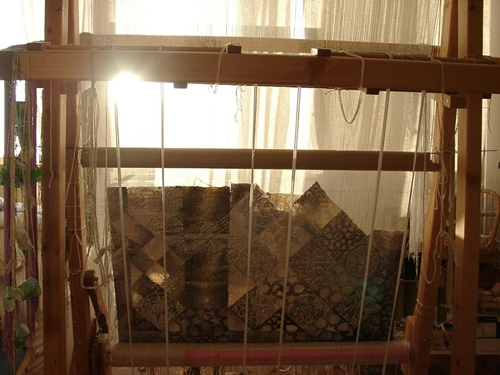
Transcendental light by Éva Farkas

Éva Farkas was born 15 March 1960, in Nagykanizsa. She graduated from the Technical College of Art in Pécs in 1978, where her Arts teacher was the painter Valkó László, her Textile teacher was Bizséné Kovács Diana. She graduated from the Hungarian University of Applied Arts as a tapestry artist in 1984. Her Masters: Kádár János Miklós, Szabó János, Plesnivy Károly, Szilvitzky Margit and Polgár Csaba.

Since 1984 she is a member of the National Association of Hungarian Creative Artists (Magyar Alkotóművészek Országos Egyesülete-MAOE) and also has a membership in the Association of Hungarian Fine and Applied Artists (Magyar Képző- és Iparművészek Szövetsége) since 1991 and the Association of Hungarian Tapestry Artists (Magyar Kárpitművészek Egyesülete) since 1996 /She was one of the designers and weavers of the gobelins "Tapestry Without Limits" and "Saint Stephen And His Work"/. Since its establishment (1998) she is a charter member of the Applied Arts Workshop in Gödöllő, which is the descendant of the famous Gödöllõ Colony of Artists (founded by Aladár Körösfői-Kriesch). The artist often exhibit with other members of the workshop both in Hungary and abroad. She ran a drawing course until 2005 in the Creative House. She give account of her independent artistic activity at individual and grouped exhibitions.

== Personal life ==
She has two children: Nóra (born in 1987) and Zsolt (born in 1990).

== Ars poetica ==
"Throughout the first 16 years of my career, nature was the primary theme of my artwork. My tapestries were prepared with the techniques of classical French gobelins, with dense spacing of the wrap, applying hachure, and delicate transitions of subtle colors. "Castle-Resonance", an exhibition in Gödöllő, inspired me to turn my work to a different artistic direction. The compelling themes of Castle Resonance encouraged me to experiment with unconventional materials providing a new dimension to my artwork. During this period, I completed "Find 2000", a work that inspired a chain of ideas that continued to dominate my future designs. Since then, I remain captivated by the idea of contrasts, particularly, the contrasts between various textures, rustic and fine surfaces, and various materials; the fine and detailed goblin in opposition to sackcloth together on tapestry; silk versus linen; weaving hemp-yarn against gold threads or wool and silk threads simultaneously to create a drastic, yet astonishing effect within each individual piece. While working on this new stylistic effect, I also became interested in thematic elements associated with Eastern cultures and religions, and these novel themes became apparent in my work. Presently, I am mainly focusing on the design of praying-rugs which I named the "Sacred Tapestries". So far, six individual pieces have been completed. They were woven with an interesting and difficult technical approach using wool, linen or silk on every second weft. In my artwork I combine the Eastern and Western culture by incorporating the motives from the oriental rugs. With my "Sacred Tapestries" I would like to send a message that transcends cultural, racial and religious barriers."
