= Ernő Bánk =

Hungarian painter and teacher

Ernő Bánk (1883, Szalmatercs - 1962, Budapest) was a Hungarian painter and teacher noted for his miniature portraits. He was a member of the Association of Hungarian Watercolour and Pastel Painters.

Bánk trained as a secondary school teacher and in 1915 obtained a doctorate in geography and history from Budapest Pázmány Péter University. He also studied painting under Henrik Pap and Béla Sándor at the School of Applied Arts. Between 1914 and 1918 he painted portraits for the 30th Infantry Regiment that were shown at the Museum of Military History. In 1918 and 1919 he worked as secretary for the Civil Radical Party.

He died in 1962. Exhibitions of his work were held in the Hungarian National Gallery in 1978 and in the Budapest Historical Museum in 1984.

== External links and sources ==
- Fine Arts in Hungary
