= List of painters by name beginning with "G" =

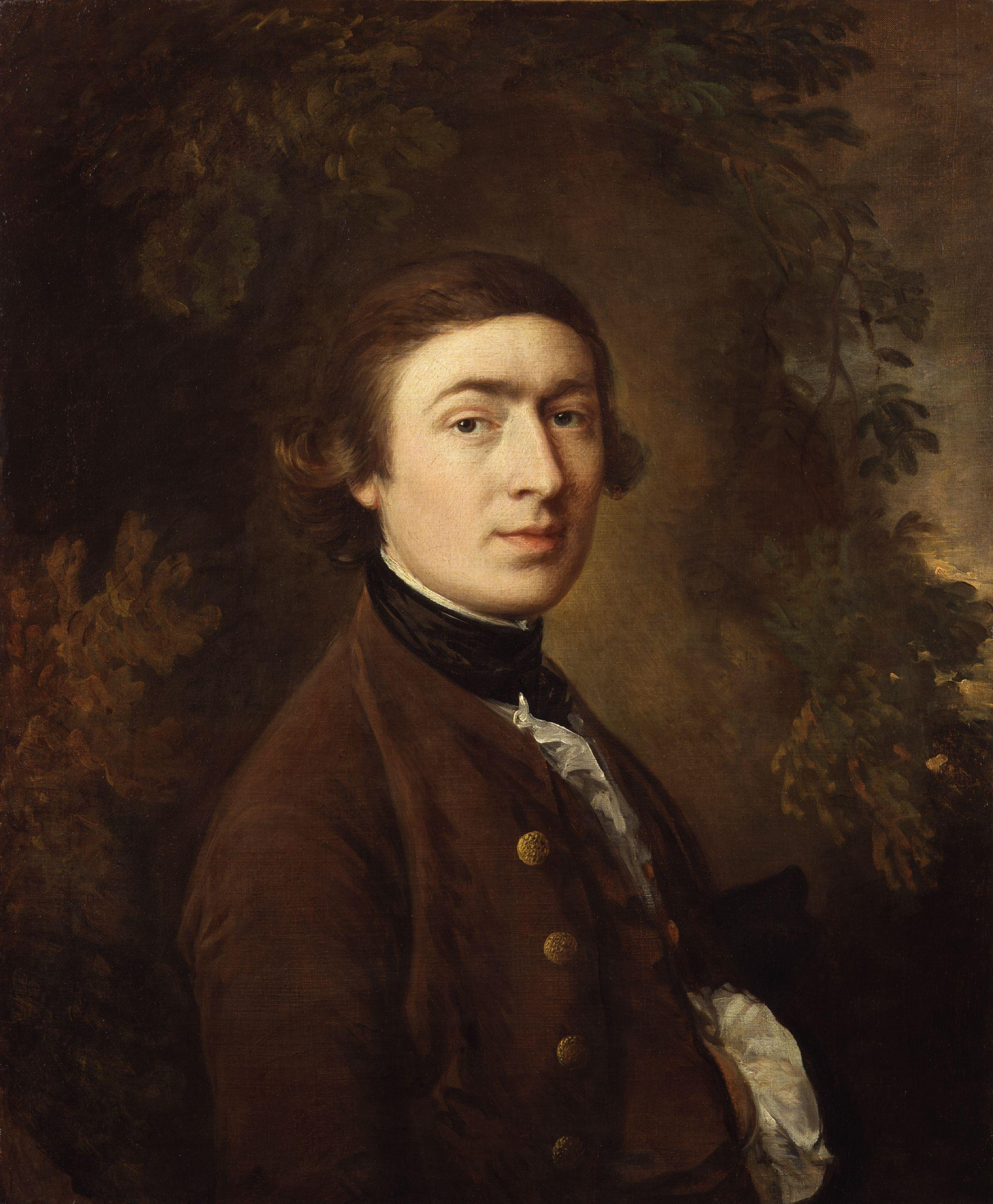
Thomas Gainsborough

Please add names of notable painters with a Wikipedia page, in precise English alphabetical order, using U.S. spelling conventions. Country and regional names refer to where painters worked for long periods, not to personal allegiances.

- Agnolo Gaddi (c. 1350 – 1396), Italian painter
- Taddeo Gaddi (c. 1300 – 1366), Italian painter and architect
- Gai Qi (改琦, 1774–1829), Chinese painter and poet
- Thomas Gainsborough (1727–1788), English painter, draftsman and print-maker
- Tamas Galambos (born 1939), Hungarian painter
- Fede Galizia (1578–1630), Italian painter
- Ellen Gallagher (born 1965), American painter, and film and video-maker
- Akseli Gallen-Kallela (1865–1931), Finnish painter
- Giovanni Antonio Galli (1585 – c. 1651), Italian painter
- Byron Galvez (born 1941), Mexican painter and sculptor
- Lattanzio Gambara (c. 1530 – 1574), Italian painter
- Thomas Gambier Parry (1816–1888), English painter and art collector
- Henry Snell Gamley (1865–1928), Scottish sculptor
- Antonio de la Gandara (1861–1917), French painter, pastel painter and draftsman
- Kishi Ganku (岸駒, 1756–1839), Japanese painter
- Simon Gaon (born 1943), American painter
- Gao Cen (高岑, died 1689), Chinese painter
- Gao Fenghan (高鳳翰, 1683–1749), Chinese painter and poet
- Gao Kegong (髙克恭, 1248–1310), Chinese painter and poet
- Gao Qipei (高其佩, 1660–1734), Chinese artist
- Gao Xiang (高翔, 1688–1753), Chinese painter
- Daniel Garber (1880–1958), American painter
- Víctor Manuel García Valdés (1897–1967), Cuban painter
- Margaret Garland (1893–1976), English painter
- David Garner (born 1958), Welsh installation artist
- Joy Garnett (born 1960), American artist and writer
- Meredith Garniss (born 1967), American visual artist and painter
- Norman Garstin (1847–1926), Irish painter, teacher and critic
- Lee Gatch (1902–1968), American artist
- Gatōken Shunshi (画登軒春芝, fl. 1820–1828), Japanese designer of woodblock prints
- Friedrich Gauermann (1807–1862), Austrian painter
- Jakob Gauermann (1773–1843), German painter and engraver
- Paul Gauguin (1848–1903), French artist
- Giovanni Battista Gaulli (1639–1709), Italian painter
- Robert Gavin (1827–1883), Scottish painter
- Nikolai Ge (1831–1894), Russian painter
- William Gear (1915–1997), Scottish painter
- Andrew Geddes (1783–1844), Scottish/English painter and etcher
- Margaret Geddes (1914–1998), English painter
- Ilka Gedő (1921–1985), Hungarian painter and graphic artist
- Geertgen tot Sint Jans (c. 1460 – c. 1490), Netherlandish painter
- Alison Geissler (1907–2011), Scottish glass engraver
- William Geissler (1894–1963), Scottish artist and wartime cartographer
- Aert de Gelder (1645–1727), Dutch painter
- Justus van Gent (1410–1480), Netherlandish/Italian painter
- Nick Gentry (born 1980), English artist
- Ivan Generalić (1914–1992), Yugoslav/Croatian painter
- Artemisia Gentileschi (1593–1651), Italian painter
- Orazio Gentileschi (1563–1639), Italian painter
- Paul Georges (1923–2002), American painter
- Aleksandr Gerasimov (1881–1963), Russian/Soviet painter
- Fernando Gerassi (1899–1974), Turkish/American artist
- Théodore Géricault (1791–1824), French painter and lithographer
- Abdullah Gërguri (1931–1994), Yugoslav/Kosovar painter and restorer
- Jean-Léon Gérôme (1824–1904), French painter and sculptor
- Kaff Gerrard (1894–1970), English painter and potter
- Wojciech Gerson (1831–1901), Polish painter
- Richard Gerstl (1883–1908), Austrian painter and draftsman
- Mark Gertler (1891–1939), English painter
- Solomon Gessner (1730–1788), Swiss painter, graphic artist and poet
- Cristache Gheorghiu (born 1937), Romanian/Greek painter and writer
- Jacob de Gheyn II (1565–1629), Dutch painter and engraver
- Domenico Ghirlandaio (1449–1494), Italian Renaissance
- Ridolfo Ghirlandaio (1483–1561), Italian painter
- Alberto Giacometti (1901–1966), Swiss sculptor, painter and draftsman
- Diego Giacometti (1902–1985), Swiss sculptor and designer
- Giovanni Giacometti (1868–1933), Swiss painter
- Khalil Gibran (1883–1931), Lebanese/American visual artist and poet
- David Cooke Gibson (1827–1856), Scottish painter and poet
- John Gibson (1790–1866), Welsh/Italian sculptor
- Stefan Gierowski (1925–2022), Polish painter
- Harald Giersing (1881–1927), Danish painter
- Aleksander Gierymski (1850–1901), Polish painter
- Maksymilian Gierymski (1846–1874), Polish watercolor painter
- Sanford Robinson Gifford (1823–1880), American landscape painter
- H. R. Giger (born 1940), Swiss painter
- Araceli Gilbert (1913–1993), Ecuadorian artist
- Stephen Gilbert (1910–2007), Scottish painter and sculptor
- James Giles (1801–1870), Scottish painter
- Colin Gill (1892–1940), English mural and portrait painter
- Gregory Gillespie (1936–2000), American magic realist painter
- James Gillick (born 1972), English painter and applied artist
- William George Gillies (1898–1973), Scottish painter
- Harold Gilman (1945–2000), English painter
- Aleksander Gine (1830–1980), Russian painter
- Phyllis Ginger (1907–2005), English artist and illustrator
- Charles Ginner (1878–1952), English painter
- Giorgione (c. 1477 – 1510), Italian painter
- Giotto (1267–1337), Italian painter and architect
- Frank J. Girardin (1856–1945), American artist and baseball player
- François Girardon (1628–1715), French sculptor
- Marie-Suzanne Giroust (1734–1772), French painter, miniaturist and pastellist
- Fritz Glarner (1899–1972), Swiss/American painter
- Ilya Glazunov (1930–2017), Soviet/Russian artist and academy rector
- Albert Gleizes (1881–1953), French artist and theorist
- Charles Gleyre (1806–1874), French artist and teacher
- Oton Gliha (1914–1999), Yugoslav/Croatian artist
- John William Godward (1861–1922), English painter
- Hugo van der Goes (1440–1482), Flemish painter
- Leo Goetz (1883–1962), German painter
- Vincent van Gogh (1853–1890), Dutch painter
- Elias Goldberg (1886–1978), American painter
- Michael Goldberg (1924–2007) American artist
- Hilde Goldschmidt (1897–1980), German painter and print-maker
- E. William Gollings (1878–1932), American painter
- Leon Golub (1922–2004), American painter
- Hendrik Goltzius (1558–1617), Dutch print-maker, draftsman and painter
- Nuno Gonçalves (fl. 1450–1471), Portuguese court painter
- Natalia Goncharova (1881–1962), Russian/Soviet painter, writer and illustrator
- Gong Kai (龔開, 1222–1307), Chinese painter and government official
- Gong Xian (龔賢, 1618–1689), Chinese painter
- Eva Gonzalès (1849–1883), French painter
- Julio González (sculptor) (1876–1942), Spanish sculptor and painter
- Carl Arnold Gonzenbach (1806–1885), Swiss painter
- Frederick Goodall (1822–1904), English artist
- Robert Goodnough (1917–2010), American painter
- Hilda May Gordon (1874–1972), English watercolor painter
- John Watson Gordon (1788–1864), Scottish painter and Royal Scottish Academy President
- Constance Gordon-Cumming (1837–1924), Scottish painter and travel writer
- Spencer Gore (1878–1914), English painter
- Arshile Gorky (1904–1948) American artist
- Maria Johanna Görtz (1783–1853), Swedish painter
- Jan Gossaert (c. 1478 – 1532), Netherlandish/French painter and draftsman
- Caroline Gotch (1854–1945), English painter
- Adolph Gottlieb (1903–1974) American artist
- Leopold Gottlieb (1879–1934), Polish painter
- Maurycy Gottlieb (1856–1879), Polish painter
- Karl Otto Götz (born 1914), German artist, draftsman and art professor
- Hendrick Goudt (1583–1648), Dutch painter, print-maker and draftsman
- Tom Gourdie (1913–2005), Scottish artist, calligrapher and teacher
- Francisco Josè de Goya (1746–1828), Spanish painter and print-maker
- Jan van Goyen (1596–1656), Dutch landscape painter
- Goyō Hashiguchi (橋口五葉, 1880–1921), Japanese artist
- Igor Grabar (1871–1960), Russian painter, restorer and historian of art
- Anton Graff (1736–1813), Swiss portrait artist
- Peter Benjamin Graham (1925–1987), Australian visual artist, printer, and art theorist
- Eugenio Granell (1912–2001), Spanish artist, musician and writer
- Duncan Grant (1885–1978), Scottish painter and designer
- James Ardern Grant (1887–1973), English painter and print-maker
- Mary Grant (1831–1908), Scottish/English sculptor
- Eugène Grasset (1845–1917), Swiss decorative artist
- Enrique Grau (1920–2004), Colombian artist
- Nancy Graves (1939–1995), American sculptor, painter and print-maker
- Alasdair Gray (1934–2019), Scottish artist and writer
- Cleve Gray (1918–2004), American painter
- Norah Neilson Gray (1882–1931), Scottish painter
- Edmund Greacen (1877–1949), American painter
- Pieter de Grebber (1600–1653), Dutch painter
- El Greco (1541–1614), Greek/Spanish painter, sculptor and architect
- Art Green (born 1941), American artist
- Balcomb Greene (1904–1990), American artist and teacher
- Gertrude Greene (1904–1956), American sculptor and painter
- Stephen Greene (1917–1999), American artist
- Barbara Greg (1900–1983), English painter and illustrator
- Jan Gregoor (1914–1982), Dutch painter and art educator
- Louis Grell (1887–1960), American artist
- HAP Grieshaber (1908–1981), German artist and woodcut maker
- Jan Griffier (1652–1718), Dutch/English painter
- Robert Griffier (1688–1750), English/Dutch painter
- Gwenny Griffiths (1867–1953), Welsh painter
- Samuel Hieronymus Grimm (1733–1794), Swiss landscape artist
- Alexis Grimou (1678–1733), French portrait painter
- John Atkinson Grimshaw (1836–1893), English artist
- Juan Gris (1887–1927), Spanish/French painter
- Giuseppe Grisoni (1699–1796), Italian painter and sculptor
- Konrad Grob (1828–1904), Swiss painter
- Pieter Anthonisz. van Groenewegen (1600–1658), Dutch landscape painter
- Ivan Grohar (1867–1911), Austro-Hungarian (Slovene) painter
- Mary Elizabeth Groom (1903–1958), English print-maker and book illustrator
- Catrin G Grosse (born 1964), German painter, graphic designer and sculptor
- George Grosz (1893–1959), German artist and caricaturist
- Artur Grottger (1837–1867), Polish painter and graphic artist
- Hugo Kārlis Grotuss (1884–1951), Russian/Latvian painter
- Richard Gruelle (1851–1914), American painter, illustrator and author
- Ernő Grünbaum (1908–1944/1945), Hungarian painter, draftsman and Holocaust victim
- Isaac Grünewald (1889–1946), Swedish painter
- Matthias Grünewald (1470–1528), German religious painter
- Eduard von Grützner (1846–1925), German painter and art professor
- Gu An (顧安, 1289–1365), Chinese painter
- Gu Hongzhong (顧閎中, 937–975), Chinese painter
- Gu Kaizhi (顧愷之, 344–406), Chinese painter and politician
- Gu Zhengyi (顧正誼, fl. between 14th and 16th cc.), Chinese painter
- Guan Daosheng (管道昇, 1262–1319) Chinese painter and poet
- Francesco Guardi (1712–1793), Italian painter
- Oswaldo Guayasamín (1919–1999), Ecuadorian painter and sculptor
- Max Gubler (1898–1973), Swiss artist
- Hans Gude (1825–1903), Norwegian painter
- Paul Guigou (1834–1871), French landscape painter
- Albert Guillaume (1873–1942), French painter and caricaturist
- Armand Guillaumin (1841–1927), French painter and lithographer
- Lajos Gulácsy (1882–1932), Hungarian painter
- Genco Gulan (born 1969), Turkish painter and sculptor
- Olaf Gulbransson (1873–1958), Norwegian artist, painter and designer
- Ismail Gulgee (1926–2007), Indian/Pakistani painter
- Herbert James Gunn (1893–1964), Scottish painter
- Guo Chun (郭純, 1370–1444), Chinese painter
- Guo Xi (郭熙, 1020–1090), Chinese landscape painter
- Nazmi Ziya Güran (1881–1937), Turkish painter and art teacher
- Elena Guro (1877–1913), Russian painter and writer
- Alfred Richard Gurrey, Sr. (1852–1944), American landscape painter
- Ella Guru (born 1966), American painter and musician
- Philip Guston (1913–1980), American artist
- Gusukuma Seihō (城間清豊, 1614–1644), Japanese court painter
- Albert Paris Gütersloh (1887–1973), Austro-Hungarian/Austrian painter and writer
- James Guthrie (1859–1930), Scottish painter
- Kathleen Guthrie (1905–1981), English painter
- Robin Guthrie (1902–1971), English painter
- Judith Gutierrez (1927–2003), Ecuadorian/Mexican painter
- Werner Gutzeit (1932–2014), Danish/German painter and designer
- Jenő Gyárfás (1857–1925), Hungarian painter, graphic artist and writer
- Líviusz Gyulai (1937–2021), Romanian (Hungarian) graphic artist, print-maker and illustrator
