= Gao Cen =

Chinese painter

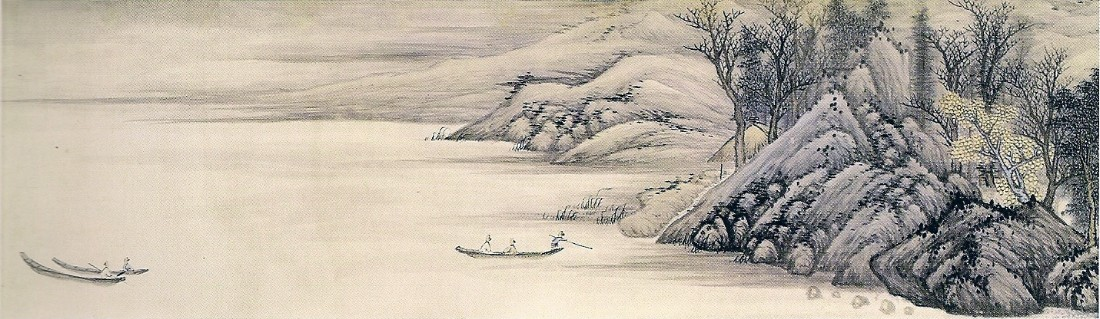
Vision fugitive of the stony city

Gao Cen (Chinese: 高岑), courtesy name as Shanchang or Weisheng, is a famed Chinese painter active during the Qing Dynasty. A native Hangzhou, he lived in Jinling (now Nanjing) and was one of "Eight Masters of Jinling".

== Eight masters of Jinling ==
At the beginning the Qing dynasty was formed by a group of artists, called Eight masters of Jinling (current Nanjing). Junling was the most important city after Beijing. Many loyal supporters gathered for the foundation of Qing. Eight masters de Janling: Gong Xian, Fan Qi, Zou Zhe, Wu Hong, Hu Zao, Gao Cen, Ye Xin and Xie Sun, kept their fidelity mostly to Ming and expressed their feelings in their writings.

== Biography ==
Gao Cen lived for the known part of his life in Nanjing where he was considered as part of «Eight masters of Nanjing» as painter but also poet. He was good at painting flowers and landscapes. Number of his landscapes, as escaped Vision of the stony city, represent surroundings of Jinling.

There wasn't found the method of ink accumulation by Gong Xian; he used rather traditional linear methods. He was gifted for the drawing of outlines and employed job magnificently in the dry brush for the shade. Unlike Gong, most of his writings were accomplished in colour on silk.

== Museums ==
- Beijing (Museum of the imperial palace):
  - Vision fugitive of the stony city, section of a portable roll, inks and colour on silk, 36,3x701,8 cm
- Berlin
  - Paintings of landscapes, dated from 1672, ink and colours on paper, album of twelve canvases according to the masters Song and Yuan, inscription of the painter on the last canvas.

== Bibliography ==
- Xin, Yang; Chongzheng, Nie; Shaojun, Lang; Barnhart, Charles M.; Cahill, James; Hung, Wu (1997). Trois mille ans de peinture chinoise (in French). Arles: P. Picquier. ISBN 2-87730-341-1. OCLC 38586239.
- Busse, Jacques; Bénézit, E. (1999). Dictionnaire critique et documentaire des peintres, sculpteurs, dessinateurs et graveurs de tous les temps et de tous les pays (in French). Paris: Gründ. ISBN 2-7000-3010-9. OCLC 48989344.
