= Kou Baimen =

Chinese courtesan

- 寇白門
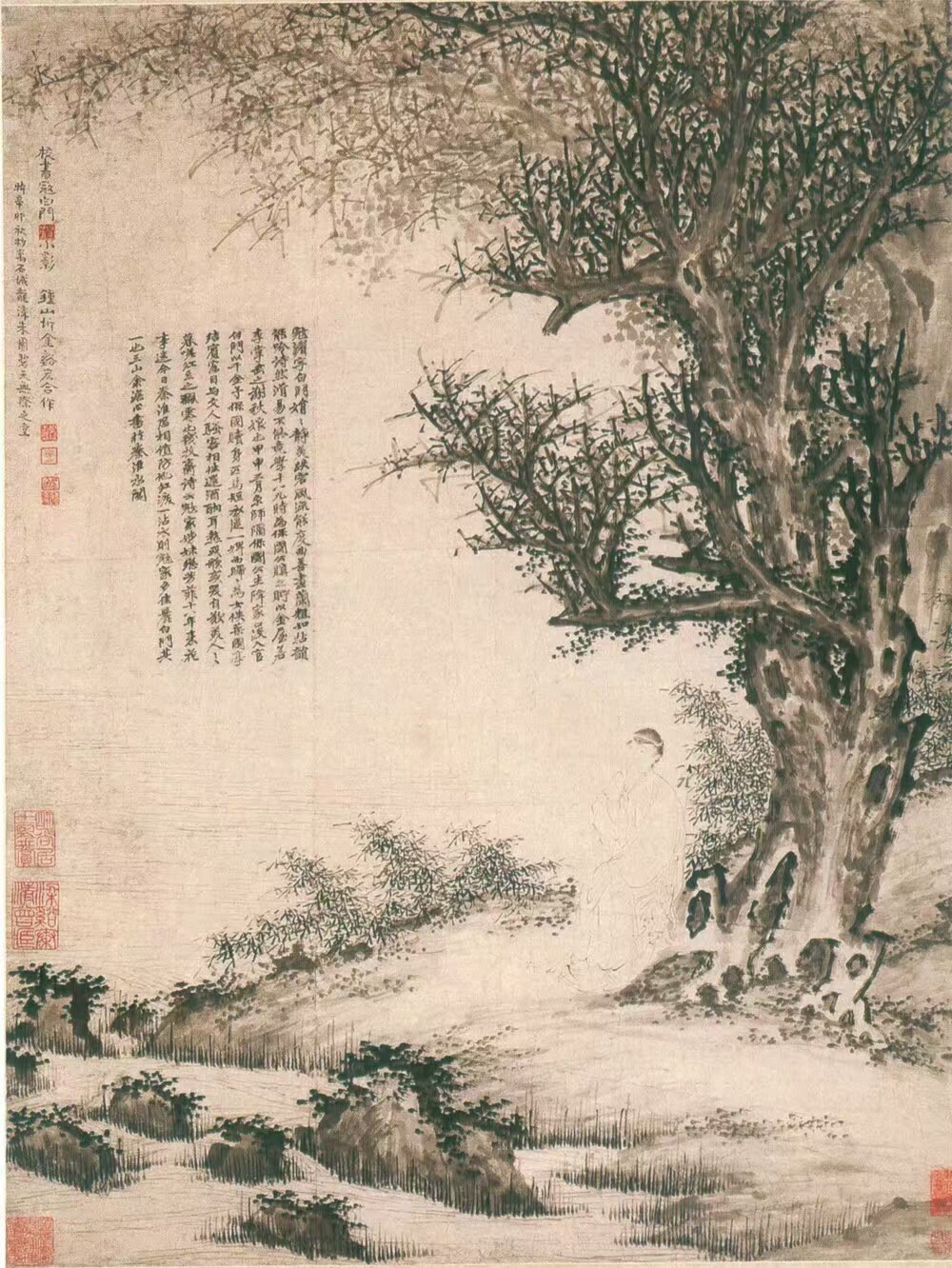
- "The Portrait of Kou Baimen" drawn in 1651 by Fan Qi (樊圻) and Wu Hong (吳宏) during the Ming Dynasty, as displayed in the Nanjing Museum
- Born: Kou Mei (寇湄) c. 1624; Qinhuai, Nanjing
- Occupation: Courtesan
- Era: Ming-Qing transition period
- Known for: Eight Beauties of Qinhuai
- Spouse: Zhu Guobi

Kou Baimen (寇白門, born 1624) was a Chinese courtesan, poet, and one of the Eight Beauties of Qinhuai (Chinese: 秦淮八艳) during the Ming-Qing transition period.

== Biography ==
Kou Baimen was born Kou Mei (寇湄) in 1624. She lived in Qinhuai District of Nanjing, and was officially registered as a courtesan with the Southern Entertainment Bureau, the official government agency responsible for training and management of courtesans in China. At 18 or 19, her indenture was bought out by a high-ranking official Zhu Guobi (朱國弼), and she became his concubine. They married in a lavish ceremony with 5,000 soldiers lining the route from Wudong Bridge to Zhu's home at Nei Bridge.

When the Ming dynasty was overthrown and Nanjing fell to the Machus in 1644, Zhu, having lost everything, decided to sell Baimen. Instead, she convinced him that releasing her was more profitable. She returned to Qinhuai to resume working as a courtesan, and was able to send 10,000 pieces of gold to Zhu within a month. However, in his book Banqiao zaji (板橋雜記 or Miscellaneous Records of the Wooden Bridge), Yu Huai (余懷) shared a different version of events. According to him, in the third month of jiashen, after the capital fell, all of Zhu's properties were confiscated and Baimen gave him 1,000 pieces of gold in exchange for her release. She followed a maid on a horseback to Qinhuai, and became a nüxia (transl. female knight-errant), building gardens, entertaining friends, and regularly consorting with poets and artists. Although the appellate of nüxia or xianu in fiction and drama is meant to convey the subject's adeptness in martial arts and feats of vengeance, in this instance, the term "connotes unconventional behavior, courage, generosity, resoluteness, andindependence of spirit." There's also an "implication of male attributes and transcendence of gender boundaries in the appellation." Poet-historian Qian Qianyi also described Baimen as nüxia for "taking her destiny into her own hands and freely expressing her independence of spirit."

Baimen hosted the poet Fang Wen(方文) in 1655 and he wrote 3 poems for her. She was also painted by several artists of the time, including Fan Qi and Wu Hong.

== Bibliography ==
- Cahill, James. "Women In Chinese Paintings: Courtesans, Concubines, and Willing Women". jamescahill.info.
- Dai, Lianbin (April 2004). Li Mingrui's private troupe and its spectators (1644-62) (Thesis). University of British Columbia, Canada.
