= Ernő Tibor =

Hungarian painter

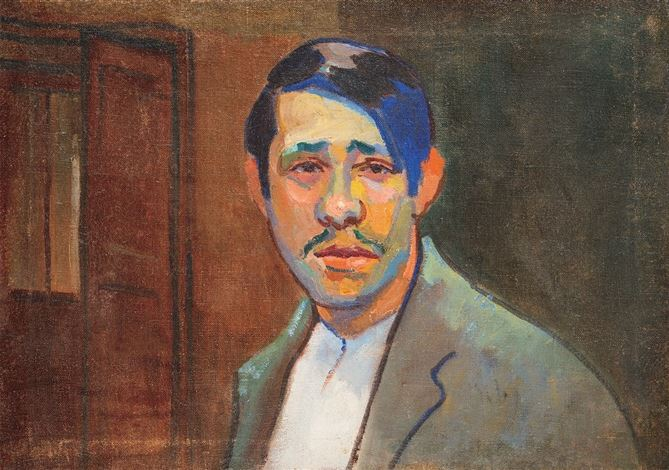
- Self-portrait (c.1907)
- Born: 28 February 1885; Nagyvárad, Austria-Hungary (now Oradea, Romania)
- Died: 1945; Dachau, Germany

Ernő Tibor, originally Fischer (28 February 1885 – early 1945) was a Hungarian Impressionist and Neo-Impressionist painter of Jewish ancestry. He was murdered in the Holocaust.

== Biography ==
From 1904 to 1905 he studied at the Academy of Fine Arts in Budapest with Tivadar Zemplényi. It was there he became interested in painting scenes from everyday life. He could not, however, tolerate the conservative approach taken by the Academy so, thanks to a scholarship from the city government of Nagyvárad (today Oradea, Romania), he went to Paris to study at the Académie Julian. While there, he worked with Jean-Paul Laurens, who encouraged him to paint portraits; notably of the poets Endre Ady and Ákos Dutka, an old friend from school.

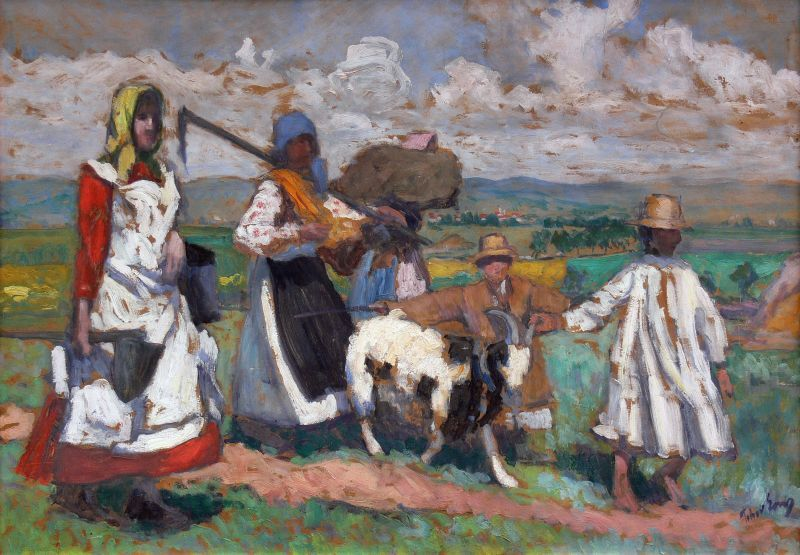
Peasants with Goat

After returning from Paris, he held his first solo exhibition in Oradea and was married shortly thereafter. From 1912 to 1914, he exhibited in Stockholm, Gothenburg, Copenhagen and several cities in Germany, but he always made Nagyvárad his center of activity. During this time, he also helped organize an art and literature society called "Holnap" (Tomorrow). He was often referred to as the "painter of Nagyvárad".

His career was interrupted by service in World War I, although he sketched while at the front. Afterward, he began to organize exhibits, including a major showing of local artists in Bucharest. He would continue to exhibit there at the Official Salon. Later in the 1920s, he made lengthy visits to Italy and France (notably Brittany). In 1935, with financial support from Oradea, he travelled the Black Sea coast from Balchik to the Soviet border and expanded his palette of colors.

Following the establishment of the Fascist régime in 1940, persecution by the Iron Guard prevented him from participating in public events in Romania, although he was able to quietly contribute to some as late as 1942. After that, he unsuccessfully tried to exhibit at the Budapest Salon. In the aftermath of Operation Margarethe, an effort was made to "cleanse" the Hungarian-speaking areas of Jews. In May 1944 he was transported to the concentration camp at Auschwitz then transferred to a forced-labor group at Dachau. He was murdered there early the next year, not long before the camp was liberated.

In 1990, an art society and gallery bearing his name was established in one of Oradea's historic buildings. In January 1992 a large retrospective of local Jewish painters was held at the Muzeul Țării Crișurilor in Oradea. The exhibition was called "Light and Spirit" and included Tibor's works together with those of Alex Leon, Ernő Grünbaum and Móric Barát (1880-1944).

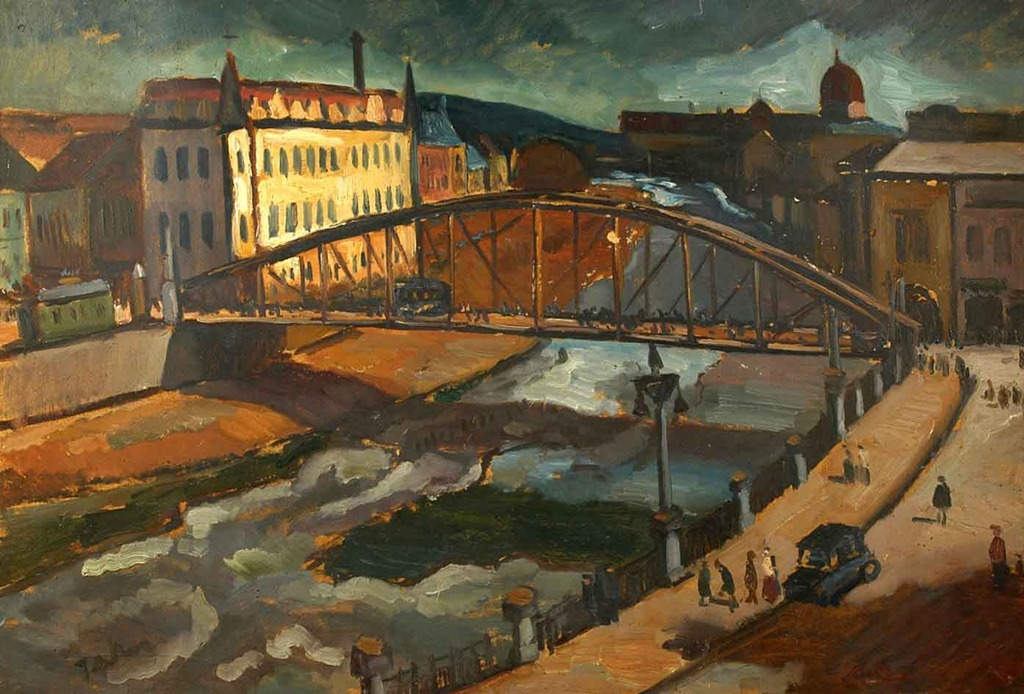
View of Oradea (Nagyvárad)
