= Földes (surname) =

Földes is a surname of Hungarian origin. People with this surname include:

- Andor Földes (1913 – 1992), Jewish Hungarian pianist
- Dezső Földes (1880 – 1950), Hungarian fencer
- Eniko Földes (born 1944), Hungarian chemist
- Éva Földes (1914 – 1981), Hungarian author
- Ferenc Földes, namesake of the Ferenc Földes Secondary School, Hungary
- Imre Földes (1881-1948?), Hungarian graphic artist, painter, book designer, poster artist and engraver.
- Imre Földes (writer) (1881–1958), Hungarian playwright and librettist
- Jolán Földes (1902 – 1963), Hungarian author
- László Földes (born 1959), Hungarian architect
- Mária Földes (1925 – 1976), Jewish Romanian-Hungarian playwright
- Sebastian Földes (born 1976), Swedish Lawyer
- Vilmos Földes (born 1984), Hungarian pocket billiards player

== Foldes ==
- Lawrence D. Foldes, director and producer
- Peter Foldes (1924 – 1977), Hungarian-British director and animator
- Pierre Foldès (born 1951), French surgeon of Hungarian origin
- Yolanda Foldes (1902–1963), Hungarian novelist
