= Seihō =

- Gender: Male

Origin
- Origin: Japanese
- Meaning: Different meanings depending on the kanji used

Seihō, Seiho or Seihou (written: 勢朋, 清豊 or 栖鳳) is a masculine Japanese given name. Notable people with the name include:

- Gusukuma Seihō (城間 清豊) (1614–1644), Japanese court painter
- Ryūko Seihō (龍虎 勢朋) (1941–2014), Japanese sumo wrestler and actor
- Takeuchi Seihō (竹内 栖鳳) (1864–1942), Japanese painter
