= Ernő Grünbaum =

Hungarian artist

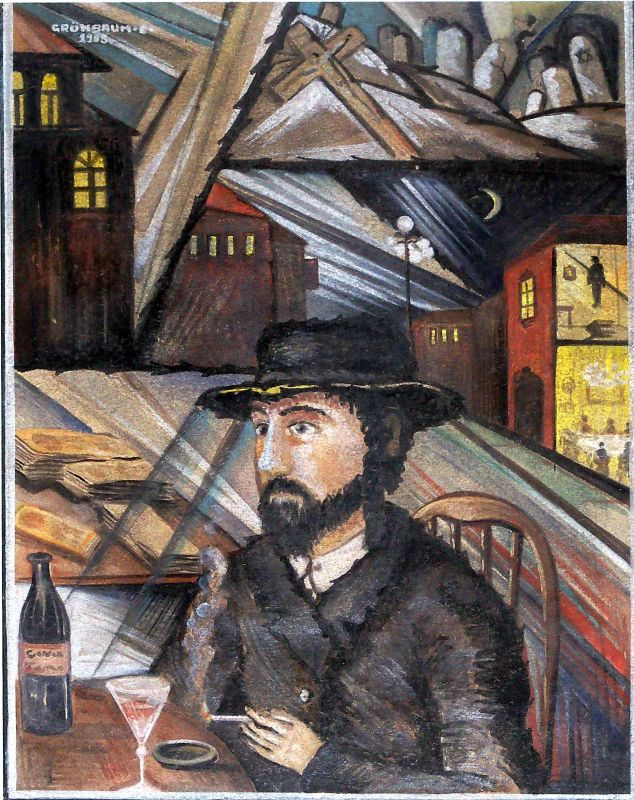
- Self-portrait (1933/36)
- Born: 21 May 1908; Nagyvárad, Austria-Hungary
- Died: 1944/45; Mauthausen, Nazi Germany
- Known for: Painting
- Movement: Modernism

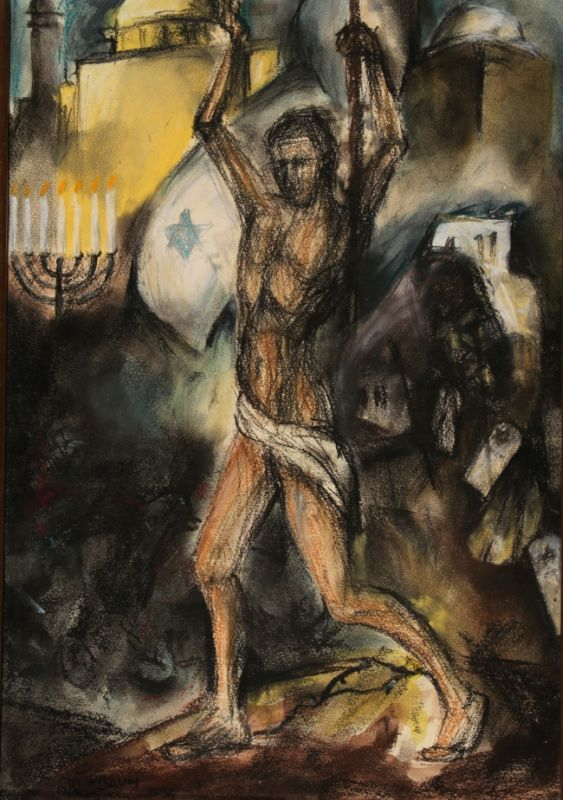
Jesus Before the Synagogue

Ernő Grünbaum (29 March 1908 in Nagyvárad – between December 1944 and April 1945 in Mauthausen) was a Hungarian painter, graphic artist, lithographer and illustrator. He worked in a variety of styles, including Art Nouveau, Expressionism and Cubism.

== Biography ==
His father's death left the family in severe financial distress and he was unable to take art lessons, although he displayed considerable talent for drawing. Initially he worked as a tanner, then as a carpenter. This was followed by an apprenticeship to a copper engraver. In 1927, he found employment with the Sonnenfeld publishing company, where he learned typography. While there, he met and befriended Alex Leon, an Expressionist graphic artist who introduced him to the trends in modern art.

His first exhibition was at the Journalists' Club in his home town. Shortly after, he participated in creating the "Association of Fine Arts". In 1933, he participated in a major exhibition of young artists at a hotel called the Weiszlovits Palace, together with his friend Leon, Imre Földes, Imre Ványai and others. His first solo exhibition came in March 1936. Over the next few years, he advertised in Budapest as a draftsman and lithographer. In addition to his paintings, he designed the covers and title pages for several books.

In May 1944, he and his colleague, Jenő Elefánt were transported to Mauthausen Concentration Camp. He was murdered there sometime between then and the camp's liberation by the United States Army a year later. The exact number of works he created is unknown, but it is believed that the great majority of them were destroyed during the war.

In January 1992, a large retrospective of local Jewish painters was held at the Muzeul Țării Crișurilor in Oradea (Nagyvárad). The exhibition was called "Light and Spirit" and included Grünbaum's works together with those of Leon, Ernő Tibor and Móric Barát.
