= Fan Qi =

Fan Qi is the pinyin romanization of various Chinese names.

It may refer to:

- Fan Qi (official) (范齊; fl. 2nd century BC), an official for the state of Yan in the early Han dynasty
- Fan Qi (artist)
- Fan Qi (referee)
- Ky Fan, a mathematician
