= Gutzeit =

Gutzeit is a German and Yiddish surname. It may be transliterated from Russian as Guttsayt (Russian: Гутцайт). Notable people with the surname include:

- Bruno Gutzeit (born 1966), French swimmer
- Hans Gutzeit (1836–1919), Norwegian merchant and industrialist
- Konstanze von Gutzeit (born 1985), German cellist
- Lore Maria Peschel-Gutzeit (1932–2023), German judge and politician
- Siegmar Gutzeit (born 1952), German fencer
- Tilo Gutzeit (born 1938), German figure skater
- Vadym Gutzeit (born 1971), Ukrainian Olympic champion sabre fencer and Ukraine's Youth and Sport Minister
- Werner Gutzeit (1932–2014), German-Danish cubist painter

== See also ==
- de:Guttzeit
