= Cristache Gheorghiu =

Romanian writer, painter, mechanical engineer and computer scientist

Cristache Gheorghiu (Romanian pronunciation: [krisˈtake ɡe̯orˈɡi.u]; born May 2, 1937) is a Romanian writer, painter, mechanical engineer and computer scientist.

In literature, Gheorghiu is best known as an essayist. An engineer by profession, he is known for his research on cybernetics. In the latter part of his life Gheorghiu has devoted himself to literature and art.

== Biography ==
Gheorghiu was born in Roman, Romania, the son of Victor and Aurora Gheorghiu (born Vintilă). Victor Gheorghiu was an officer in the Romanian army who died in 1941 during the invasion of the Soviet Union in Odessa.

Cristache Gheorghiu attended the Lyceum Roman Voda, in Roman. He graduated from Gheorghe Asachi Technical University in 1959, with a master's degree in engineering. Gheorghiu worked as a mechanical engineer in Romanian enterprises and as a master designer in the County Institute of Design “Prahova”.In 1970, Gheorghiu switched his profession to computer science, as a result of attending the courses organised by C.I.I. France, from which Romania has bought the license for producing electronic computers.

Gheorghiu has published numerous scientific research articles. The main theme of his researches was "Territorial Information System". As recognition of his contribution, his name is mentioned in "The history of Science in Romania", the chapter "Cybernetics", and two of his scientific works has been selected in "Study of the Romanian Contribution in the Development of Cybernetics", (Publishing House of the Romanian Academy, 1981). He was one of the pioneers of Romanian computer science. He is the creator of the "Principle of informational remanence", based on which he built a set of computer programs for the analysis of social-economic relations between localities and the simulation of the future evolution of such networks.

Gheorghiu has had numerous personal exhibitions and there are his paintings in many private collections or decorating public spaces. In literature he is known particularly as an essayist, his books – novels, travel notes or essays as it – always having deeper connotations than the apparent form the wording. He created and maintained the electronic publication "ADVERSA RES – a magazine of cultural confluences", where he used to comment the main cultural events from Brasov, where he moved in 1972. After retirement, he settled in Athens, Greece.

== Books ==
- U.S.A. '95, (in Romanian)
- Singur printre americani (in Romanian)
- America After America (in English)
- Intre doua idealuri (in Romanian)
- Traditie sau liberul arbitru? (in Romanian)
- Where Is My Way? (in English)
- Remanente informatice (Scientific researches, in Romanian )
- Memoriile unui catel adult (in Romanian)
- asFORisme - un fel de cugetari (in Romanian)
- asFORisme - A Kind of Thoughts
- Filosofia unui bolovan (in Romanian)
- Grecia - note de calatorie (in Romanian)
- America after America, JustFiction Edition, Germany, 2012, (in English)
- Scrisori din Atena, Editura Pastel, 2012 (in Romanian)
- A Boulder’s Philosophy, Bibliotastic, New York, 2012, (in English)
- With Love from Athens, 2012, (in English)
- Anastasia, 2013, (in Romanian)
- Anastasia, 2013, (in English)
- asFORisme 2 - A Kind of Thoughts, 2013,
- asFORisme 2 - Un fel de cugetari, 2013, (in Romanian)
- Eseuri vesele si triste, 2014, (in Romanian)
- Cautari, 2014, (in Romanian)
- Dictionar roman-grec de verbe pentru incepatori, 2015, (in Romanian)
- Dupa 50 de ani, 2015, (in Romanian)
- Memoria timpului pierdut, 2016, (in Romanian)
- asFORisme 3 - Un fel de cugetari, 2016, (in Romanian)
- asFORisme 3 - A Kind of Thoughts, 2016
- Filosofia unui bolovan, volumul 2, 2018, (in Romanian)
- Maieutica de buzunar, 2019, (in Romanian)

== Scientific works in Romanian ==
- Sistem expert în cobalto-terapia tumorilor maligne - Academia RSR, al IV-lea „Colocviu de Sisteme şi Cibernetică”, București 19–20 octombrie 1987
- Cibernetica evoluţiei sistemelor socio-teritoriale – Academia R.S.R., al 3-lea Congres Naţional de Cibernetică, București 1985,
- Modelarea asistată de calculator an evoluţiei sistemelor socio-teritoriale – Academia R.S.R., Academia de StudiiEconomice, a III-a Conferinţă Naţională de Cibernetică, 3-4 octombrie 1985
- Modelarea unor probleme ale conducerii teritoriale - Institutul Central de Informatică, Sesiunea de comunicăriŞtiinţifice 29-31 octombrie 1984
- Principiul remanenţei informaţionale applicat la conducerea sistemelor economice mari - Institutul Central de Informatică, Sesiunea de comunicări ştiinţifice I.C.I. 1981
- Modelarea şi simularea numerică an evoluţiei sistemelor economico-sociale - Institutul Central de Informatică, Raportde cercetare, 1980
- Încercări de simulare numerică a sistemelor economico-sociale – Institutul Central de Informatică, Sesiune jubiliară de comunicări ştiinţifice, 22-24 septembrie 1980
- Simularea evoluţiei indicatorilor economico-sociali ai localităţilor dintr-un judeţ - Institutul Central de Informatică, Raport de cercetare, noiembrie 1982, în cadrul temei de cercetare: „Sistem Informatic Teritorial”.
- Asupra problemei de classificare automată – Institutul Central de Informatică, Sesiunea de Comunicări Ştiinţifice, 24-26 mai 1982
- Dinamica indicatorilor - Institutul Central de Informatică, consfătuire de lucru, Craiova 26-27 noiembrie 1981
- Metode statistico-matematice folosite în analiza stării de sănătate a copiilor - În colaborare cu dr. Vasile Moldovan, a VIII-a Sesiune de Creaţie Ştiinţifică şi Tehnică, Braşov 1979
- Tabloul de bord al conducătorului în profil territorial - a VIII-a Sesiune de Creaţie Ştiinţifică şi Tehnică, Braşov 1979
- Dinamica indicatorilor - Al IV-lea Simpozion „Informatică şi conducere”, Cluj-Napoca 10-13 mai 1978
- Despre câteva principii antientropice în evoluţia sistemelor de producţie – Universitatea Braşov, Sesiunea ştiinţifică a cadrelor didactice a Universităţii Braşov, 15-17 februarie 1974
- Simularea fabricaţiei cu aplicaţii în programarea producţiei - Universitatea Craiova, Sesiunea de comunicări ştiinţifice 24-25 noiembrie 1973
- Algorithm şi program pentru rezolvarea matricelor simetrice puternic diagonale (criteriul Witmayer) - Studiu effectuat pentru Direcţia pentru Sistematizarea, Arhitectura şi Proiectarea Construcţiilor, judeţul Prahova, 1970

== Published works ==
- Cibernetica evoluţiei sistemelor socio-teritoriale – comunicare ştiinţifică selectată în cartea „CIBERNETICA”, Editura Academiei, 1988
- Sistem expert în cobalto-terapia tumorilor maligne - Academia RSR, Rezumatele comunicărilor celui de al IV-lea„Colocviu de Sisteme şi Cibernetică”, București 19-20 octombrie 1987
- Principiul remanenţei informaţionale applicat la conducerea sistemelor economice mari - Revista de Statistică nr. 8 –August 1981
- Modelarea şi simularea numerică an evoluţiei sistemelor sociale, Raport de cercetare - Institutul Central de Informatică,1980
- Modelarea şi simularea numerică an evoluţiei sistemelor economico-sociale, un punct de vedere - Buletinul Român de Informatică, I.C.I. București, nr. 6/1980
- Analiza evoluţiei principalilor indicatori economici la un set de întreprinderi - Buletinul Informatic al Casei de Ştiinţă şi Tehnică pentru Tineret, Braşov, 1980
- Tablou de bord pentru conducerea activităţilor economice în profil territorial – Produse informatice S.I.T., Institutul Central de Informatică, 1980
- Dinamica Indicatorilor – „Actualitatea în informatică şi conducere”, Cluj-Napoca, 1979
- soluţie pentru programarea producţiei - Revista Economică nr. 14 din septembrie 1974
- Programarea producţiei după o metodă dinamică – „Studii şi Cercetări de Calcul Economic şi Cibernetică Economică”, Academia de Studii Economice, București 1/1974
