= Eight Masters of Nanjing =

The Eight Masters of Nanjing (Chinese: 南京八家; pinyin: Nánjīng Bā Jiā) or Eight Masters of Jinling (Chinese: 金陵八家; pinyin: Jīnlíng Bā Jiā) were a group of 17th century Chinese painters living in Nanjing who were leaders of the Nanjing school. The most prominent of them was Gong Xian. The Eight Masters of Nanjing were:

- Gong Xian (ca. 1618–1689)
- Fan Qi (1615–1616-ca. 1694)
- Ye Xin (fl. 1650-1670s)
- Zou Zhe (1636-ca. 1708)
- Gao Cen (fl. 1670s; d. 1689)
- Hu Zao (fl. 1681)
- Wu Hong (fl. 1670s-1680s)
- Xie Sun (fl. 1679)

== Name ==
"Jinling" was a former name of the city of Nanjing. In Chinese, the terms 金陵八家 and 南京八家 are both used, though the former ("Eight Masters of Jinling") is more frequently used than the latter ("Eight Masters of Nanjing"). In English, on the other hand, the term "Eight Masters of Nanjing" is more frequently used than the term "Eight Masters of Jinling".
