= Hu Zao =

Hu Zao (Wade Giles: Hu Tsao, traditional: 胡慥, simplified: 胡慥, pinyin: Hú Zào); was a Chinese landscape painter during the Qing Dynasty (1644–1912), one of the Eight Masters of Nanjing. His specific years of birth and death are not known.

Hu was born in the Jiangsu province. His style name was 'Shigong'. Hu painted landscapes and human figures, and specialized in sketching chrysanthemums.
