= Ye Xin =

Yè Xīn (simplified Chinese: 叶欣; traditional Chinese: 葉欣; Wade–Giles: Yeh Hsin) was a Chinese landscape painter during the Qing dynasty (1644–1912), one of the Eight Masters of Nanjing. His specific years of birth and death are not known.

Ye was born in Huating in Jiangsu province, and later moved to Nanjing. His courtesy name was Rongmu.
