= Andor Földes =

Hungarian-American pianist

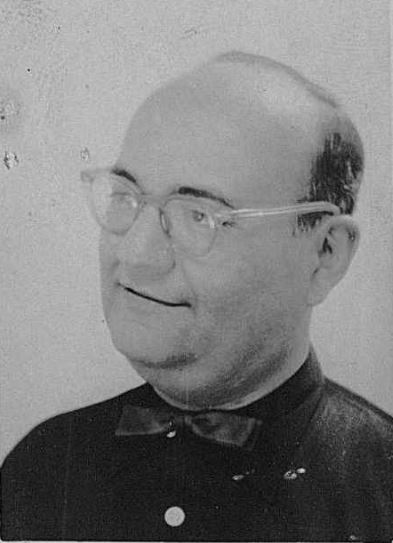
Andor Földes

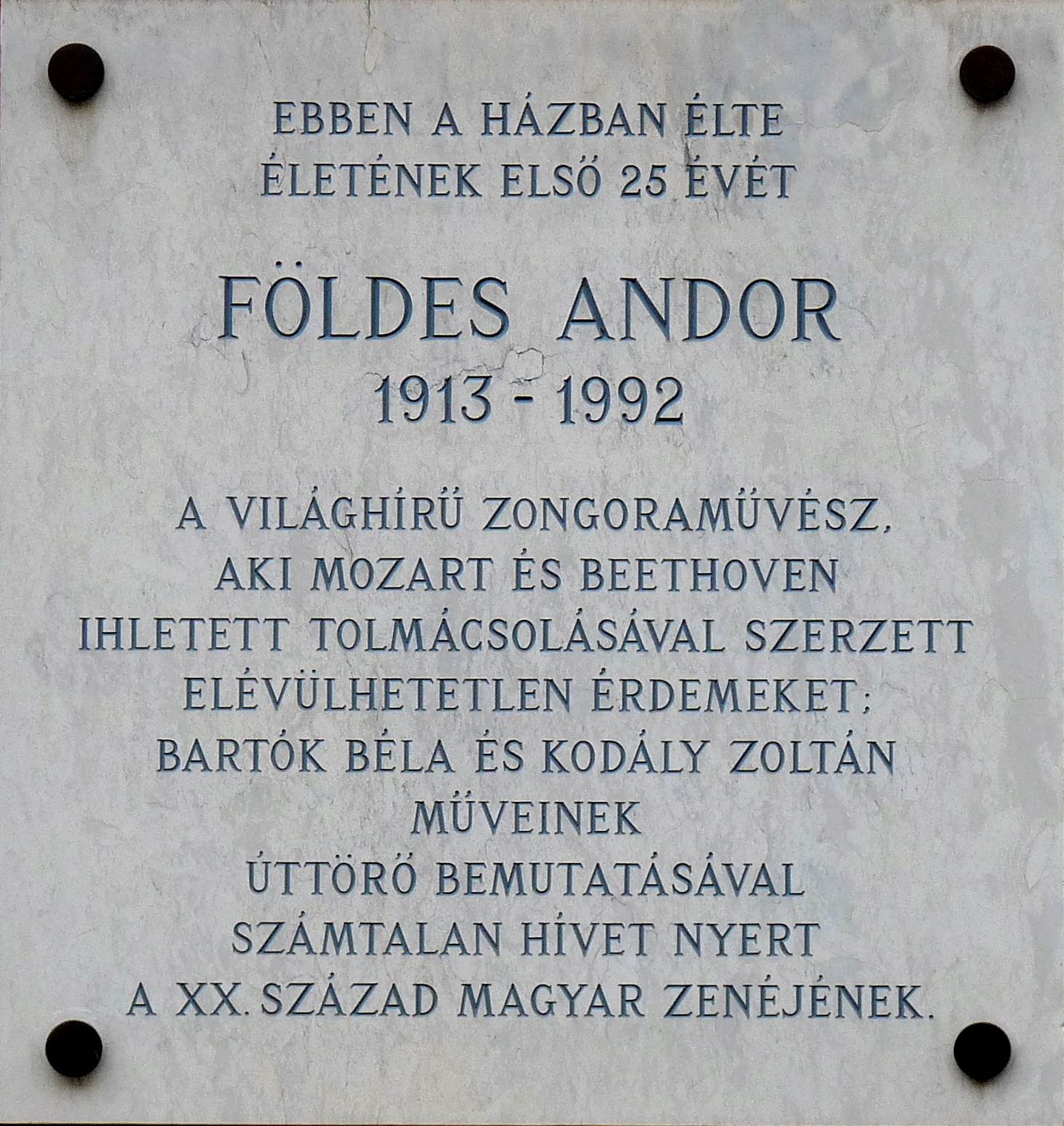
Commemorative plaque on the house in Budapest where he lived his first 25 years

Andor Földes (later Andor Foldes; 21 December 1913 – 9 February 1992) was a Hungarian pianist born in Budapest, who later took American citizenship.

== Career ==
Földes first studied the piano with his mother, Valerie Ipolye, and with Tibor Szatmari in his home town of Óbuda. He made his public debut performing a Mozart concerto with the Budapest Philharmonic when he was 8 years old (1921). He entered the Franz Liszt Academy of Music in 1922. Földes studied with Ernő Dohnányi until 1932 and with Béla Bartók from 1929. On April 30, 1934 he played the Piano Concerto No. 1 by Johannes Brahms live in Hungarian Radio together with Royal Opera Orchestra conducted by Lajos Rajter. He made his American debut in a radio recital in 1940, and his recital debut at New York Town Hall in 1941. On November 3, 1947, he performed Bartók's Second Piano Concerto in the opening concert of the 18th season of the National Orchestral Association, conducted by Léon Barzin, at Carnegie Hall in New York City 1947. It was the first performance of the concerto in New York, though there had been earlier American performances in Chicago, Pittsburgh, and San Francisco and Bartok himself had performed the work in 1940 in Cleveland with the Cleveland Orchestra conducted by Artur Rodzinski. His 1948 recording of the Bartók 2nd piano concerto is prized by collectors, as is a set of Bartók works he recorded for Deutsche Grammophon, which won the Grand Prix du Disque and other prizes. Földes met his wife (Lili Rendy), a Hungarian journalist, in New York and they became U.S. citizens (see his wife's book Two on the Continent Dutton, 1947). Due to his European concert engagements being more plentiful than his American ones, he and his wife moved to Europe, settling in Switzerland in 1961. Besides a large discography, which includes not only Bartók but also works by Mozart, Beethoven, Brahms, Falla, Debussy, Poulenc, Liszt, Schubert, Schumann, and Rachmaninoff, Földes was the author of "Keys to the Keyboard" (1948), an article in the Etude Magazine(USA) (December, 1953) "Impressions of a Musical Journey to Africa", and an article "Beethoven's Kiss" in Reader's Digest (November 1986), also an autobiography 70 Years on Music's Magic Carpet (published 2004).

Among his awards are the Grand Cross of Merit, given by Germany in 1959 for his help in raising funds to have the Beethoven Halle in Bonn rebuilt, and the Silver Medal of the City of Paris, given in 1969.

Földes died at his home in Herrliberg, Switzerland, on February 9, 1992, after falling down a flight of stairs. He was 78 years old. At the time he was preparing to give an eight-day master class at the Beethoven House in Bonn later that year.

== Awards ==
- For his service to the reconstruction of the Beethovenhalle in Bonn – for which he gave concerts in New York, London, Buenos Aires, Bonn and other cities – and as recognition for his artistic legacy, Andor Földes was awarded the Grand Service Cross of the German Bundesrepublik in 1964.
- In France in 1968 the pianist was honoured with the distinction "Commandeur du Mérite Artistique et Culturel" for his playing of Debussy.
- For his recordings of the Bartók piano works, the German Phono-Akademie awarded Andor Földes the German Schallplattenpreis 1982, in the category "Historic Recording".

== Writings ==
- Keys to the Keyboard: A Book for Pianists, with Explanatory Music. New York: E. P. Dutton, 1948. Reprinted, with an introductory letter from Sir Malcolm Sargent, London and New York: Oxford University Press, 1950, 1951, 1964, 1968. Sixth impression 1972. German translation, as Wege zum Klavier: Kleine Ratgeber für Pianisten, translated by Marguerite M. Schlüter, Wiesbaden: Limes-Verlag, 1948, reprinted 1952. Second German edition, 1963. Third German edition 1978, ISBN 3-8090-2141-5. Fourth German edition Wiesbaden and Munich: Limes, 1986, ISBN 3-8090-2141-5. Fifth German edition Frankfurt and Berlin: Edition Bergh im Verlag Ullstein. ISBN 3-7163-0223-6. Finnish edition, as Pianonsoiton avaimet, translated by Margareta Jalas, Porvooo: WSOY, 1950. Dutch edition, as Hoekstenen van het klavierspel, translated by Willem Henri Alting van Geusau, with a foreword by Piet Tiggers, Assen: Born, 1951; second edition 1953. Spanish edition, as Claves del teclado: un libro para pianistas, translated by F. Walter Liebling, Manuales musicales Ricordi, Buenos Aires: Ricordi Americana, 1958.
- "Two on the Continent" Lilli Földes. Dutton 1947.
- "Current Chronicle: Norway". The Musical Quarterly 35, no. 1 (January 1949): 141–146.
- "Impressions of a Musical journey to Africa" Etude Magazine (USA), December 1953.
- "Béla Bartók". Tempo new series, no. 43 (Spring 1957): 20+22-26.
- "Kodály". Tempo new series, no. 46 (Winter 1958): 8–11.
- "Reminiscence and Reassessment". The Musical Times 102, no. 1426 (December 1961): 768–69
- Gibt es einen zeitgenössischen Beethoven-Stil? (Is there a contemporary Beethoven-style?) (Limes Verlag, Wiesbaden 1963)
- "Beethoven's Kiss". Reader's Digest. November 1986. Page 145.
- Erinnerungen. (Memoirs) (Limes Verlag/im Verlag Ullstein, Frankfurt a.M./Berlin 1993)
- "Seventy Years on Music's Magic Carpet" (Publ. 2004)

== See also ==
- Földes (surname)

== Bibliography ==
- Riemann Musik Lexikon (B.Schott's Söhne, Mainz 1959).
- R. P. 1947. "Concert Features Bartók Selection". The New York Times (4 November): 33.
- Hans-Peter Range, Die Konzertpianisten der Gegenwart (Concert Pianists of To-day) (Moritz Schauenburg-Verlag, Lahr (Schwarzwald) 1964).
- Wolf-Eberhard von Lewinski, Andor Foldes (Rembrandt Verlag, Berlin 1970).
- New York Times. Obituary. February 19, 1992.
- See the Andor Földes music collection (including letters, programs etc.) at Óbuda Museum, Hungary
