= Imre Földes =

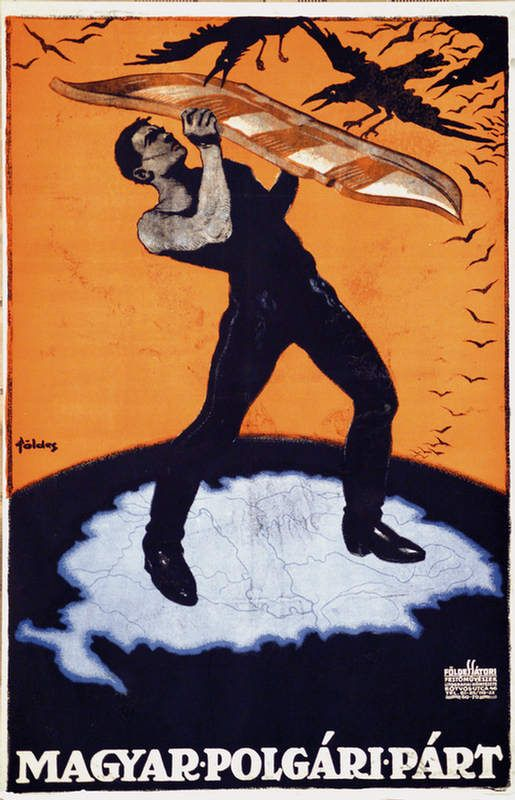
Election poster for the National Civic Party

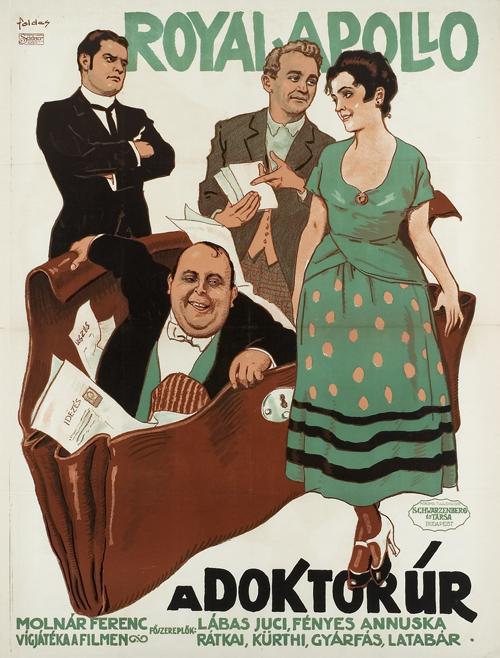
Poster for Mr. Doctor, a silent film directed by Michael Curtiz; from a play by Ferenc Molnár. Starring Márton Rátkai, György Kürthy and Juci Lábass

Imre Földes (5 May 1881, Budapest - 1948?, Budapest) was a Hungarian graphic artist, painter, book designer, poster artist and engraver.

== Biography ==
In 1897, at the age of sixteen, he began his studies at the commercial drawing school (Kereskedelmi Szakközépiskola) in Budapest. A year later, he transferred to the Royal Drawing School, where he studied with László Hegedüs and Tivadar Zemplényi. He completed his studies in Berlin and Vienna.

His interest in advertising and poster art manifested itself from the very beginning and he established himself as a commercial artist. In 1910, he exhibited his poster designs at the Hall of Art. The critical response was positive. That same year, and again in 1917, he participated in competitions for postage stamp designs; depicting Saint Stephen and Emperor Charles I with his wife, Empress Zita. Several of his designs were used on stamps issued in 1918. Shortly after, he founded a lithography workshop, where he created movie posters in collaboration with Lipót Sátori.

During the Red May, April 29 - May 5, 1919 in the short-lived Hungarian Soviet Republic proclaimed by the Revolutionary Governing Council on 21 March 1919, Földes, artist Lipót Sátori and Hungarian silent cinema's set designer István Szirontai Lhotka created a red reel on a carriage drawn by 6 white horses for the march of filmmakers in support of the revolutionary government.

In 1921, due to political unrest in Hungary, he moved to Romania. There, in Timișoara, he was offered a leading position at Helikon Typography and spent some time as their artistic director. He maintained contacts with Budapest, however, and his posters continued to appear there. He later moved to Oradea, where he took a position with Typografie Sonnenfeld, designing book covers. He also produced illustrations for the local newspaper. In 1927, he and the painter Béla Zsigmond (?-1945) opened an art school. Two years later, he became Romania's representative to "The International Poster" exhibition in Munich.

In 1931, together with two local artists, Roman Paul Mottl and Jenő Iványi, he founded another school, for decorative art. In 1933, he was one of the organizers of the "Exhibition of Young Artists", held by the Asociația Artelor Frumoase Oradea. The Journalists' Club of Oradea hosted a personal exhibition of his miniatures in 1936.

After the outbreak of World War II, his work received progressively less attention. By 1945, he was forgotten. Although he returned to Budapest and continued to work, he died in obscurity and the exact date of his death is unknown. In 1976, some of his works were shown at "L´art 1900 en Hongrie", an exhibit at the Petit Palais in Paris.
