= REVSTAT =

- Discipline: Statistics
- Language: English

Publication details
- Former name: Revista de Estatística
- History: 2003-present
- Publisher: Instituto Nacional de Estatística (Portugal)
- Frequency: Biannually
- Open access: Yes

Standard abbreviations
- ISO 4: REVSTAT

Indexing
- ISSN: 1645-6726
- OCLC no.: 191753778

Links
- Journal homepage; Online access

REVSTAT is a peer-reviewed open access scientific journal that publishes papers related to statistics. It is published in English by the Instituto Nacional de Estatística, the national statistical office of Portugal. The journal was established in 2003, when it replaced the journal Revista de Estatística. It publishes two issues each year, both in print (subscription) and online as open access.

== Abstracting and indexing ==
REVSTAT is abstracted and indexed in Current Index to Statistics, Science Citation Index Expanded, MathSciNet, Statistical Theory and Method Abstracts, and Zentralblatt MATH.
