= Zou Zhe =

Zou Zhe (simplified Chinese: 邹喆; traditional Chinese: 鄒喆; pinyin: Zōu Zhé; Wade–Giles: Tsou Che c. 1636-ca. 1708), was a Chinese painter during the Qing Dynasty.

Zou was born in Wuxi in Jiangsu province. His courtesy name was Fanglu (方鲁). He lived in Nanjing, and later became known as one of the Eight Masters of Nanjing. Zou specialized in landscapes and bird-and-flower paintings though only his landscape paintings still exist.
