= Wudong Bridge =

Wudong Bridge 五洞桥
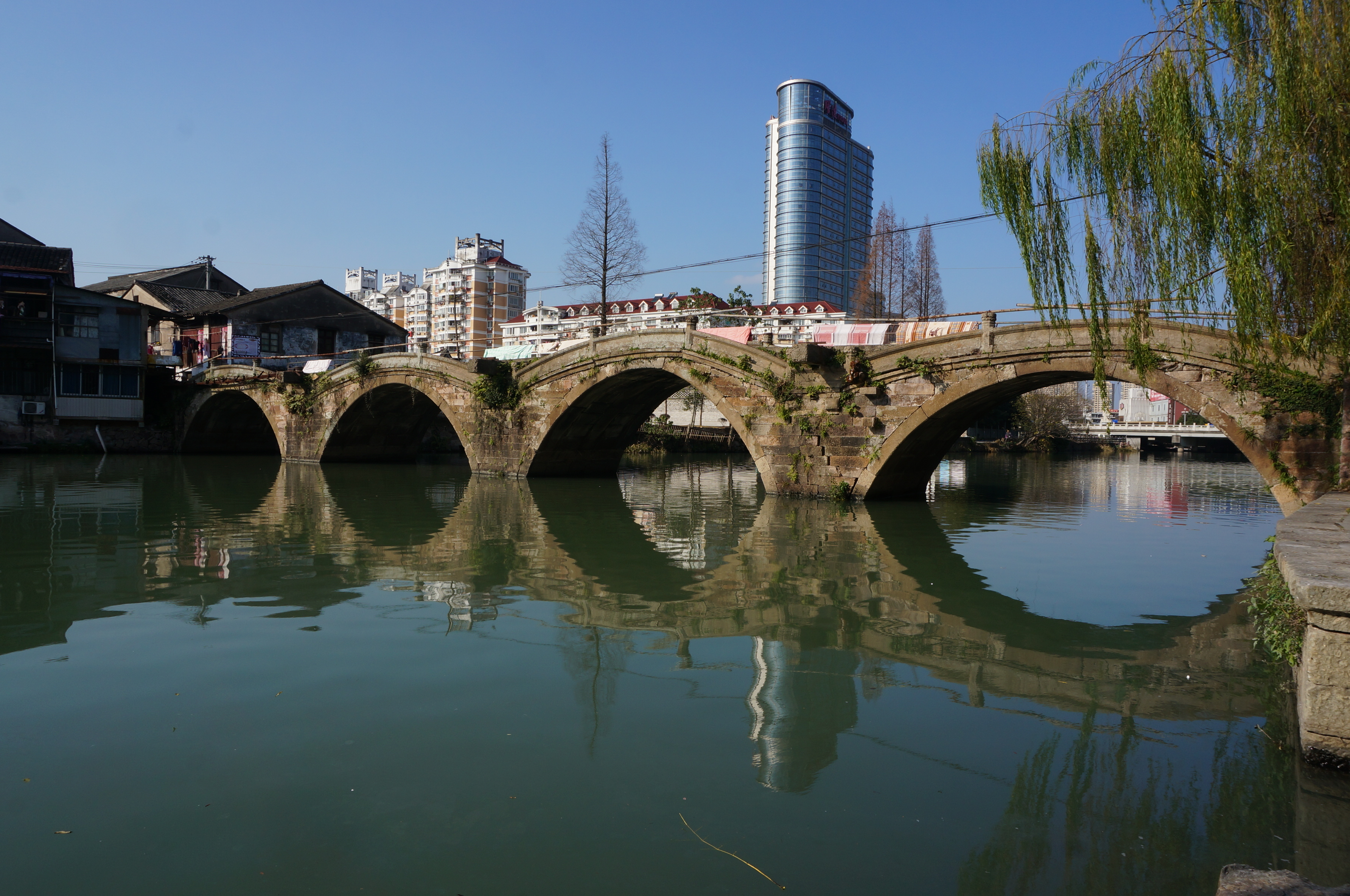
- Wudong Bridge in December 2016
- Coordinates: 28°39′13″N 121°15′45″E
- Carries: Pedestrians and bicycles
- Crosses: West River (西江河)
- Locale: Huangyan District, Taizhou, Zhejiang, China

Characteristics
- Design: Arch bridge
- Material: Stone
- Total length: 63.5 metres (208 ft)
- Width: 4.3 metres (14 ft)

History
- Construction end: 1086–1094
- Rebuilt: 1735

Location
- Interactive map of Wudong Bridge

The Wudong Bridge (simplified Chinese: 五洞桥; traditional Chinese: 五洞橋; pinyin: Wudong Qiáo; lit. 'Five Arches Bridge'), also known as Xiaoyou Bridge (孝友桥) and West Bridge (西桥), is a historic stone arch bridge over the West River in Huangyan District, Taizhou, Zhejiang, China. The bridge is 63.5 metres (208 ft) long and 4.3 metres (14 ft) wide with five arches.

== History ==
The originally bridge was built by Zhang Yuanzhong (张元仲) during the era of Emperor Zhezong of the Song dynasty (960–1279), and named after his courtesy name "Xiaoyou" (孝友). It was completely destroyed by a catastrophic flood in 1196. Local people Zhao Boyun (赵伯沄) donated property to rebuild the bridge and renamed it "Wudong Bridge". It became dilapidated for neglect through the following dynasties. In 1735 during the ruling of Yongzheng Emperor of the Qing dynasty (1644–1911), General Wu Jinyi (吴进义), entrusted Shiyue (世月), a Buddhist monk from Mingyin Temple (明因寺), to rebuild the temple.

In December 1989, it has been the focus of the Government of Zhejiang as a provincial cultural heritage conservation unit.

== Gallery ==
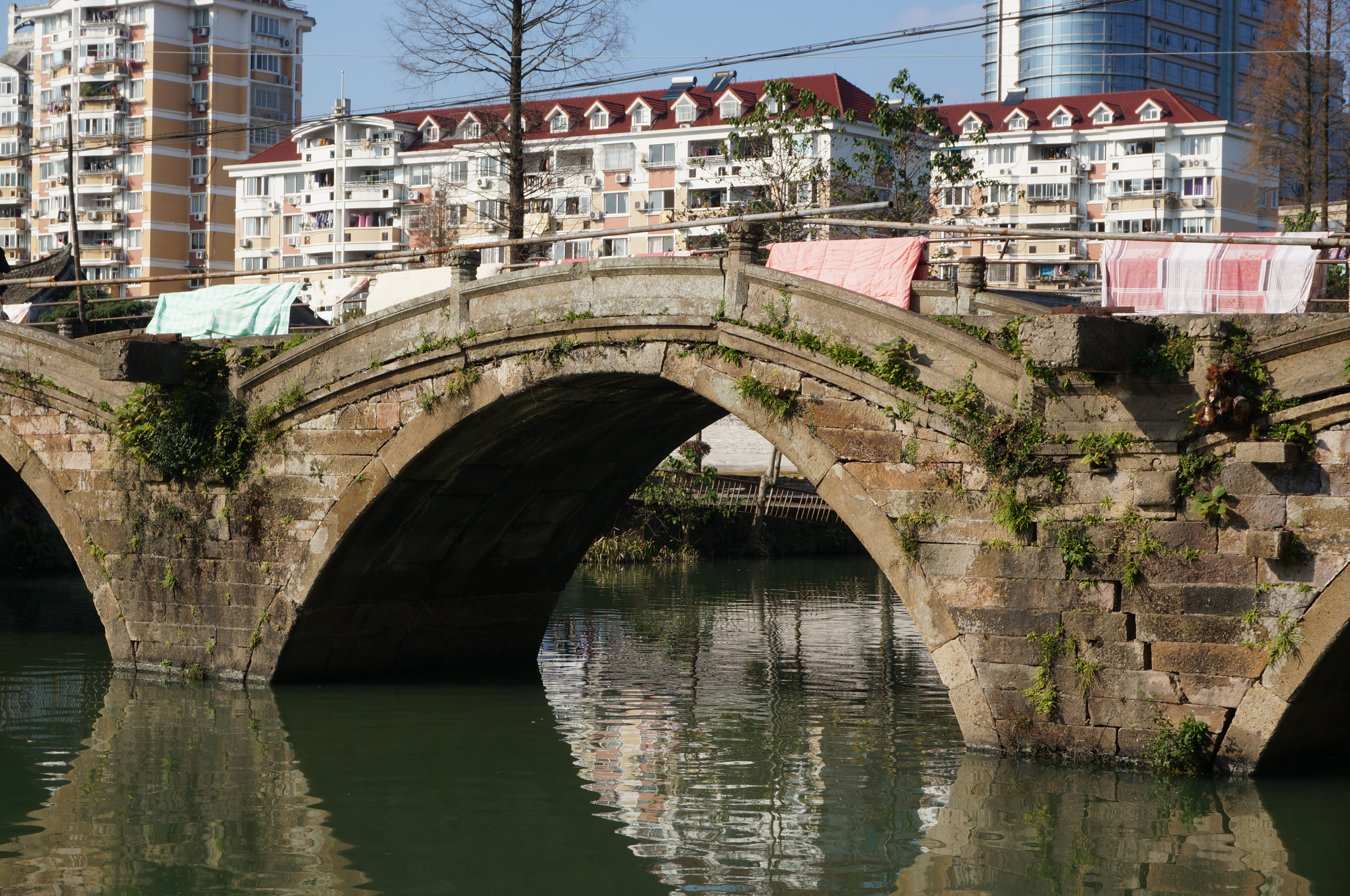
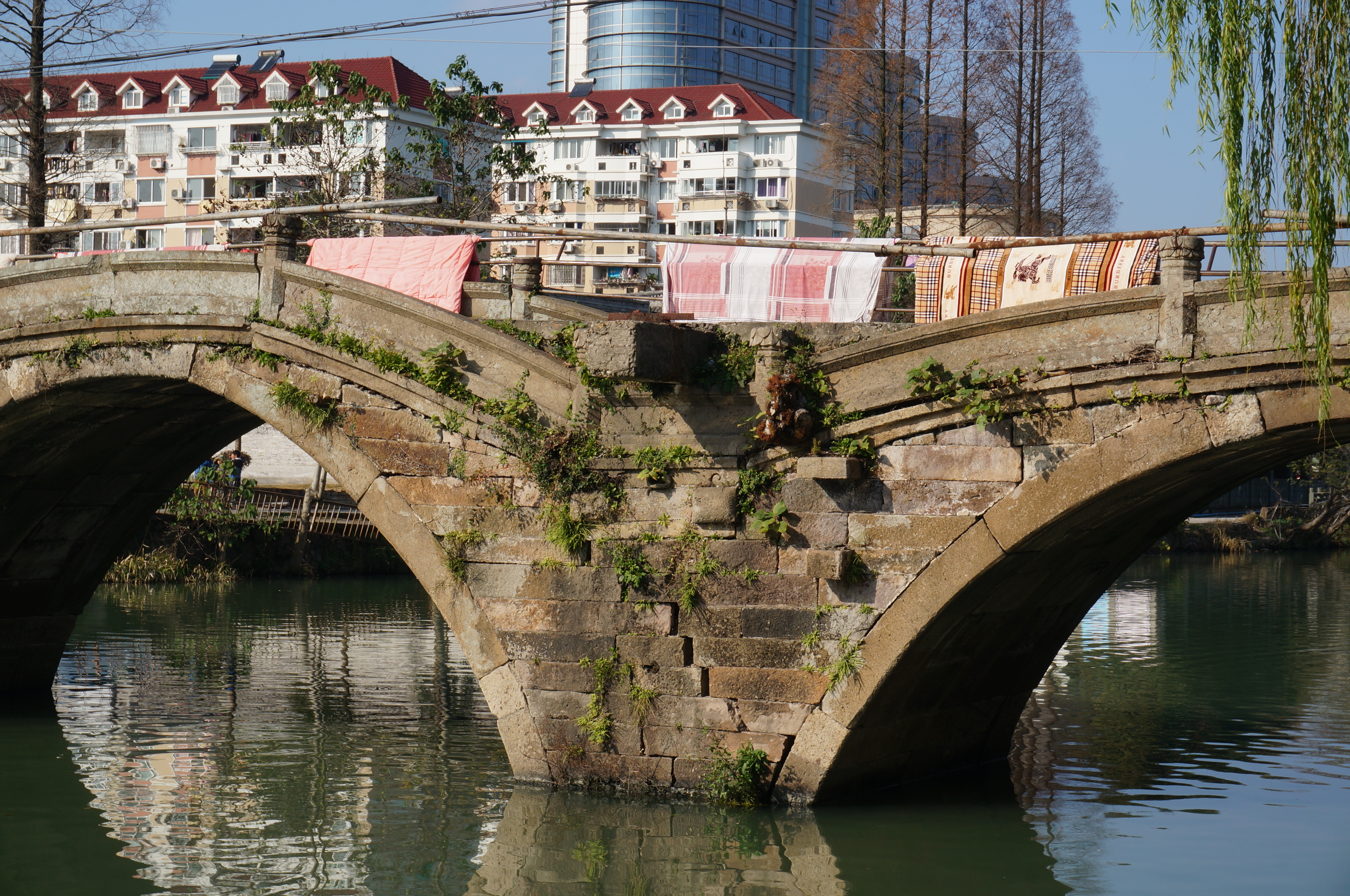
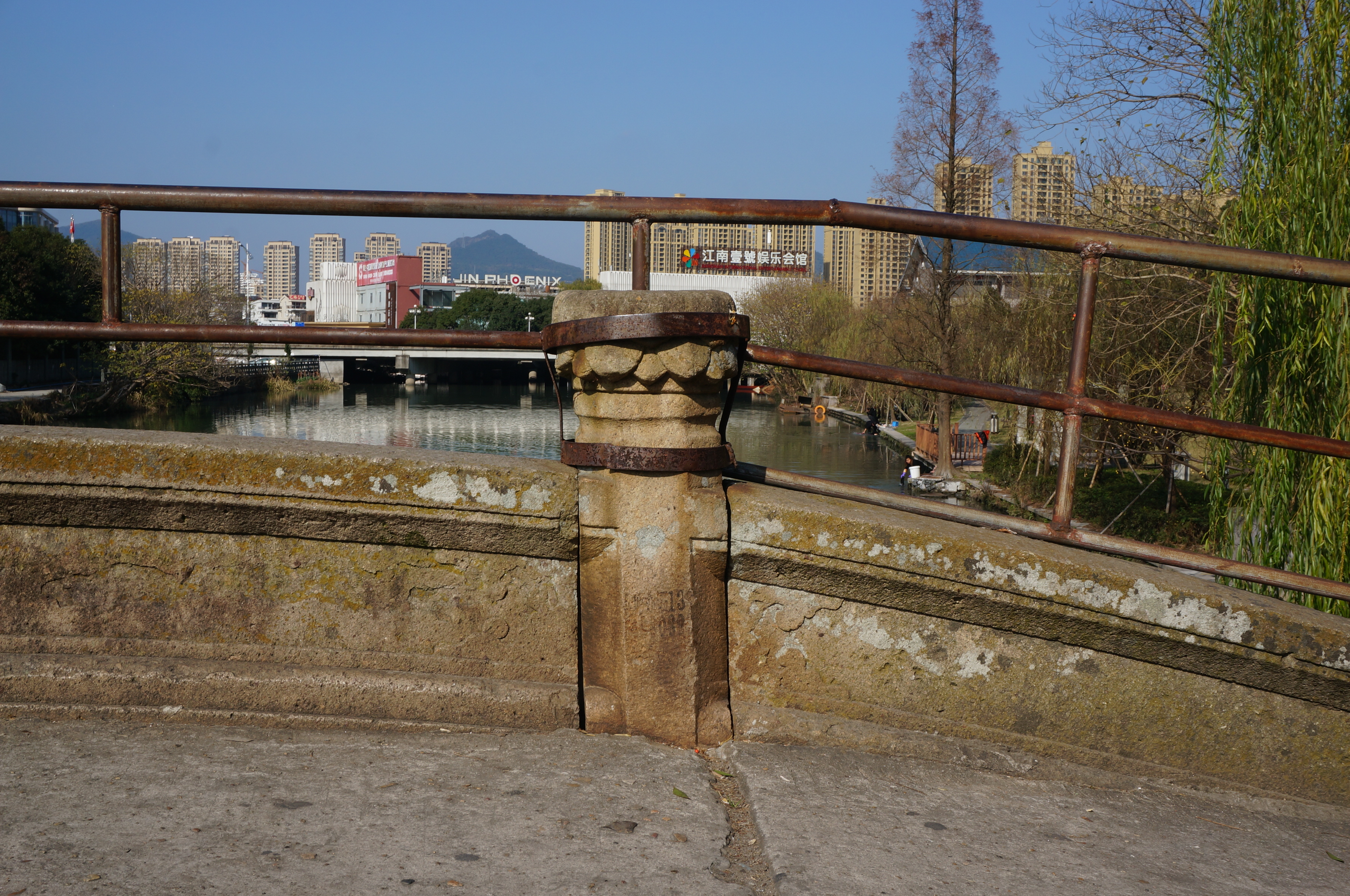
