= László Földes =

Hungarian architect

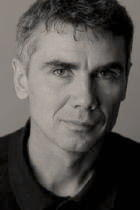

László Földes (born 1959) is a Hungarian architect.

He studied architecture at the Technical University of Budapest, where he received his degree in 1985. After that he held a scholarship at the Helsinki University of Technology. One year later, in 1989 he returned to Finland to work in the Kari Järvinen-Timo Airas architect studio. He founded his own architectural firm in 1994 in Budapest.

His most important works include the Forest School in Visegrád (with Gábor Turányi), the gymnasium of Toldy High School located next to the slope of Buda Castle, W.E.T. Innovation Center in Pilisszentiván, and three dwelling houses in Maassluis, the Netherlands. First time in the world he built in his dwelling house at Szilas-brook, Budapest the Red dot design award-winner "light transmitting concrete" (LiTraCon) invented by a young Hungarian architect, Áron Losonczi.

He was elected to UIA (International Union of Architects) Council on the General Assembly held in Turin, Italy, July 2008.

== Awards ==
- 1985 Diploma Prize, Apartment building, Király Street, Budapest
- 1997 Pro Architectura Award (Forest School in Visegrád)
- 2004 Toldy 150 emlékérem, (Toldy Gimnázium tornaterme)
- 2004 Pro Architectura Award (WET Innovation Center, Pilisszentiván (now: Gentherm Hungary Kft.)
- 2005 Fair Play Award, NOC of Hungary, "Action Category", Toldy High School
- 2005 Media Architecture Award (Dwelling house + light - transmitting concrete))
- 2006 Ybl Miklós Award
- 2011 "House of the Year 2011", (House with steel porch, Nagykovácsi)

== Design competitions ==
- 1999 3 houses – Maassluis, Netherlands – invited competition - I. place
- 2004 High Court of Justice and Attorney General's Office – Győr - national competition - II. place
- 2006 Reformatic Church, Nagykovácsi- invited competition – II. place
- 2006 Paks, Erzsébet Hotel - invited competition – shared I. place
- 2007 Ritz-Carlton Hotel, Budapest, Vigadó Street - invited competition- II. place
- 2008 Balatonalmádi Health Center - invited competition – I. place
- 2009 Kemenes Vulcanopark Visitor Center, Celldömölk - open competition - I. place
- 2010 Enlargement of National Museum, national competition - III. place
- 2010 Pestszentimre, Kindergarten, national competition - I. place

== Exhibitions ==
- 1996 Piran, Piran days of architecture, Forest School in Visegrád
- 2002 Piran, Piran days of architecture, WET Innovation Center
- 2003 Budapest, Műcsarnok, „Közben”
- 2004 London, RIBA, „Hungarian Architecture Today”, WET Innovation Center
- 2004 Glasgow, Lighthouse „Hungarian Architecture Today”, WET Innovation Center
- 2004 Leiden, Freiburg, Graz, Kolozsvár, Tranzit 15 traveling exhibition, FL interview, videoinstallation
- 2005 Berlin, DAZ, „Emerging Identities! East”, Gym of Toldy High School Gym
- 2006 Budapest Historical Museum, Three centuries of the Györgyi-Giergl Families
- 2006 Budapest, N&n Galéria, Lane schedule, independent exhibition
- 2010 Budapest, Műcsarnok, Modellfest
- 2013 Piran, Piran days of architecture, Kemenes Volcanopark
- 2014 Budapest, Műcsarnok, I. Architectural National Salon; Sauflon, Kemenes Volcanopark

== Hungarian projects ==
- 1996 Forest School, Visegrád, „Pro Architectura Award” (Turányi, Földes, Göde,)
- 1999 Tree houses, Maassluis, Hollandia (Földes, Pethő)
- 2002 W.E.T. Innovation Center (today: Gentherm Hungary Kft.), Pilisszentiván, „Pro Architectura Award” (Pethő, Földes)
- 2004 Dwelling house, Budapest, „Media Architectural Award” (Földes)
- 2004 Gym of Toldy Gimnázium, Budapest, „Pro Architectura Award” (Földes, Mórocz)
- 2005 Ladányi house, Nagykovácsi, realized, (Földes)
- 2006 Residential building, Budapest, realized, (Földes, Gönczi)
- 2006 Lisznyai Street, Attic building, Budapest (Földes, Fuferenda, Abou Abdo)
- 2006 High Court of Justice, Debrecen, realized, (Koller, Csatai, Földes, Pethő)
- 2007 Szegvár, renovation of County Hall, licensing plan, monument (Földes, Mórocz)
- 2008 Mikos Castel Hotel, Mikosszéplak, licensing plan, monument (Földes, Balogh)
- 2009 Etyek, urban study plan, (Földes, Sugár, Losonczi)
- 2009 „L” house, Lábatlan, realized, (Földes, Gönczi)
- 2009 House with steel porch, Nagykovácsi „House of the Year 2011” (Földes, Balogh)
- 2010 Toldy High School, reconstruction of the main building, I. phase, realized, (Földes, Vértesy)
- 2011 Archbishop’s Palace in Eger, Visitor Center, construction plan, monument (Földes, Farkas, Vértesy)
- 2011 Zsámbék, Nursery, realized, (Földes, Balogh)
- 2011 Balatonalmádi Health Center, realized, (Földes, Balogh)
- 2011 Steel-terrace house, Budapest (Földes, Holics, Csűri)
- 2012 Nagykovácsi, chapel reconstruction, realized (Földes, Golda)
- 2012 Szabadkígyós, Wenckheim Castel, licensing plan, monument (Földes, Balogh)
- 2012 Kiskőrös, János Vitéz Visitor Center, licensing plan (Földes, Balogh, Szlabey)
- 2013 Keszthely, Amazon house interior design, tenderplan, monument (Földes, Szlabey, Deigner)
- 2013 Keszthely Festetics Castel interior design, tenderplan, monument (Földes, Szlabey, Balogh)
- 2013 Keszthely, Festetics Kastély Castel, tenderplan, monument (Csontos, Balogh, Földes)
- 2013 Gyula, Almásy-Wenckheim Castel, construction plan, monument (Földes, Balogh)
- 2013 The Long Brick House, Pilisborosjenő, (Földes, Sónicz)
- 2013 Black and White ház, Budaörs, (Földes, Sónicz)
- 2013 Graphisoft Dormitory and Incubatorhouse, Budapest, study plan (Földes, Sirokai)
- 2013 Zirci Abbey, Visitor Center, installation, monument (Szlabey, Vértesy, Földes)
- 2013 Egervár, Nádasdy-Széchenyi Castely, interior design, monument (Szlabey, Vértesy, Földes)
- 2013 Kemenes Volcanopark Visitor Center, Celldömölk (Földes, Balogh, Tatár-Gönczi)
- 2013 Sauflon Center of Innovation, Gyál, Hungary, (Földes, Csűri, Holics)
- 2013 Nagykovácsi, Nursery, construction plan (Földes, Sónicz)
- 2014 Tihany, Old Port (Földes, Farkas, Sugár)

== Foreign projects ==
- 1990 Residential Houses, Jollas, Helsinki (Airas)
- 1991 School, Imatran Koulu, Finnország (Järvinen, Airas, Himanen)
- 1991 School, Mankkaan Koulu, Espoo (Järvinen, Airas)
- 1999 Three houses, Maassluis, Hollandia (Földes, Pethő)
- 2007 Sports center and hotel, design project, Vyborg, Oroszország (Jankovics, Deák, Földes)

== Selected publications ==
- 1997 Domus N/795 (Milano), Forest School in Visegrád
- 1999 World Architecture’80, (London), Forest School in Visegrád
- 1999 Octogon, ‘99/1, Tree houses Maasslouis, Hollandia, (Budapest)
- 2000 History of Hungary’s Architecture, (szerző: Sisa, Wiebenson)
- 2002 5 Houses, Venice Biennale, book, (Budapest)
- 2005 L’industria delle costruzioni (Italy)
- 2005 Weltweite Objekte (Germany)
- 2006 Brick’06, Callwey (München), Gym of Toldy High School
- 2007 Atlas 2000, Global Architecture, book (Bilbao)
- 2008 Brick’08 Callwey (München)
- 2012 A10 new European architecture, No.45. (Amsterdam), Nursery in Zsámbék
- 2014 ORIS (Croatia), Sauflon Center of Innovation
- 2014 Piranesi, Kemenes Volcanopark Visitor Center
- 2014 Brick’14, Nursery in Zsámbék
