= Gong Xian =

17th-century Nanjing school painter

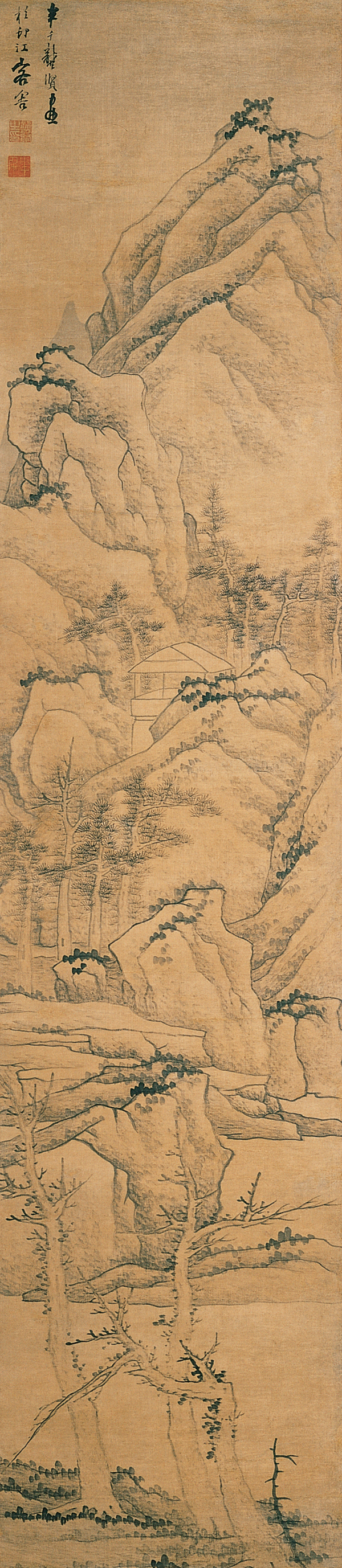
Landscape, c. 1650, ink on silk painting by Gong Xian, Kimbell Art Museum

Gong Xian (simplified Chinese: 龚贤; traditional Chinese: 龔賢; pinyin: Gōng Xián; Wade–Giles: Kung Hsien; 1618–1689; the specific year of birth is disputed as early as 1617 or as late as 1620; born in Kunshan, Jiangsu) was a Chinese painter in the late Ming and early Qing Dynasties, one of the Eight Masters of Nanjing (Jinling) and the leading painter of the Nanjing school.

He was also known as Qixian (岂贤), Banqian (半千), Banmu (半亩) and Yeyi (野遗); Chaizhangren (柴丈人) and Zhongshanyelao (钟山野老). He enjoyed equal popularity with the poet and calligrapher Lu Qian in the early Qing Dynasty. They were called "Two Ban of the World" (天下二半), (Gong Xian: Banqian; Lu Qian, Banyin).

== Artistic career ==
Primarily a landscape painter, mountains were the subject of most of Gong Xian's paintings. Willows are also a common theme in his work.

Gong Xian was a scholar loyal to the fallen Ming Dynasty. In the early years, he participated in the reunification activities. During the war in the late Ming Dynasty, he was forced to flee to save his life and drifted away. He spent many years at Yangzhou in exile, during which he continued to author anti-Qing works, and develop his characteristic "light Gong" and "dark Gong" styles.

Gong Xian was also one of the literati and known for his work with prose and poetry. It was only after the fall of Nanjing to the Qing that he took up professional painting as his primary means of making a living. However, despite painting several great pieces over his life, he ultimately died as he lived, in poverty.

== Notable works ==
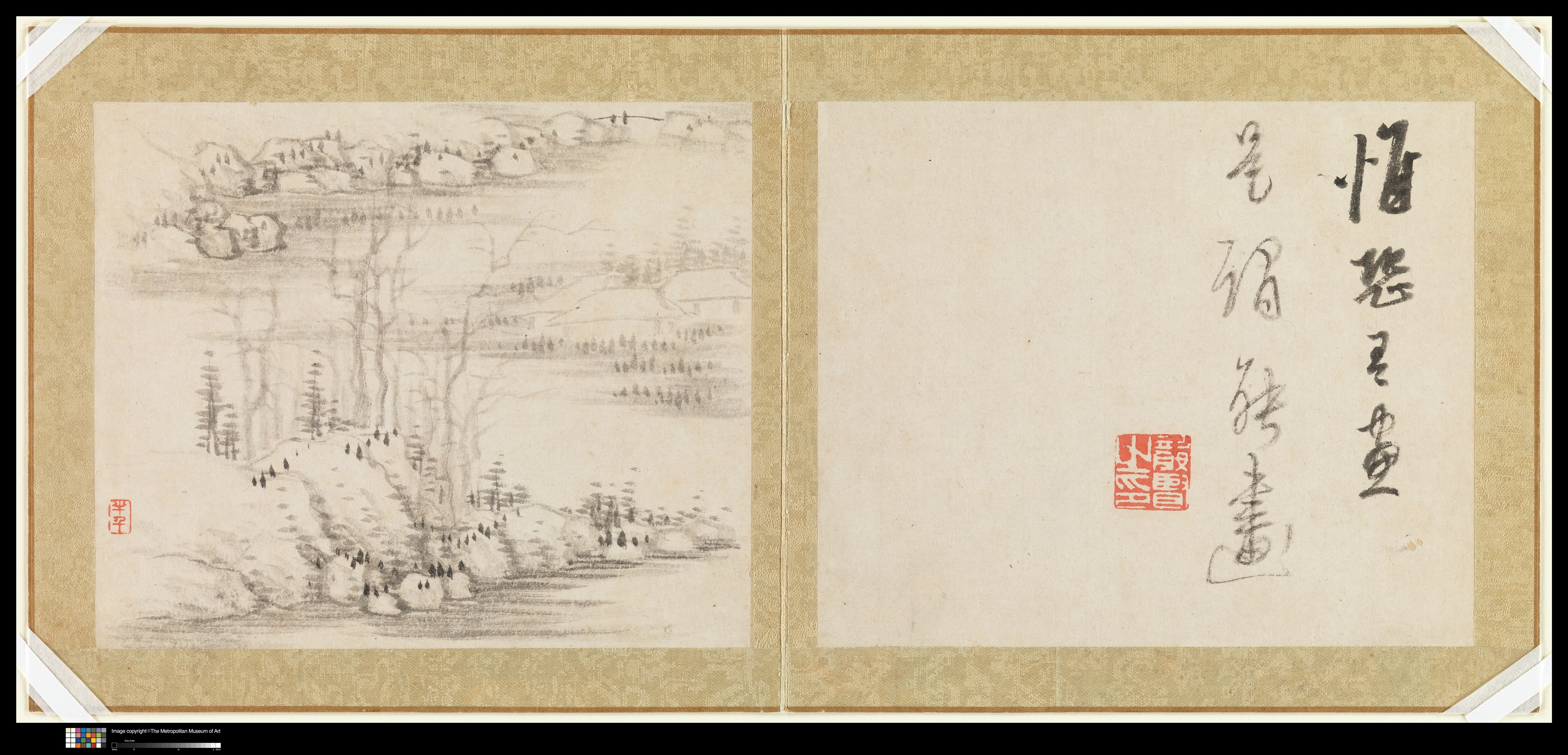
Landscapes and trees

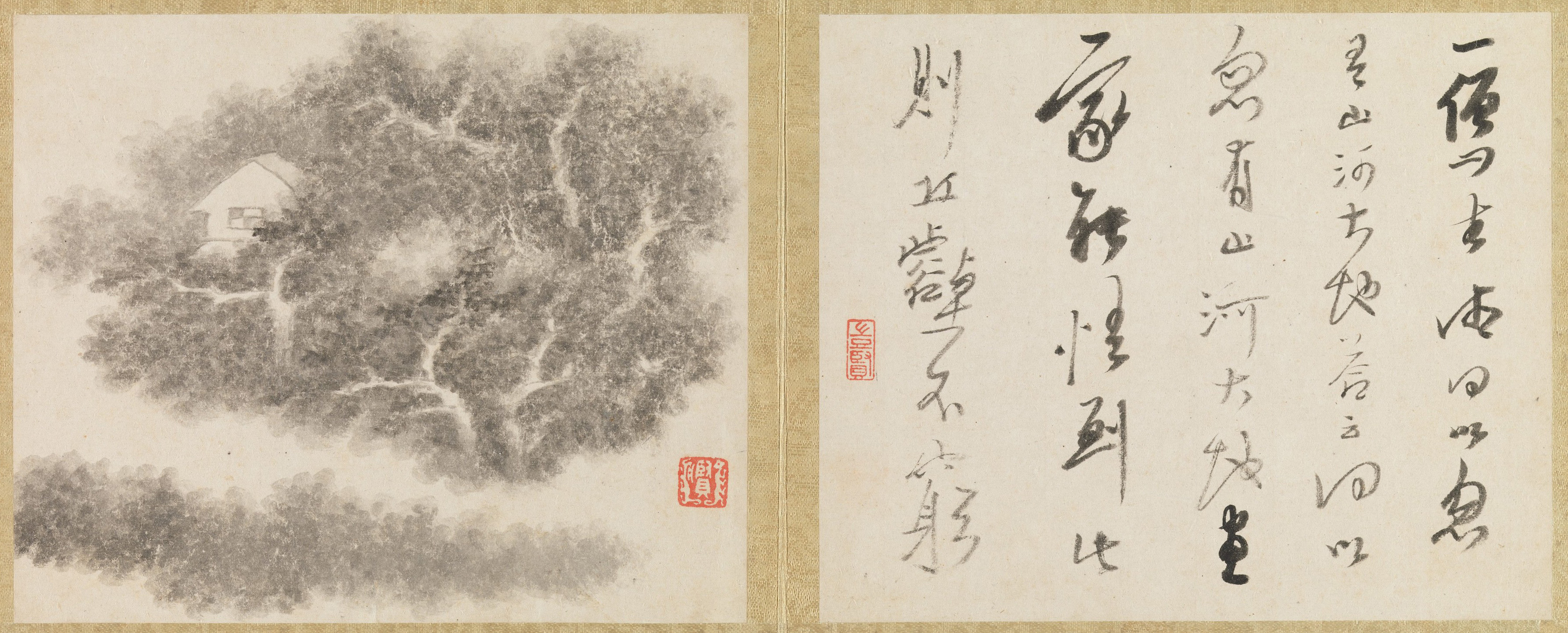
Landscapes and trees

=== Painting ===
- Landscapes and trees
- Landscapes of the Twelve Months
- Dwelling among Mountains and Clouds
- Landscapes with Poems
- Landscapes with Poems

=== Poetry ===
- Plane
- Drinking in Xu's Garden
- Swallows to go east

=== Literary works ===
- Caoxiangtang Collection
- Painting Technique
- Chai Zhangren's Draft
- Gong Banqian's Paintings
- Poetry Meeting
- Banmu Garden Poetry Grass
- Banmu Garden Pond
- Midnight Tang Shi Ji

== Character Memorial ==
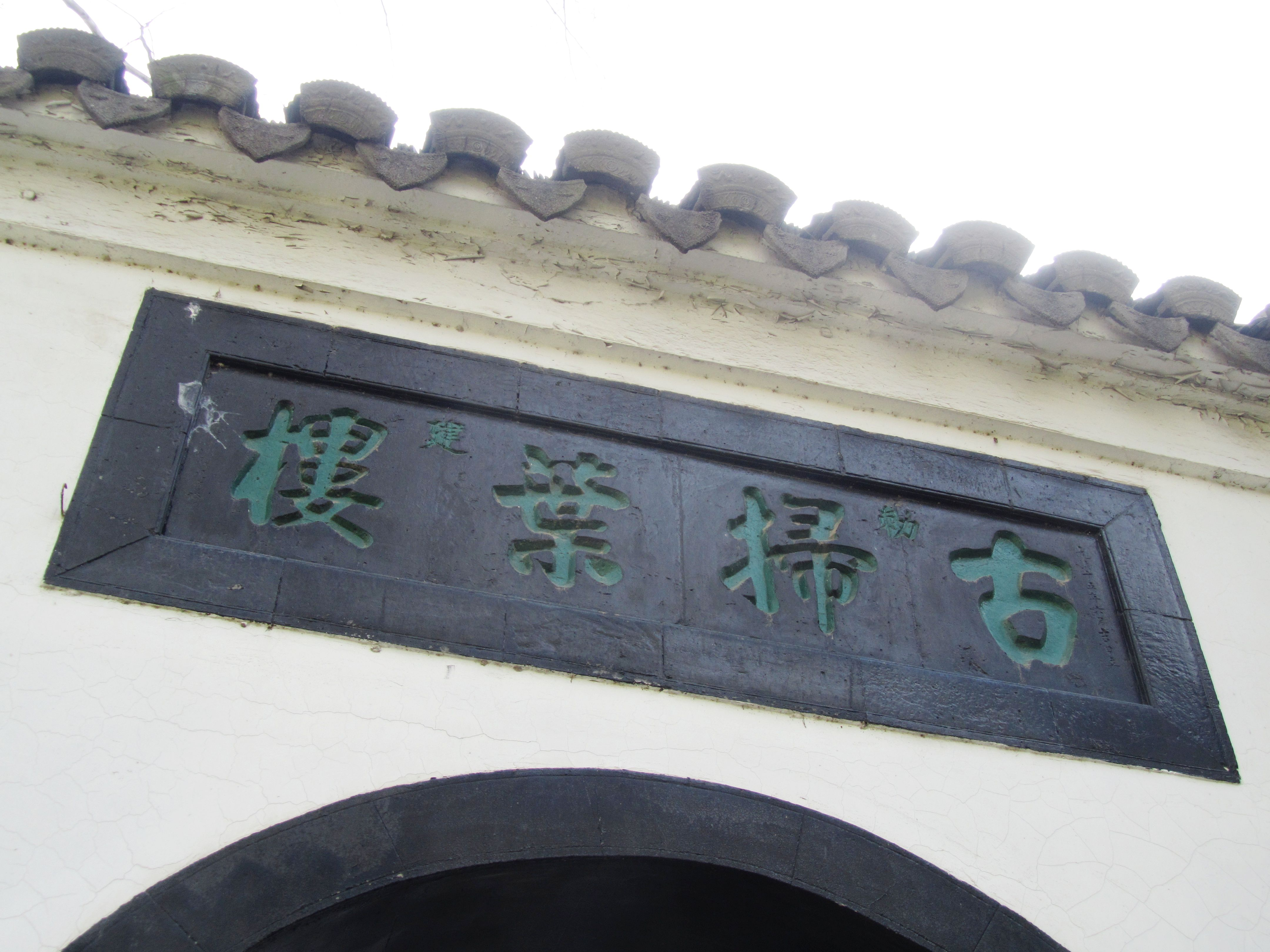
Former Residence of Gong Xian

The word "Qingliangshan" on the stone plaque in the middle of the gate of Soyelou was written by Gong Xian. The Memorial Hall was built on the southwest side of Qingliang Mountain. Regarding the origin of the name of the Saoye Tower, there are historical records in the Qianlong period of the Qing Dynasty. Gong Xian once made a self-portrait. In this painting, he turned into a monk who was sweeping leaves, which was named the Saoye Tower. The building was destroyed by fire in the Qing Dynasty. In 1889, at the edict of Emperor Guangxu, the building was rebuilt, and it was rebuilt twice in 1901 and 1914.
