= Tivadar Zemplényi =

Hungarian painter (1864–1917)

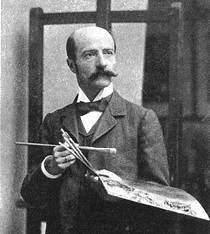
- Tivadar Zemplényi
- Born: 1864; Prešov, Hungary
- Died: 1917 (aged 52–53); Budapest, Hungary
- Known for: Painter
- Movement: Munich Realism
- Awards: Silver medal, St. Louis World's Fair, 1904

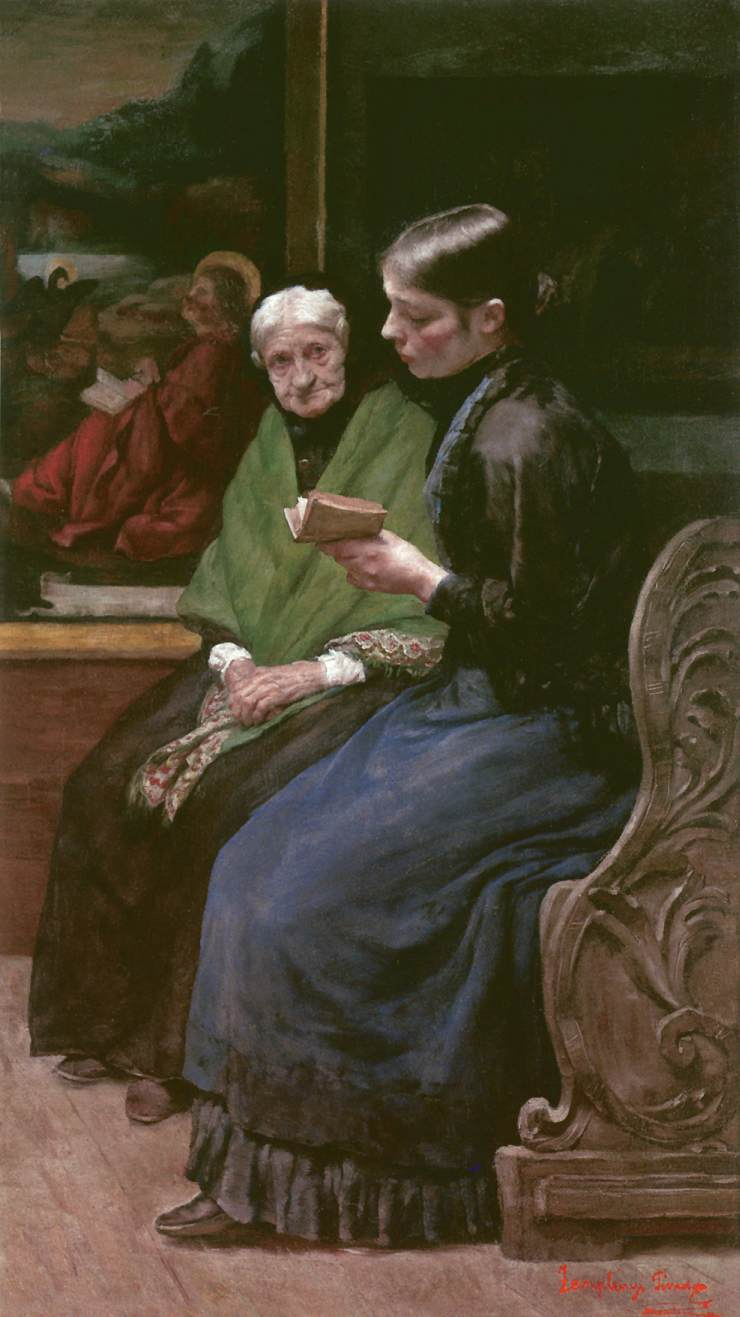
Zemplényi's In the Church (1889), exhibited at the 1900 Paris Exposition

Tivadar Zemplényi (1864– 1917) was a Hungarian painter, noted for his realism. A medalist at the 1904 St. Louis World's Fair, he also exhibited at the 1900 Exposition Universelle, as well as the Venice Biennales of 1901, 1905, and 1909.

== Early years ==
Zemplényi was born in Eperjes. He became a disciple of Mihály Munkácsy and began en plein air painting. He was a student of Károly Lotz and Bertalan Székely in Budapest, then Gabriel von Hackl and Ludwig Löfftz in Munich. A graduate of the Munich Academy, in 1891, he was granted a government scholarship in Italy and also visited Paris. He worked for some time as a young man in Jarovnice (Jernye), now Slovakia, where he came into contact with Pál Szinyei Merse, surveying his "Picnic in May" painting and providing encouragement and inspiration for Szinyei.

== Career ==
On his return to Hungary, Zemplényi was a member of the free school of Szolnok for many years, and also in Nagybánya. Influenced by Bastien-Lepage, his work was characterized by what is known as "Munich Realism". In 1903, he was a professor in the Hungarian University of Fine Arts, where one of his students was Janos Viski. He was described in 1913 as an artist who "paints coast scenes and landscapes with a strong and virile touch, [is] an artist who understands the varying moods of mother earth, and has a keen understanding for the picturesque." The people he painted in his pictures tended to be those in suffering or hardship such as peasants, the poor, and beggars.

Notable paintings include Boy with Cherries (1894), Creekside with Mackerel-sky (1894), The Poor Woman´s Home (1895), Returning Home (1897–98) and Holiday (1899). His 1889 painting, In the Church, was exhibited at the 1900 Exposition Universelle in Paris. He exhibited at the 1901, 1905, and 1909 Venice Biennales; and in London in 1908. His work is included in the collections of the Budapest National Gallery.

His exhibition at the Fine Arts Society received a prize in 1900 for Zarandokno ("Pilgrims"), and he received Hungary's state grand prize, a gold medal, in 1903, for Virraszszatok es imadkozztok. He was awarded a silver medal at the 1904 St. Louis World's Fair in the US.

Zemplényi died in Budapest in 1917.
