= Werner Gutzeit =

German-Danish cubist painter

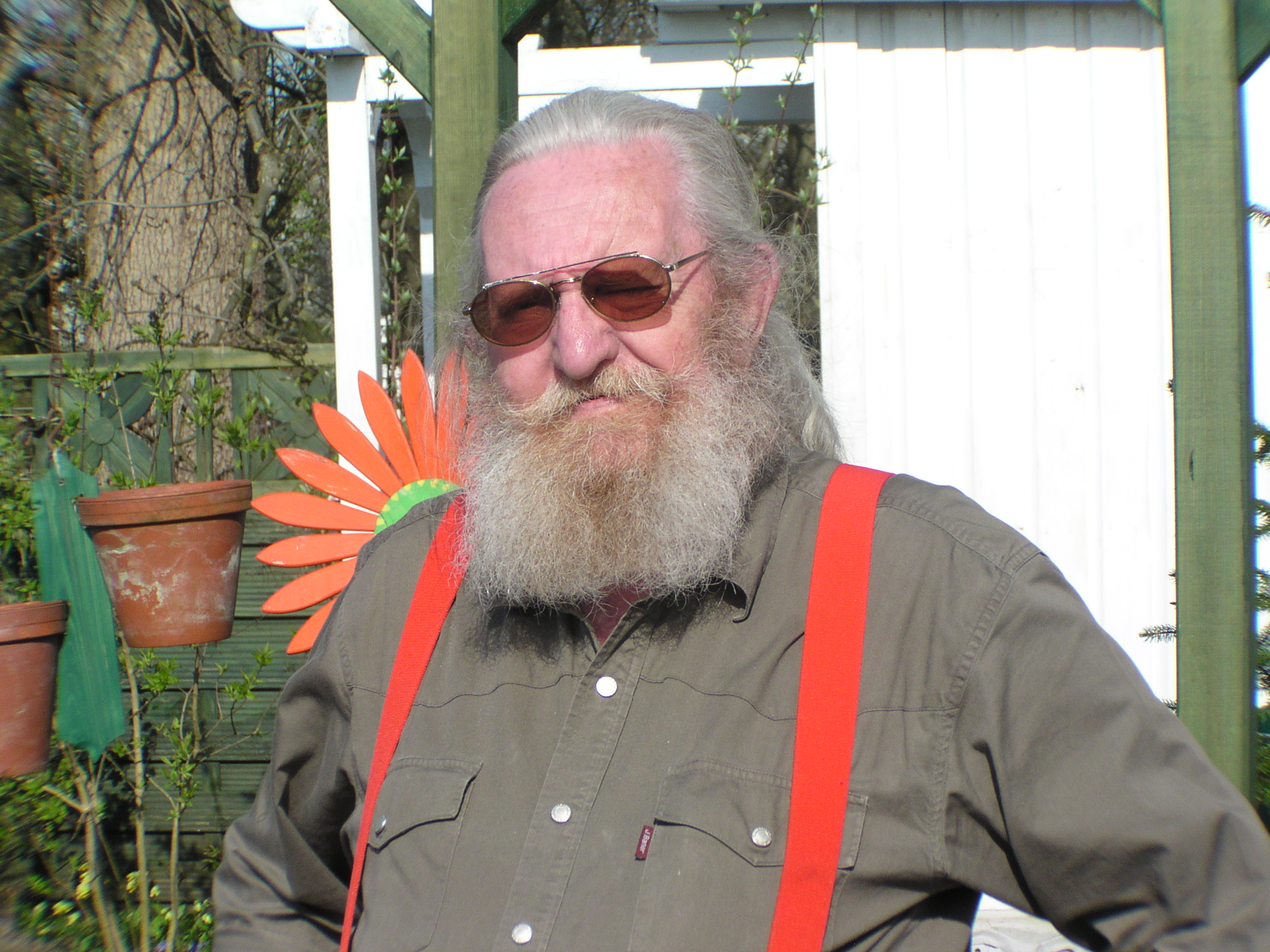
- Born: 1 December 1932; Copenhagen, Denmark
- Died: 3 August 2014 (aged 81); Lohe-Rickelshof, Germany
- Known for: Painting
- Movement: Cubism

Werner Gutzeit (1 December 1932 – 3 August 2014) was a Danish cubist painter.

Gutzeit studied arts, graphic arts, and teaching in Copenhagen. He worked as a graphic designer and educator in Denmark. He then settled in northern Germany. Starting in 1982, he worked as a freelance artist and illustrated several books as well as designing stamps and calendars for a Danish foreign mission organisation.

Werner Gutzeit preferred cubism, but he also painted modern icons and impressionistic landscapes. Many of his paintings are abstract.

His trademark since the 1950s was the "goosefish", a mythical creature which is to be found in many of his works. He designed not only reversible sculptures, but also sculptures made of clay and other materials. Other motifs that can be found in his works are harlequin, cat and pumpkin. The pumpkin symbolized for him the perfection of nature.
