= Wu Hong =

Chinese landscape painter during the Qing dynasty

Wu Hong (simplified Chinese: 吴宏; traditional Chinese: 吳宏; pinyin: Wú Hóng; Wade–Giles: Wu Hung) was a Chinese landscape painter during the Qing Dynasty (1644–1912), one of the Eight Masters of Nanjing. His years of birth and death are not known.

Wu was born in the Jiangxi province. His courtesy name was Yuandu. Wu specialized in painting landscapes and ink bamboo works.
