= Gusukuma Seihō =

Japanese artist (1614–1644)

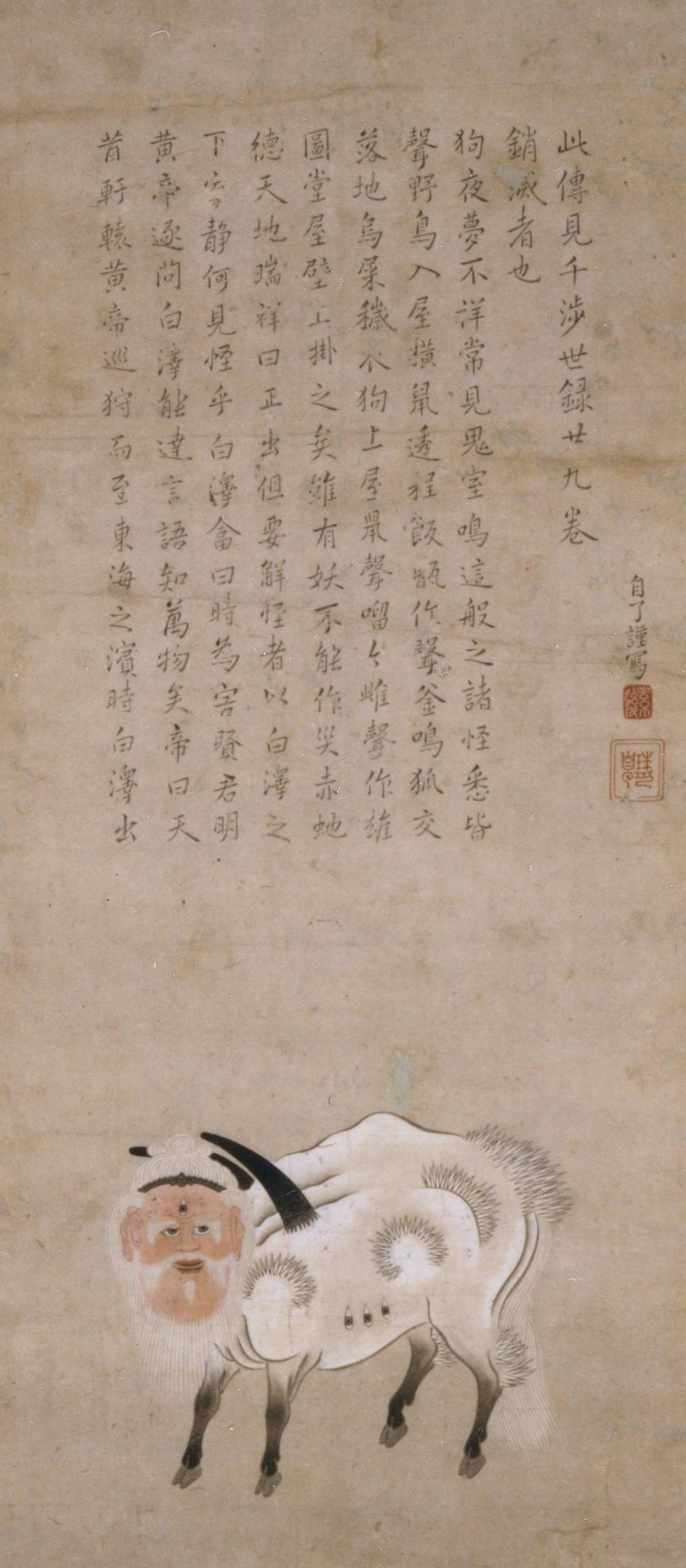
Painting of a bai ze, by Gusukuma Seihō. Okinawa Prefectural Museum. Okinawan Prefectural Important Cultural Property.

Gusukuma Seihō (城間 清豊; 19 November 1614 – 16 November 1644) was an official court painter at the royal court of the Ryūkyū Kingdom. He was also known as Ji Ryō (自了) and by the Chinese-style name Qin Kesheng (欽可聖, J: Kin Kasei).

== Life ==
Gusukuma was born to an aristocratic family in Shuri. His father was a musician, but Gusukuma was born deaf and he focused his energies in a different direction, teaching himself to paint. He sought out Chinese paintings, and was heavily influenced by them.

Hearing of the young painter, King Shō Hō called him to his court, and bestowed upon him the name Ji Ryō. It is said that the Chinese investiture envoys who witnessed his painting compared him to some of the top painters in China, and that Kanō Yasunobu, court painter for the Tokugawa shogunate, similarly praised the artist when one of Gusukuma's works was brought to Edo by the 1634 Ryukyuan envoy.

== Works ==
Most of Gusukuma's works were destroyed in the 1945 battle of Okinawa. There is only one extant work which bears a Seal (rakan) confirming it to have been painted by Gusukuma. It is held by the Okinawa Prefectural Museum, has been designated an Okinawa Prefectural Important Cultural Property, and depicts a fantastic creature known as bai ze in Chinese and hakutaku in Japanese.
