= Alex Leon =

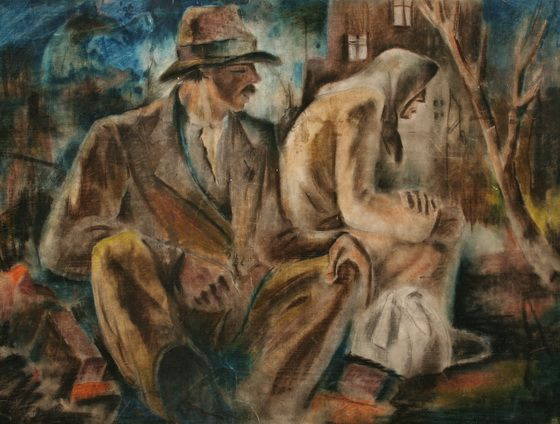
Hopeless

Alex Leon or, as he signed his pictures, Leon Alex was the pseudonym of Romanian-Hungarian graphic artist and painter Sándor Löwinger (30 May 1907 – after 8 March 1944).

== Biography ==
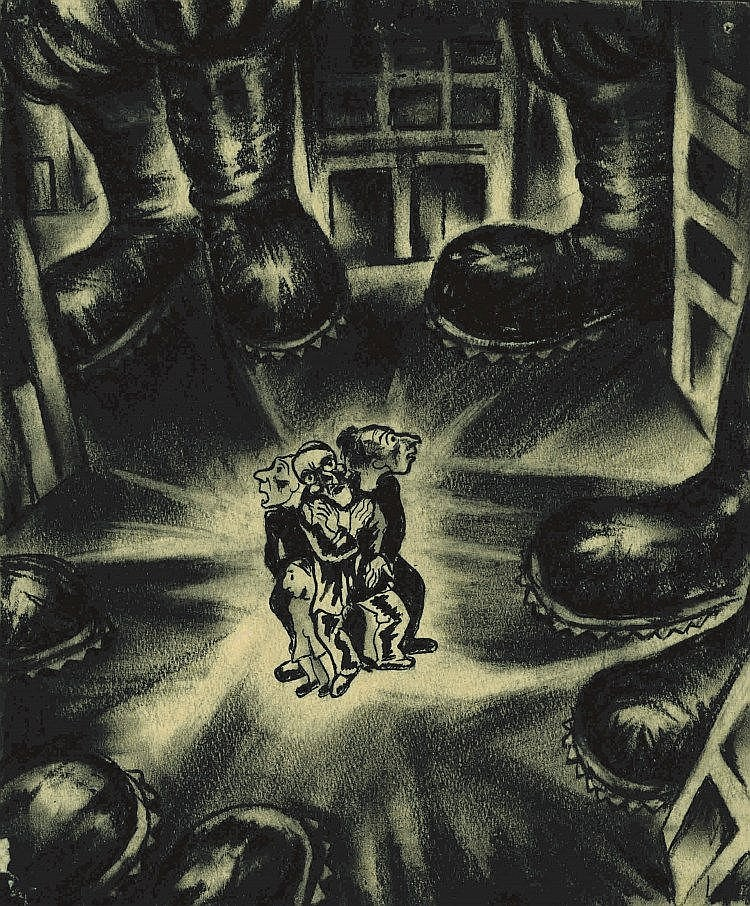
Street Scene

Alex Leon was born into a Jewish family in Petroşani, Romania, in 1907. In 1916 his family moved to Oradea, where he finished the four-year middle school in 1922. In 1923 he began a men's tailor apprenticeship, which he finished in 1926 with a certificate. Being unsatisfied with that handicraft, he began working as a lithographer in 1927. In 1928 he attended the art school in Baia Mare.

In the spring of 1930 he made his first voyage to Prague. In 1932 he moved away from his family. He had his first exposition in the journalist's club of Oradea in 1933. In 1934 he visited Prague for the second time and had expositions in Timișoara, Arad, Cluj, again in Timișoara, then in Oradea. In 1934 and 1936 two albums with his lithographs were published in Timișoara.

In 1936 he went for a longer study trip to Paris, where he became a student of the painters Lajos Tihanyi and Marc Chagall. He returned to Romania in the summer of 1939 and lived in Oradea and Brasov, but mainly in Timișoara; in August 1940 he finally settled in Oradea. In July 1942 he was deported to do slave work on the Eastern military front.

In 1943 he fell ill with typhoid-related eczema, but received no medical treatment. In January 1944 he escaped to the Soviet Union, but had to go to a hospital because of frostbitten feet. He presumably died in Ostroh, Ukraine, after 8 March 1944.

Alex Leon was an expressionist artist; his work being regarded as a tribute to the social resonances of expressionism. His biographer, István Borghida, called it "instinctive dream-painting".

== Bibliography ==
- István Borghida: Leon Alex, Kriterion Könyvkiadó, 1973
- Sándor Korvin: "Egy fiatal rajzoló látomásai" (A Young Artist's Visions), Korunk, 1935, #12.
- István Gábor: Leon Alex Párizsba készül (Leon Alex was Made for Paris), Nagyváradi Napló, 27 June 1936.
