= Fan Qi (artist) =

Chinese landscape painter

Fan Qi (Fan Ch'i, traditional: 樊圻, simplified: 樊圻; 1616–1694) was a Chinese landscape painter during the Qing dynasty (1644–1912), one of the Eight Masters of Nanjing. His specific years of birth and death are unknown.

Fan was born in Jiangning in the Jiangsu province. His style name was 'Huigong'. Fan specialized in paintings of landscapes, flowers, and human figures.
