= Vilmos Aba-Novák =

Hungarian painter and graphic artist (1894–1941)

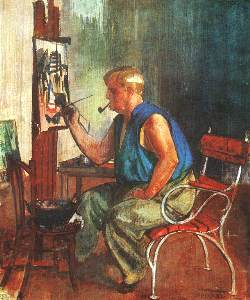
Self-portrait

Vilmos Aba-Novák (Hungarian: Aba-Novák Vilmos, until 1912: Hungarian: Novák Vilmos; March 15, 1894 – September 29, 1941) was a Hungarian painter and graphic artist. He was an original representative of modern art in his country, and specifically of its modern monumental painting. He was also the celebrated author of frescoes and church murals at Szeged and Budapest, and was officially patronized by the Hungarian nobility.

As a fresco painter, he completed numerous state and church commissions (for example: the frescoes of the Roman catholic church in Jászszentandrás, the Heroes' Gate in Szeged, the frescoes of the Szent István mausoleum in Székesfehérvár) in 1937 he won the World Exhibition in Paris, in 1940 the XXII. Grand Prize of the Venice Biennale. Seeing his pictures at the Paris exhibition, Pablo Picasso asked: "Who is this barbarian genius?"

The virtuoso style of his late paintings incorporated elements of expressionism and the formal language of the Italian Novecento. It is characterized by dynamic compositions painted with loud colors, inspired by monuments; his favorite subject was the world of the village fair and the circus. He used a brilliant technique to evoke the life of the people of the Great Plains - not without caricaturistic elements. His pictures are preserved in the Hungarian National Gallery and other public collections, as well as in many private collections.

== Biography ==
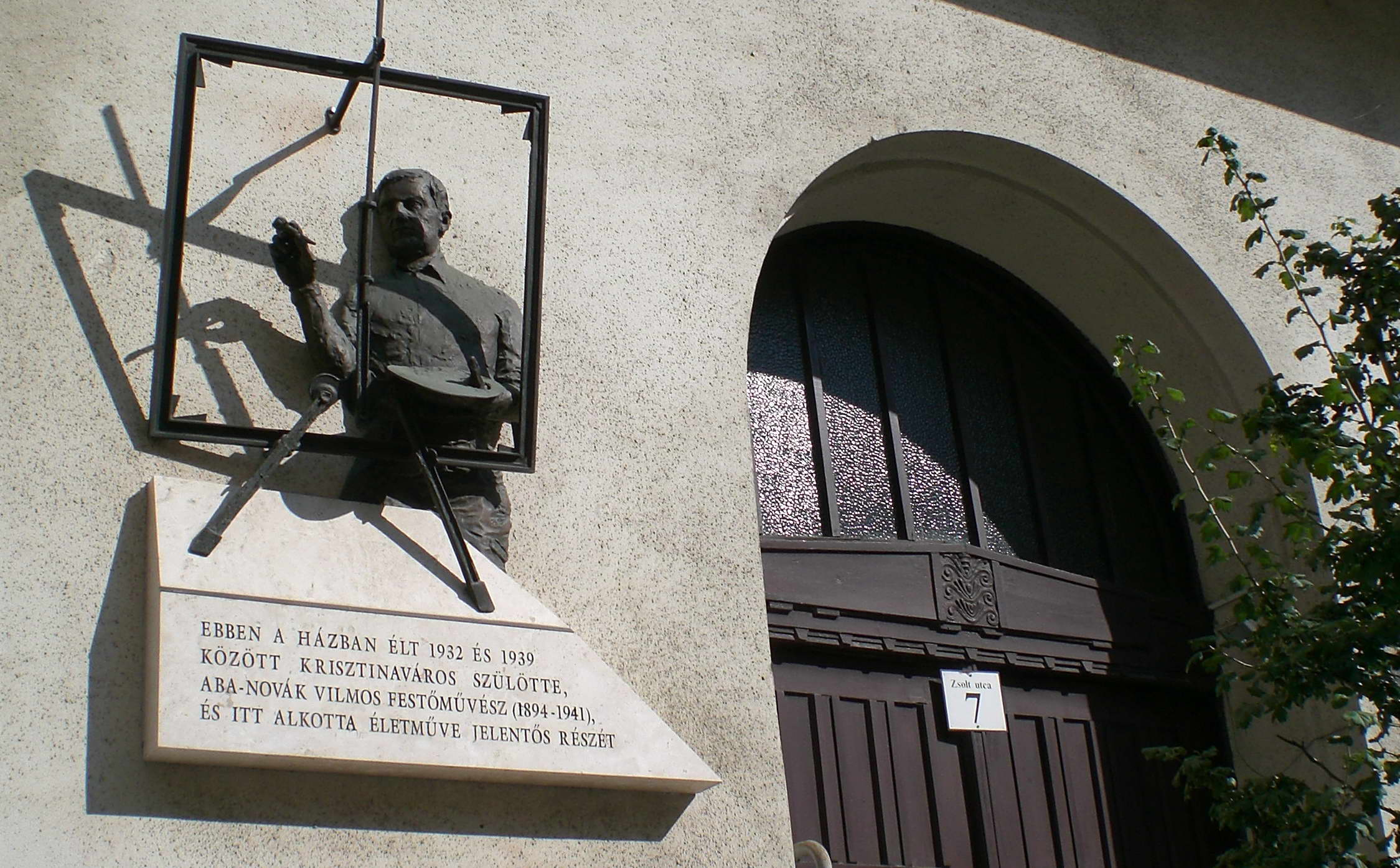
Aba-Novák's home Budapest, Zsolt utca 7

Novák was born in Budapest, Hungary, where he would also die. His father was Gyula Novák of Czech-Hungarian origin, and the mother was Róza Waginger (Hungarian: Waginger Róza) born in Vienna. His original full name was: Zsigmond Vilmos József Novák. His siblings: Gyula Novák and Mária Novák. He lived his childhood in Krisztinaváros and started going to the flea market at an early age, where he bought drawing tools.

After studying at the Art School until 1912, he began work under Adolf Fényes. Between 1912 and 1914, Novák studied at the College of Fine Arts in Budapest. His studies, which had barely begun, were interrupted by the war, and in October 1914 he enlisted in the 29th Home Guard Regiment. He received numerous awards, however, according to his diary, he considered the war to be completely pointless and an obstacle to his artistic ambitions. He got wounded, his right arm remained paralyzed for a long time. Completing his service in the Austro-Hungarian Army on the Eastern Front during World War I, he took up drawing with Viktor Olgyai.

Between 1921 and 1923, he spent his summers with the group of artists in Szolnok and Baia Mare (Nagybánya), Romania (see Baia Mare School), and was first exhibited in 1924. He was sent by the Hungarian Academy as a Fellow on a scholarship to Rome (1928 and 1930).

In 1925, he moved to Zugliget with his wife and model, Kato, and in the summer he painted with Károly Patkó in Felsőbánya. He won the five million kroner foreign travel award of the Pál Szinyei Merse Society. In 1926, at the first Spring Exhibition in the National Salon, he won the grand prize of the Szinyei Merse Pál Society for graphics with his etching Girolamo Savonarola. In May, he organized a trip abroad, on the Venice-Verona-Milan-Bern-Paris route. He painted in Felsőbánya in the summer.

In 1928, he was elected one of the members of the Pál Merse Szinyei Society and became a teacher at the Free School of Fine Arts in Belváros. They moved to 54 Margit körút in Buda. From that year on, he appeared every time at the Venice Biennale. He became a member of the Munkácsy guild. His daughter Judit was born, and in the summer she painted again in Igal.

In 1929-30, he was a scholarship recipient of the Hungarian Academy in Rome for 14 months.

From 1930, he constantly returned to the Szolnok artist colony. He painted many genre and landscape paintings. It was exhibited for the first time in the Tamás Gallery. Between 1930 and 1937, he ran a private art school.

In 1931, he presented his material painted in Rome at the Ernst Museum. He organized collective exhibitions in Milan, Genoa, Bergamo, and Trieste. The picture "The Farewell to the Ferry on the Tisza" was purchased by the Museum of Modern Art in New York. He participated in the first group exhibition of the scholarship holders in Rome.

In 1932, he won a gold medal at the Ecclesiastical Art Exhibition in Padua, and his picture "Flood" exhibited in the Fränkel Szalon in Budapest received the capital's grand prize.

In 1934, he exhibited in London and participated in the II. Mostra Internazionale D'Arte Sacra exhibition. In this year, he founded the American-Hungarian Art Academy.

In 1935, he had American exhibitions with Béla Iványi-Grünwald. 1936 is the year of birth of the paintings of the Heroes' Gate in Szeged (with Henrik Stefan, Mihály Patay and János Rozs). That year he appeared in Chicago and organized a collection exhibition at the Fränkel Gallery. The III. His picture The Apotheosis of Hungarian Work was featured at the Milan Triennale.

Aba Novák painted many frescoes for the Roman Catholic Church of Jászszentandrás, and Hősök Kapuja (Heroes' Gate - a rare Hungarian example of novecento architecture, commemorating World War I soldiers) in Szeged in 1936 (the latter was white-washed after 1945, restored between 1986 and 2000), and painted many commissions for the Hungarian government. Aba also worked on frescoes of the St. Stephen's Mausoleum in Székesfehérvár and on the Church in Városmajor, Budapest, in 1938. The jury's Grand Prize at the Paris World Exhibition in 1937 and the 1940 Venice Biennale were both awarded to him.

He was a teacher at the College of Fine Arts from 1939 until his death.
