= Márta Lacza =

Hungarian graphic artist and painter

- Lacza Márta
- Born: December 2, 1946; Csepel, Budapest, Hungary
- Died: August 23, 2025 (aged 78); Budapest, Hungary
- Education: Hungarian Academy of Fine Arts
- Known for: Painting, Illustration
- Spouse: Dékány Ágoston (artist)
- Awards: Munkácsy Prize; 1983

Márta Lacza (December 2, 1946 – August 23, 2025) was a Hungarian graphic artist and portrait painter.

== Early life and education ==
She was born in the Csepel district of Budapest in 1946. In 1967, she graduated from Fine Arts High School and then studied from 1970 to 1974 at the Hungarian Academy of Fine Arts under Simon Sarkantyú and Károly Raszler. Since then, she has had numerous solo exhibitions at home and abroad, and her works have been shown in London, Hamburg, Eindhoven, Ghent, Copenhagen and Athens.

== Scholarship ==
She was awarded a Derkovits Scholarship (1980–1983) and won the Munkácsy Prize in 1983. A 40-minute television programme about her, titled A Tv galériája. Lacza Márta grafikusművész (The TV gallery. Lacza Martha graphic artist), was broadcast on Magyar Televízió, the Hungarian national public broadcaster, in March 1982.

She took part in the first "Frans Masereel Rijkscentrum voor graphite" international graphic artists' colony in Belgium, and was called back every year for fourteen years. She also participated in the work of Atelier Nord in Norway.

== Career ==
She is known for her oil paintings, drawings in pencil or chalk, etchings and illustrations for many books. Her work is described as combining mood, thought creativity and personal vision with "unmatched skill and preparedness coupled with outstanding craftmanship". Her paintings show "mysterious, sometimes almost bizarre figures" that "provoke emotion from observers."

Her illustrations have been published in a number of books, including the Hungarian translation of the Anne of Green Gables series of children's books by Lucy Maud Montgomery translated by Katalin Szűr-Szabó, and books of Hungarian folktales such as The Silver King's Flute by Zsigmond Móricz, and The Tree That Reached the Sky. She and her husband also illustrated academic volumes such as Hajdú-Bihar megye 10-11. századi sírleletei, and The late neolithic of the Tisza region (1987).

Her autobiography, Élet és Művészet (Life and Art), was published in Budapest in 2007.

She and her husband, artist Dékány Ágoston (died 28 August 2015) first met in 1963 and both studied at the Budapest Fine Arts High School. They married in 1975, and lived and worked in the Csepel district of Budapest. Lacza died of natural causes at the age of 78 on August 23, 2025, in Budapest, Hungary.

== Solo exhibitions ==
Her solo exhibitions include:

- 1975 Joseph Municipal Culture House, Budapest
- 1976 Purple School, New Palace, Budapest
- 1978 Studio Gallery, Budapest
- 1979 Pesterzsébeti Museum, Budapest
- 1980 Chili Gallery, Budapest
- 1981 Theatre Gallery, Budapest
- 1982 TV Gallery, Budapest; Culture House, Siófok; Turnhout, Belgium
- 1983 Bastion Gallery, Budapest; Fórum Szálloda; Galerie Mensch, Hamburg
- 1984 Miskolc; Fórum Galéria, Budapest
- 1985 Turnhout, Belgium
- 1990 Elizabeth City Gallery, Budapest
- 1995 Color Games

== Works ==
Works acquired by the Janus Pannonius Múzeum:

- Négy évszak, pen/ink on paper, 275 × 402 mm
- Tópart, 1978, lithography on paper, 475 × 570 mm
- Belső udvar, pencil on paper, 312 × 440 mm
- Arcuk egy-egy kis külváros, 1980, p. szín. cer, 370 × 545 mm
- Információ, pencil on paper, 370 × 550 mm
- Szólíthatom Jánosnak? , pencil on paper, 395 × 550 mm
- Pára, pencil on paper, 385 × 545 mm
- Félsziget, 1984, pencil on paper, 340 × 510 mm
- Túlsó part, pencil on paper, 280 × 395 mm

Other works include:

- Autóbusz
- Félnyolc
- Gyere be
- Gyógygödör
- Gyógyvíz
- Mester
- Madarak
- Merengő
- Katyiba
- Piac
- Szőrmekereskedő
- Tükör
- Habok
- Najádok
- Harmadosztály (1985)
- Ködös történetek (1986)
- Küszöb (1988)
- Ginkgo biloba (1992)
