= Márta Kucsora =

Hungarian painter

- Born: 1979 (age 46–47); Szeged, Hungary
- Education: Hungarian University of Fine Arts; Montclair State University
- Known for: contemporary abstract painting
- Website: https://www.kucsora.com

Márta Kucsora (Hungary 1979) is a contemporary artist, known primarily for her large-scale abstract paintings. Kucsora had solo shows at Galerie Melbye-Konan (Hamburg, Germany), Postmasters Gallery, the Kalman Maklary Fine Arts, the Kunsthalle in Budapest (Hungary) and the Kepes Institute (Eger, Hungary). She was included in museum shows at 21C Museum Bentonville, Hungarian National Gallery and Ernst Museum. In 2006, she co-founded the Budapest Art Factory and runs an International Artist Residency Program there.

== Education ==
Kucsora graduated with a Masters of Fine Arts degree (MFA) from the Hungarian University of Fine Arts, and also attended Montclair State University’s MFA program (2005-2006).

== Works ==
Marta Kucsora

Magda Sawon describes Kucsora’s works as heavily influenced by twentieth-century female artists, describing her art as "Resonating across time with Pollock's action, Frankenthaler's fluidity, 1980's Richter's abstract spatiality, and contemporary gestural abstraction's referentiality, Kucsora's update of brushless action paintings invariably reflects the performative process of their making. With a Polke-like penchant for experimentation, Kucsora expands her materialist repertoire of painterly media in her chemical "kitchen."

In 2021, Kucsora presented her ten most significant works at Postmasters Gallery, New York. Her works highlighted the special use of materials, and her so-called continuous technique.

== Solo exhibitions (Selection) ==
- 2023 - Melody in Abstraction, CoBrA Gallery, Shanghai, China - with Jiahua Qian
- 2023 - Monumentalis, Galerie Melbye-Konan, Hamburg, Germany
- 2023 - Questo Caos del Tempo, Postmasters Roma, Rome, Italy - with Sophie Ko
- 2022 - Budapest Flow, Patricia Low Contemporary, Gstaad, Switzerland
- 2022 - Stretch, Kepes Institute, Eger, Hungary
- 2021 - Metaverse, Kálmán Makláry Fine Arts, Budapest, Hungary
- 2021 - Inception, Through Shaping Material, Kunsthalle, Budapest, Hungary
- 2020 - Super Natural, Postmasters Gallery, New York, United States
- 2019 - An Abstract World, Galerie Benjamin Eck, Munich, Germany
- 2018 - all-over, Kálmán Makláry Fine Arts, Budapest, Hungary
- 2017 - Viscosity, The Concept Space, London, United Kingdom
- 2017 - Imprints, Kálmán Makláry Fine Arts, Budapest, Hungary

== Group exhibitions (Selection) ==
- 2023 - Contemporary Budapest, Kálmán Makláry Fine Arts, Budapest, Hungary
- 2023 - Organic - As Time Awakens, Deji Art Museum, Nanjing, China
- 2021 - Personal / Fresh, Kunsthalle, Budapest, Hungary
- 2020 - Blue - Color of Infinity, Kálmán Makláry Fine Arts, Budapest, Hungary
- 2020 - Artonomy, Kunsthalle, Budapest, Hungary
- 2018 - Rendition, The Concept Space, London, United Kingdom
- 2015 - Blue: Matter, Mood and Melancholy, 21c Museum, Bentonville, Arizona, United States
- 2015 - Here and Now, Kunsthalle, Budapest, Hungary
- 2014 - Plantagram, Klettgau Galerie, Klettgau-Griessen, Germany
- 2014 - Surrealität, Galerie Reichlin, Küssnacht am Rigi, Switzerland

== Art Fairs and Biennials (Selection) ==
- 2023 - Binálé, Kristály Színtér, Curated by Viola Lukács, Péter Weiler, Julia Neudold, Budapest, Hungary
- 2023 - Design Miami / Podium x Shanghai, CoBrA Gallery, Shanghai, China
- 2022 - West Bund Art&Design, CoBrA Gallery, Shanghai, China
- 2020 - BRAFA Art Fair, Kálmán Makláry Fine Arts, Brussels, Belgium
- 2019 - BRAFA Art Fair, Kálmán Makláry Fine Arts, Brussels, Hungary
- 2019 - Art Karlsruhe, Kálmán Makláry Fine Arts, Germany
- 2018 - Art Paris Art Fair, Kálmán Makláry Fine Arts, Grand Palais, Paris, France
- 2018 - BRAFA Art Fair, Kálmán Makláry Fine Arts, Brussels
- 2017 - Masterpiece Fair, Kálmán Makláry Fine Arts, London, United Kingdom
- 2016 - ART Innsbruck, Alludo Room Gallery, Austria
- 2016 - Affordable Art Fair, Alludo Room Gallery, Milan, Italy
- 2015 - Viennafair, Budapest Art Factory, Vienna, Austria
- 2015 - Art Market Budapest, Galerie Martin Mertens, Budapest, Hungary

== Publications ==
- 2023 - Márta Kucsora, Galerie Melbye-Konan, Hamburg, Germany
- 2021 - Márta Kucsora, Kálmán Makláry Fine Arts, Budapest, Hungary
- 2021 - Personal, Fresh (ISBN 978-615-5695-45-2), Kunsthalle Budapest / Mucsarnok, 2021, Budapest, Hungary
- 2007 - Direct Pictures (ISBN 978-963-7032-34-9), Ernst Múzeum, Budapest, Hungary
- 2007 - Time of Painting (ISBN 978-963-7432-95-8), Magyar Nemzeti Galéria, Budapest, Hungary
- 2007 - Artonomy (ISBN 978-615-5695-31-5) Mucsarnok, 2007, Budapest

== Artworks in private and public collections ==
- Die Mobiliar Art Collection, Switzerland
- MNB, Hungarian National Bank, Hungary
- Deji Art Museum, Nanjing, China
- 21C Museum, Louisville, KY, US
- ERSTE BANK, Hungary
- Ruhrverband, Essen, Germany
- Erftverband, Bergheim, Germany
- Wasserverband Eifel-Rur, Düren, Germany
- Sammlung Lupa, Germany

== Press (Selection) ==
- 2023 - Schnabel Kultur-Blog, Michaela Schnabel: Hamburg – „Márta Kucsora“ – ein energetisches Erlebnis in der Galerie Melbye-Konan
- 2023 - Papageno, Alexandra Ivanoff: A tour of the Budapest Art Factory: a dynamic community
- 2023 - Streifzug, Galerie Melbye-Konan präsentiert Monumentalis
- 2023 - The Dreaming Machine, Camilla Boemio: Monumentalis. An aesthetical alchemist: Camilla Boemio interviews Marta Kucsora
- 2023 - Shoutout LA, Meet Marta Kucsora
- 2022 - Papageno, Alexandra Ivanoff: Márta Kucsora’s “Stretch” in Eger’s Kepes Intézet
- 2022 - Hype&Hyper, Éva Tomanicz: Márta Kucsora exhibition opened in Eger
- 2022 - Népszava, P. Szabó Dénes: Reakcióba lépő anyagok
- 2021 - Forbes, László Bagi: Menő New York-i galériában volt kiállítása, Amerikában is befuthat a magyar festőművész
- 2021 - Roadster, Ariel Provaznik: Eljutni arra a pontra, amikor felkerülsz a térképre
- 2019 - Culture Trip, Alex Mackintosh: Artist Márta Kucsora Talks Hungarian Art and Where To See It in Budapest
