= Lili Árkayné Sztehló =

Hungarian artist (1897–1959)

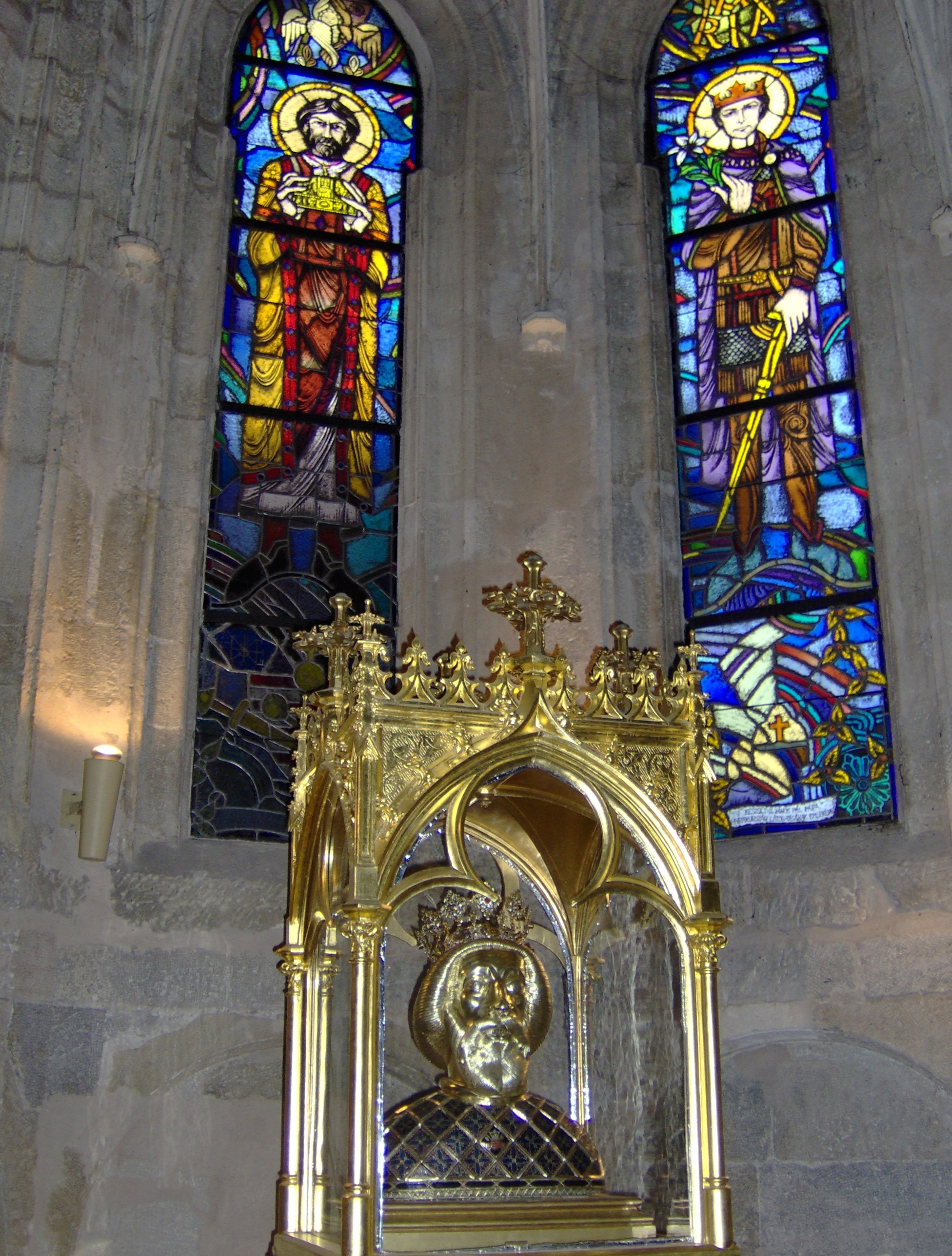
Painted windows of Lili Árkayné Sztehló in the Héderváry Chapel (Győr Cathedral) and the Reliquary of Ladislaus I of Hungary

Lili Árkayné Sztehló (7 November 1897 – 28 October 1959 in Budapest) was a Hungarian painter and artist, wife of Bertalan Árkay, best known for her stained glass window paintings in parish churches and cathedrals throughout Hungary.

== Biography ==
She graduated from the Academy of Fine Arts studying under Lajos Deák Ébner, János Vaszary and Oszkár Glatz in 1923, later making scholarly trips to Rome and Paris. Initially, she was successful with her oil paintings, but by her late 20s she had become productive mainly in the field of ceramics and glass painting. Some of her works include the glass windows of the City Hall of Mohács commemorating the Battle of Mohács (1927), the painted glass windows of the Pasarét Church and Heart of Jesus Church in Városmajor in Budapest (1932) and of the Gyárváros Church in Győr (1929), the window of St. Stephen's Mausoleum in Székesfehérvár (1938), the glass windows of the inner city church of Pécs (1943), and of the St. Michael's Cathedral in Veszprém (1954). Air raids during the Second World War caused damage to these works.

Árkayné Sztehló participated in a number of national and foreign applied arts exhibitions, including Monza in 1930, Rome in 1934, winning gold medals and the Grand Prix. In 1937 she exhibited at the Exposition Internationale des Arts et Techniques dans la Vie Moderne in Paris. She exhibited in 1940 at the Triennale di Milano stained glass depicting Elizabeth of Hungary.

She died in 1959.

== Her art ==
Sztehlo was a significant figure in the creation of the colored window in her era. The nature of the material, because of the saturation of the color by the sunlight, guided her thought processes. Sztehlo took inspiration from famous painters of the Middle Ages, and she laid out the object she wants to depict from colored glass pieces and formed the lines of the drawing from the lead holder connecting the glass pieces. The procedure requires the artist to renounce the representation of space structured according to the laws of perspective, to build their compositions flat and to simplify the lines of their drawing to the last detail.

The creation of the windows of the church in Városmajor was delayed for several years starting in 1932, and more than once the public pushed back against the installation of Sztehlo's work.

Sztehlo's art changed by the post-war era. In her compositions with biblical subjects, she constructed scenes with human and angelic characters from sacred stories in a similar way to the narrative mood of medieval glass artists, and her method changed from abstract geometric forms as decoration to trees, flowers and birds.

Apart from Budapest, there are some of Sztehlo's works scattered all over Transdanubia, and one reached the Great Plain in 1959.

== Stained glass windows in the Galyatető Roman Catholic Church ==
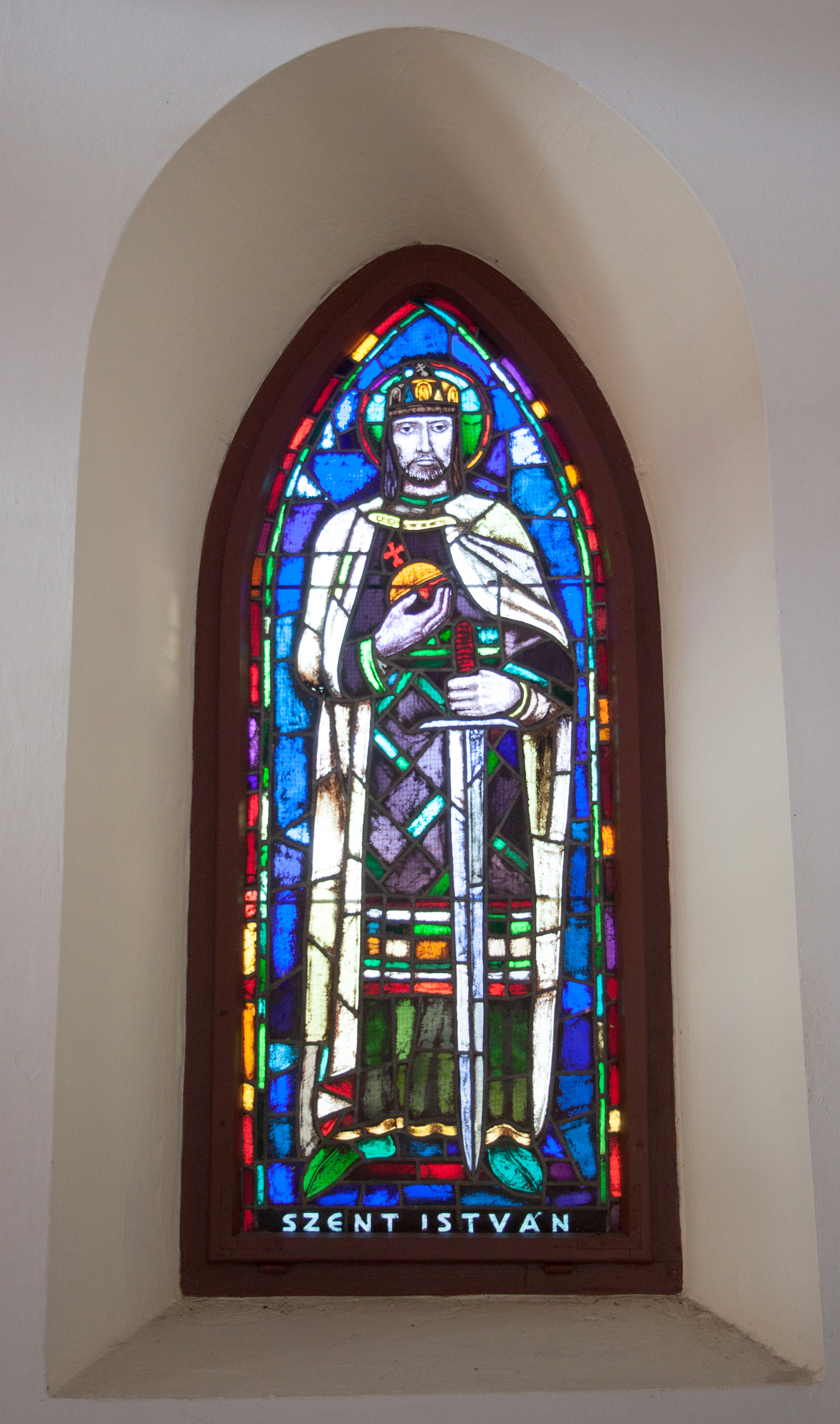
Stephen I of Hungary

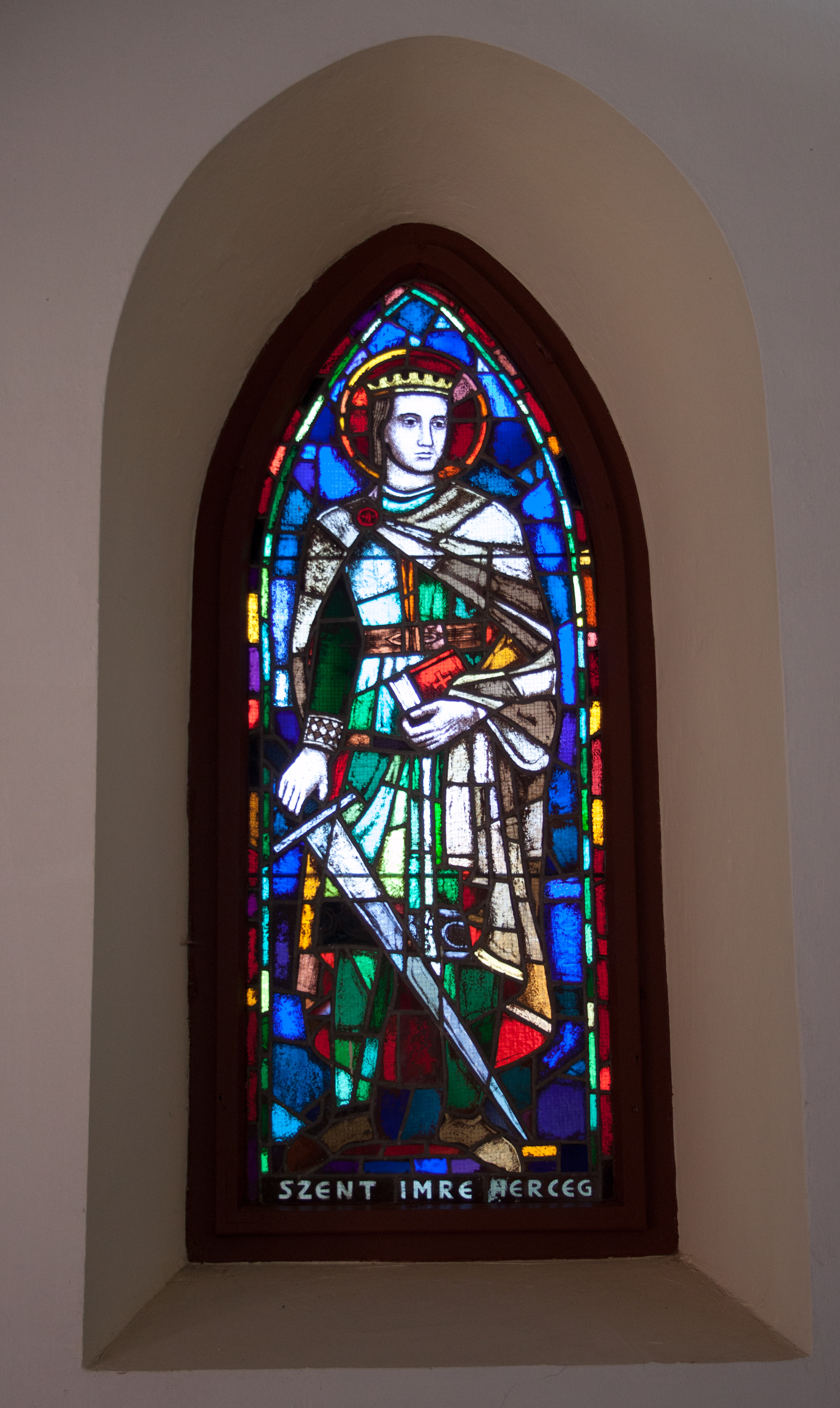
Saint Emeric of Hungary

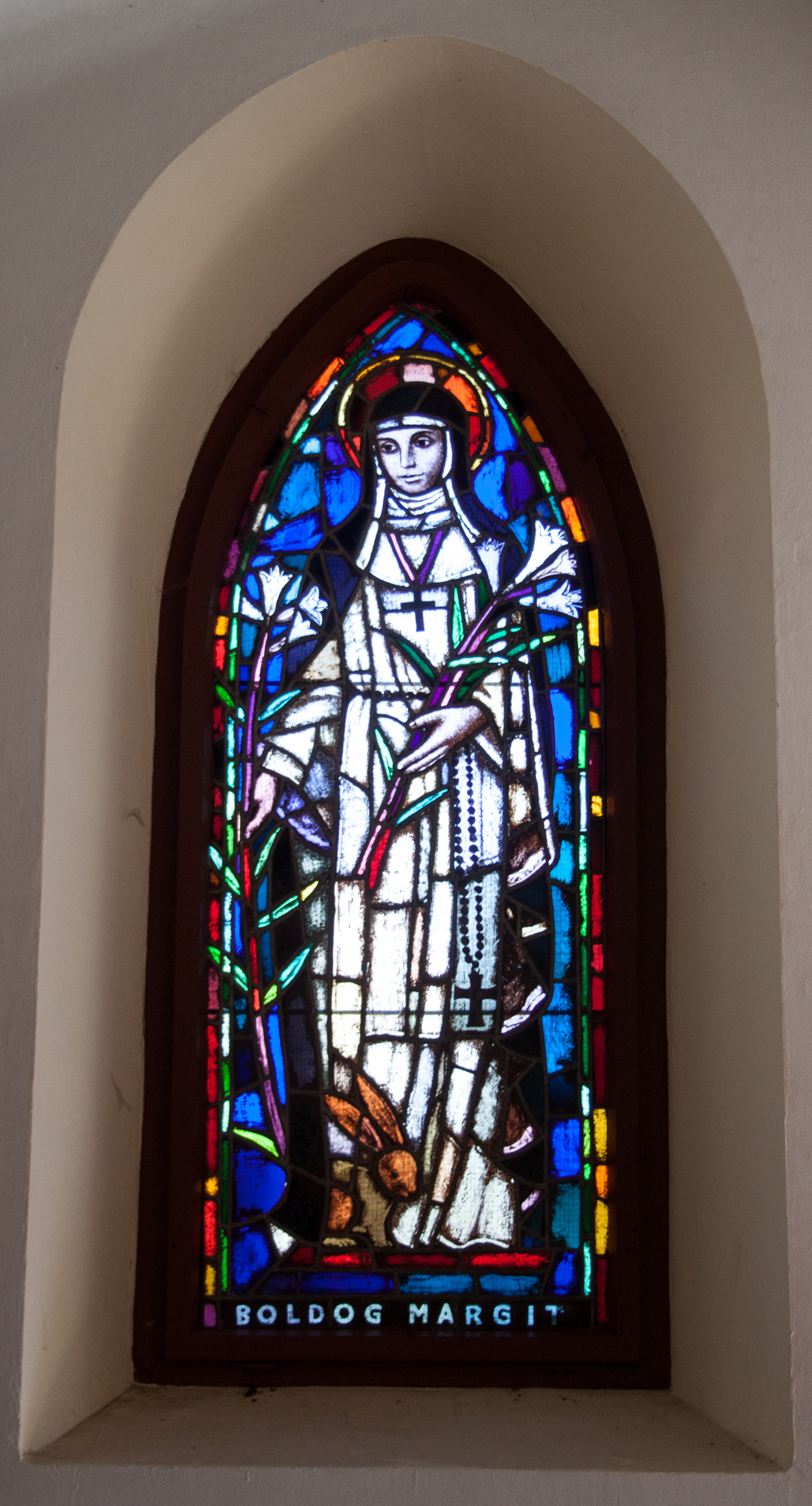
Saint Margaret of Hungary

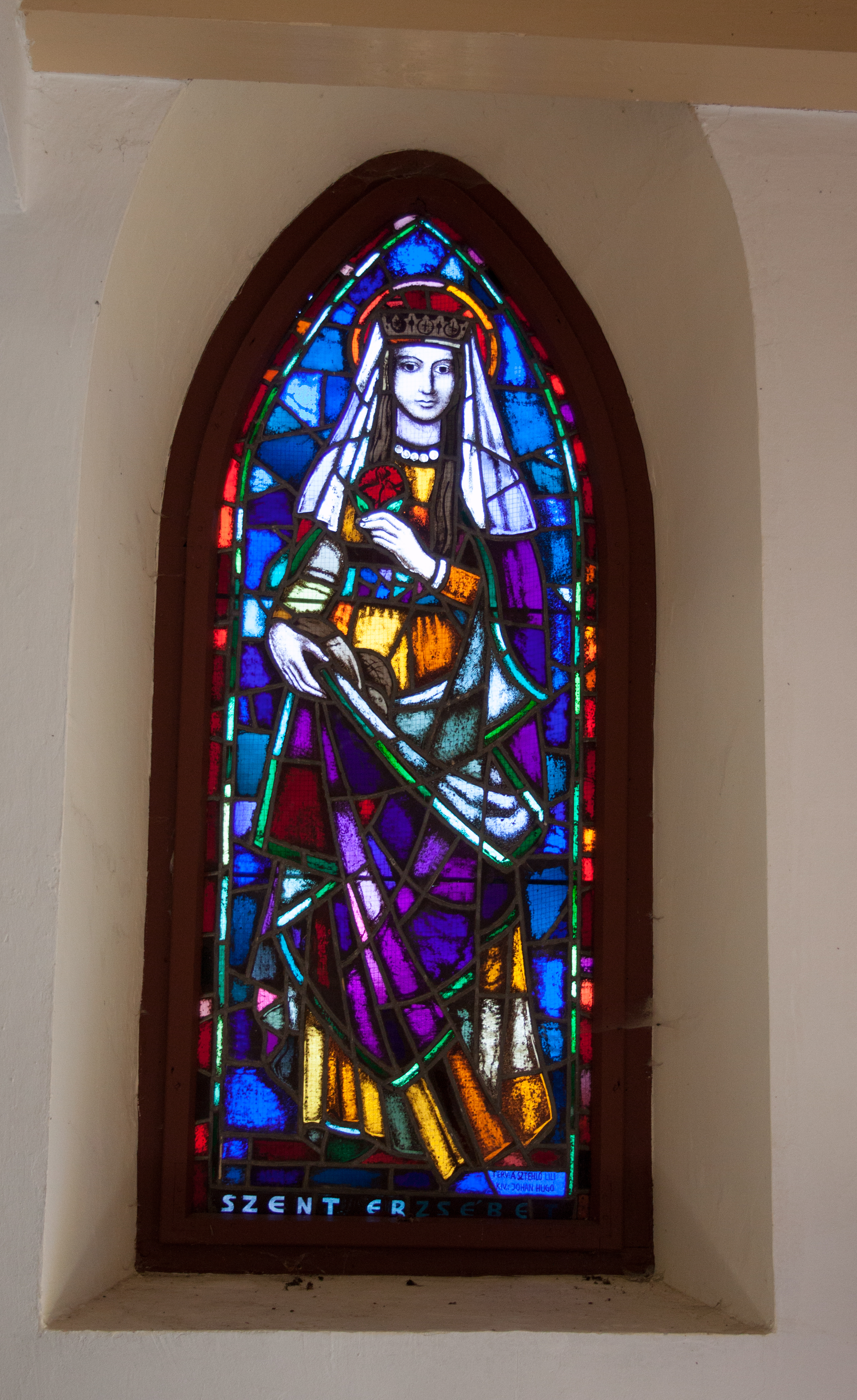
Elizabeth of Hungary

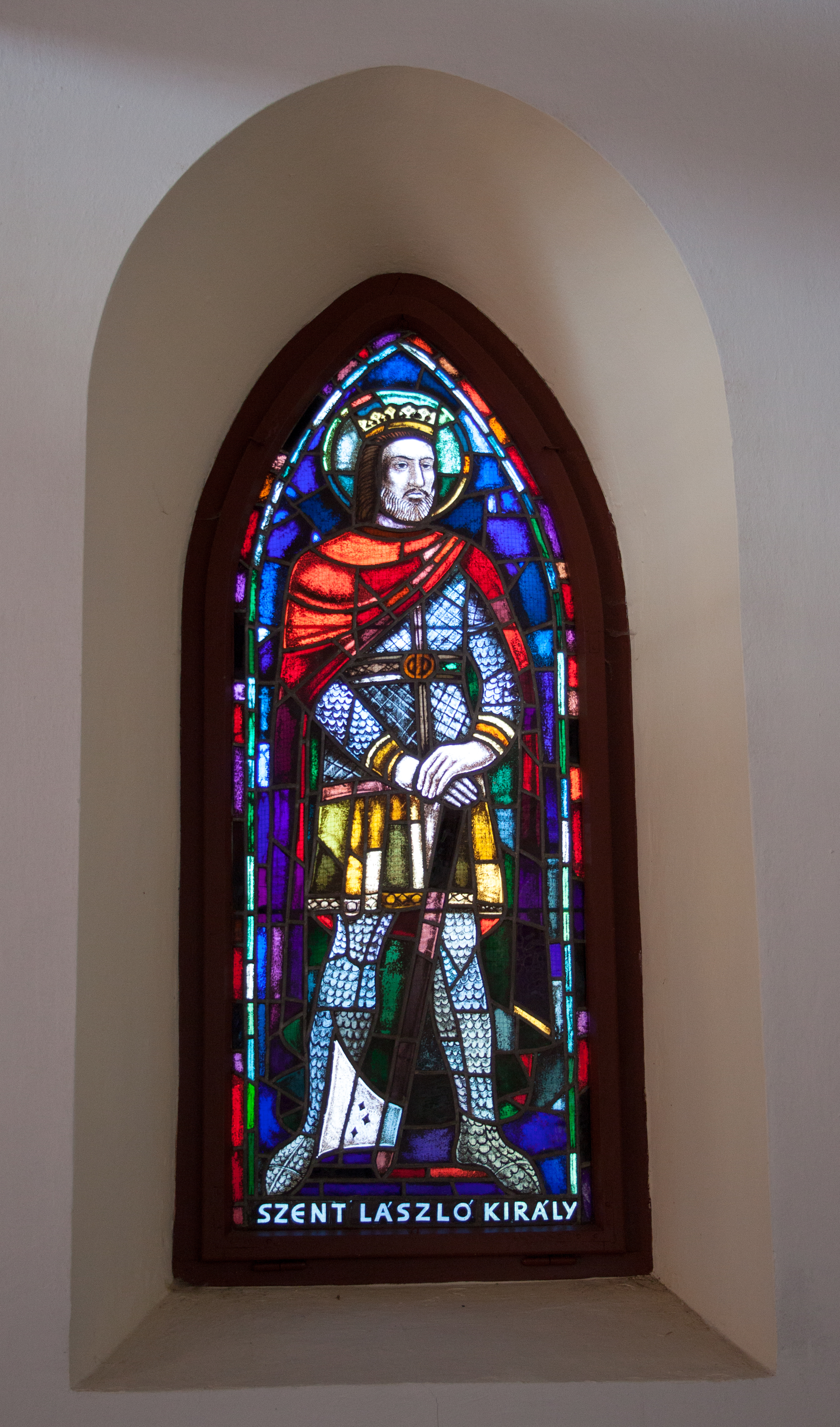
Ladislaus I of Hungary

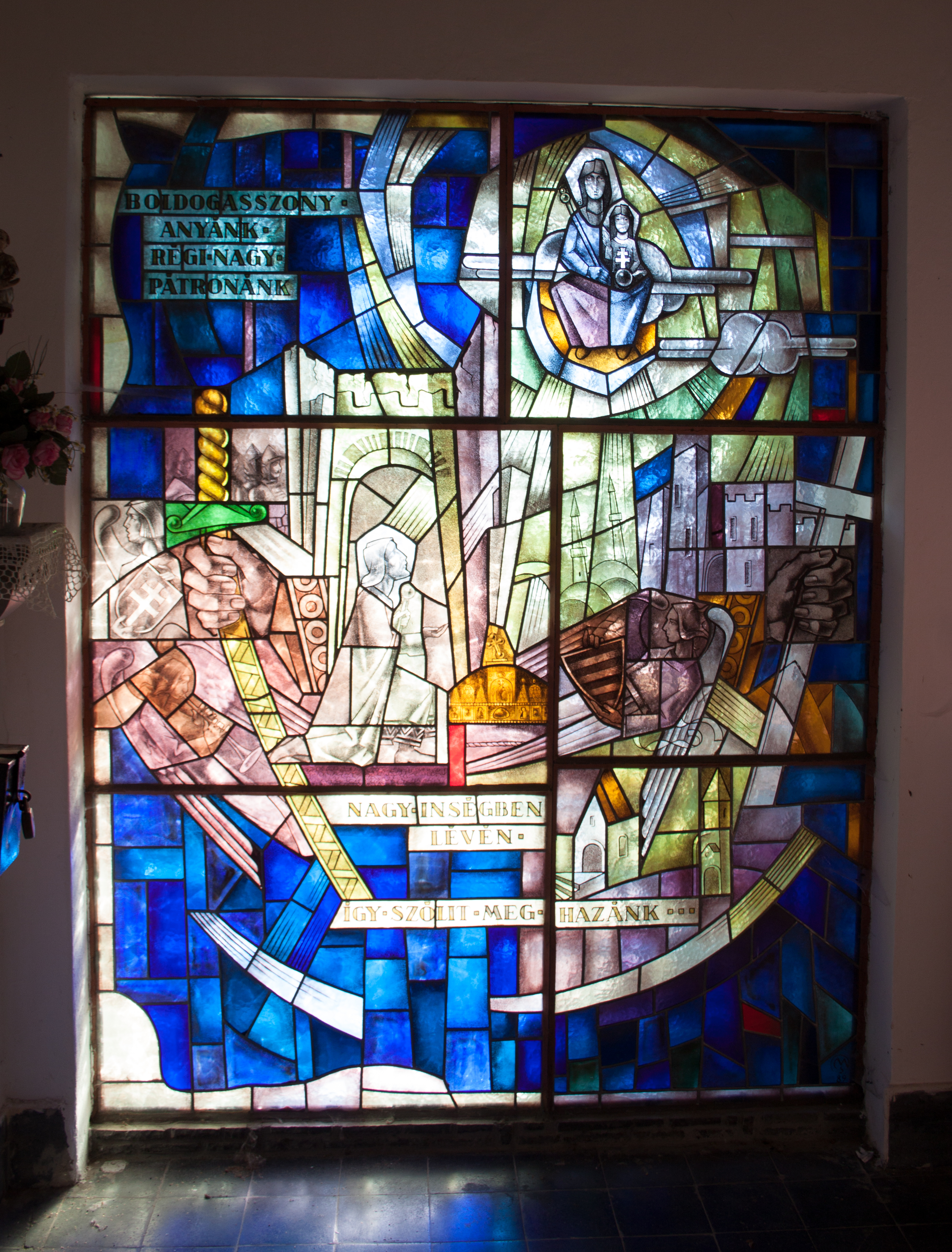
Stained glass window

== Sources ==
- Biography of Lili Árkayné Sztehló on artportal
