= Líviusz Gyulai =

Hungarian graphic designer (1937–2021)

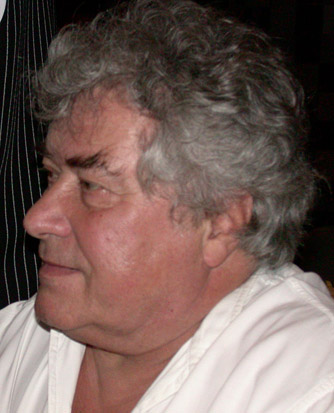
Líviusz Gyulai

Líviusz Gyulai (December 2, 1937 – March 16, 2021) was a Hungarian graphic artist, printmaker, illustrator.

== Biography ==
Born at Baraolt (Barót), Covasna County, Transylvania, Romania, he graduated from the Academy of Fine Arts of Budapest as graphic artist in 1962. He is known as a printmaker and a book illustrator as well. He was awarded a gold medal at the Florence Graphic Biennale in 1970. He has been making animated films since 1975. He joined Pannonia Film Studio in 1973. He has won several awards with his animations. Jónás was awarded in 1999 at the Cannes Film Festival. Gyulai got the Munkácsy Prize in 1973 and for his life's work he got the Kossuth Prize in 2004.

== Animated films ==
- Delfinia (1976)
- Új lakók ("New Tenants") (1977)
- Jómadarak ("Bad Eggs") (1977) - A TV series
- Tinti kalandjai ("The Adventures of Tinti") (1987–88) - An award-winning TV series granted the Award for the Category of TV Series for the episode entitled "Nagy verseny" ("The Grand Competition") at the 1993 Kecskemét Animation Film Festival (KAFF).
- Jónás ("Jonah") (1997)
- Golyós mese ("Spun") (1999)
- Szinbád, bon voyage! ("Sinbad Bon Voyage!") (2000) - Winner of the 2002 KAFF Special Awards of Film and TV Critics together with Az én kis városom
- Az én kis városom ("The Small Town of Mine") (2002) - Winner of the 2002 KAFF Special Awards of Film and TV Critics together with Szinbád, bon voyage!
- Könny nem marad szárazon ("Tears won't stay dry") (2004)
- Egy komisz kölyök naplója / Fifi ("A Bad Boy's Diary / Fifi") (2013) - Winner of 2013 KAFF Award in the Category of Best TV-Series

== Death ==
Gyulai was hospitalized in Budapest on 5 March 2021, because of a COVID-19-related illness during the COVID-19 pandemic in Hungary. He died on 16 March 2021.
