= Bertalan Árkay =

Bertalan Árkay (Budapest, 11 April 1901 – Budapest, 23 November 1971) was a pioneer of Hungarian modernist design and architecture.

== Career ==
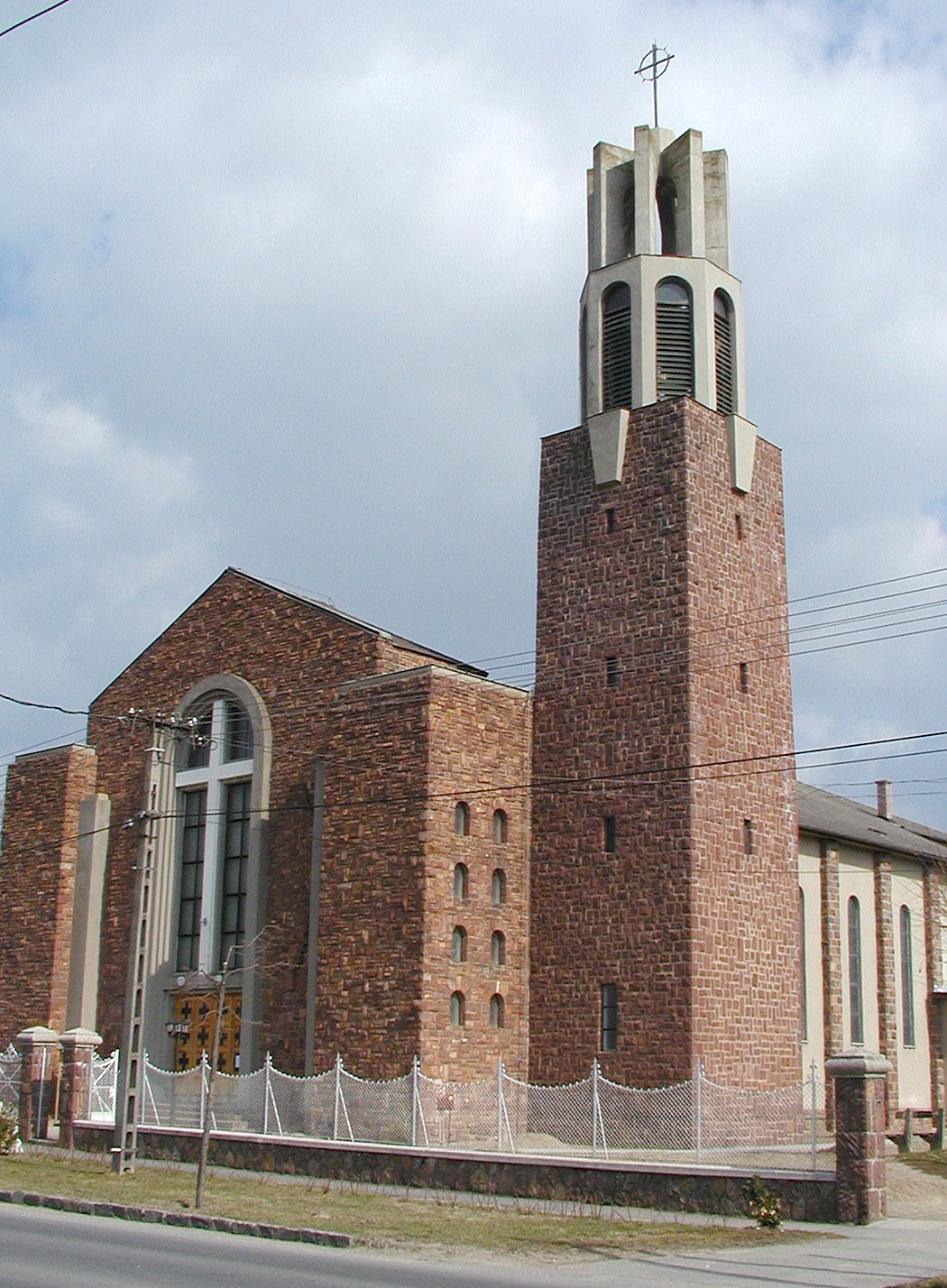
Roman Catholic Parish Church, Balatonlelle, 1943

Bertalan, son of architect Aladár Árkay, studied at Budapest Technical University until 1925 and subsequently worked under his father as well as in the Vienna offices of Peter Behrens. He and his father together designed the Roman Catholic memorial church at Mohács which was begun in 1926 and funded by donations. The stained-glass are the work of Árkay's first wife, Lili Sztehló. Árkay finished work on the Városmajori Roman Catholic Church in Budapest from 1932 to 1933, after his father's death. The building, with its concrete structure and separate belltower, was the city's first modern church. He worked on housing in the VIII district on the south side of Köztársaság tér (1933–34). In 1936, he designed the Hungarian pavilion for the Triennale in Milan and from 1945 worked on restoration of historic buildings – e.g., the Museum of Fine Arts (Budapest) and church buildings in Vác. From 1949 he worked on the development of the capital at the Department of public building and also designed a number of schools (e.g., Sátoraljaújhely, 1943) and apartment buildings. His plans are held in the Budapest History Museum.
