= St. Stephen's Mausoleum =

Memorial in Székesfehérvár, Hungary

Coordinates: 47°11′31″N 18°24′42″E

St. Stephen's Mausoleum is a memorial building to Stephen I of Hungary in Székesfehérvár, Hungary. It was built in the late 1930s behind the excavated ruins of the Basilica of the Assumption of the Blessed Virgin Mary where Stephen had been originally buried, and contains the 11th-century sarcophagus of the deceased king.

== Building and decoration ==
The mausoleum building was designed in 1936 by archaeologist Géza Lux in collaboration with his father Kálmán Lux, and completed in 1938. On the exterior are relief sculptures by Walter Madarassy.

The interior walls are decorated with frescoes by Vilmos Aba-Novák representing themes related to St. Stephen, interpreted in the Hungarian political context of 1938. The main scenes are the "Holy Dexter" or Stephen's right hand, a relic that is now kept in St. Stephen's Basilica in Budapest, on the northern wall; and the Holy Crown of Hungary (also known as the Crown of St. Stephen) on the southern wall, together with a procession of rulers of Hungary and dignitaries, all the way to Miklós Horthy and his former minister Bálint Hóman. Smaller scenes depict St. Gellért baptizing the Hungarians and the foundation of the church on the western (entrance) wall, and the legend of the dream of Sylvester II and St. Stephen's coronation on the Eastern side. The frescoes' religious and political themes led to their whitewashing in the Communist post-war era, which ironically contributed to their preservation. They were restored in 1996.

The large stained glass window of the eastern wall was created by Lili Árkayné Sztehló and depicted episodes of St. Stephen's life. It was destroyed during World War II and recreated in 1996-97 using the artist's original patterns.

== Sarcophagus ==
The sarcophagus of St. Stephen is a re-employed antique marble sarcophagus, which was recarved in the 11th century, most likely on the occasion of Stephen's canonization in 1083. It is decorated with cherubs, rosettes and flowers on the long sides, and with an angel on one of the short sides (the other is left uncarved).

The sarcophagus is now empty. It was found in 1814 and kept from then in the Hungarian National Museum, but was only identified as St. Stephen's in 1930. As a consequence, it was transferred to Székesfehérvár and placed in the newly built mausoleum in 1938.

== August 1938 celebrations ==
The mausoleum was a focal point of the 1938 celebration of the 900th anniversary of St. Stephen's death. A series of events that year culminated on August 18 with a special session of both houses of the Hungarian Parliament that made August 20, the day of the deceased king's canonization in 1083, into a national holiday (hu). The event was celebrated in 1941 by another fresco of Aba-Novák in Székesfehérvár City Hall, where the parliamentary session had taken place. The same day, Miklós Horthy and accompanying dignitaries visited the mausoleum, with the frescoes still a work in progress presented to them by Aba-Novák, and went on to inaugurate the statue of St. Stephen by Ferenc Sidló. The parliamentary session had originally been planned for August 21, but was brought forward because of an appointment of Horthy with Adolf Hitler that was scheduled that day.

== Gallery ==
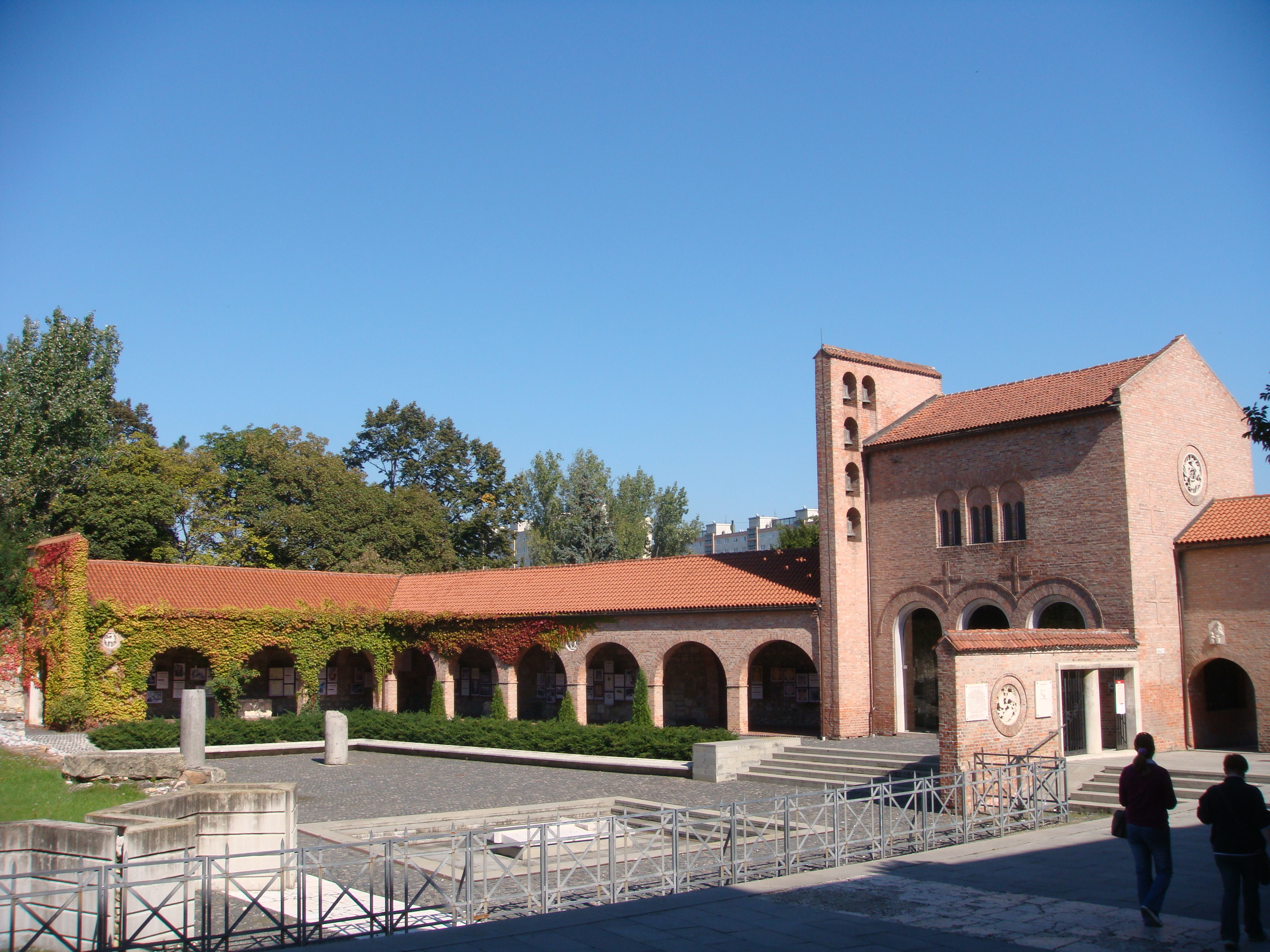
Exterior view of the mausoleum (right) and ossuary

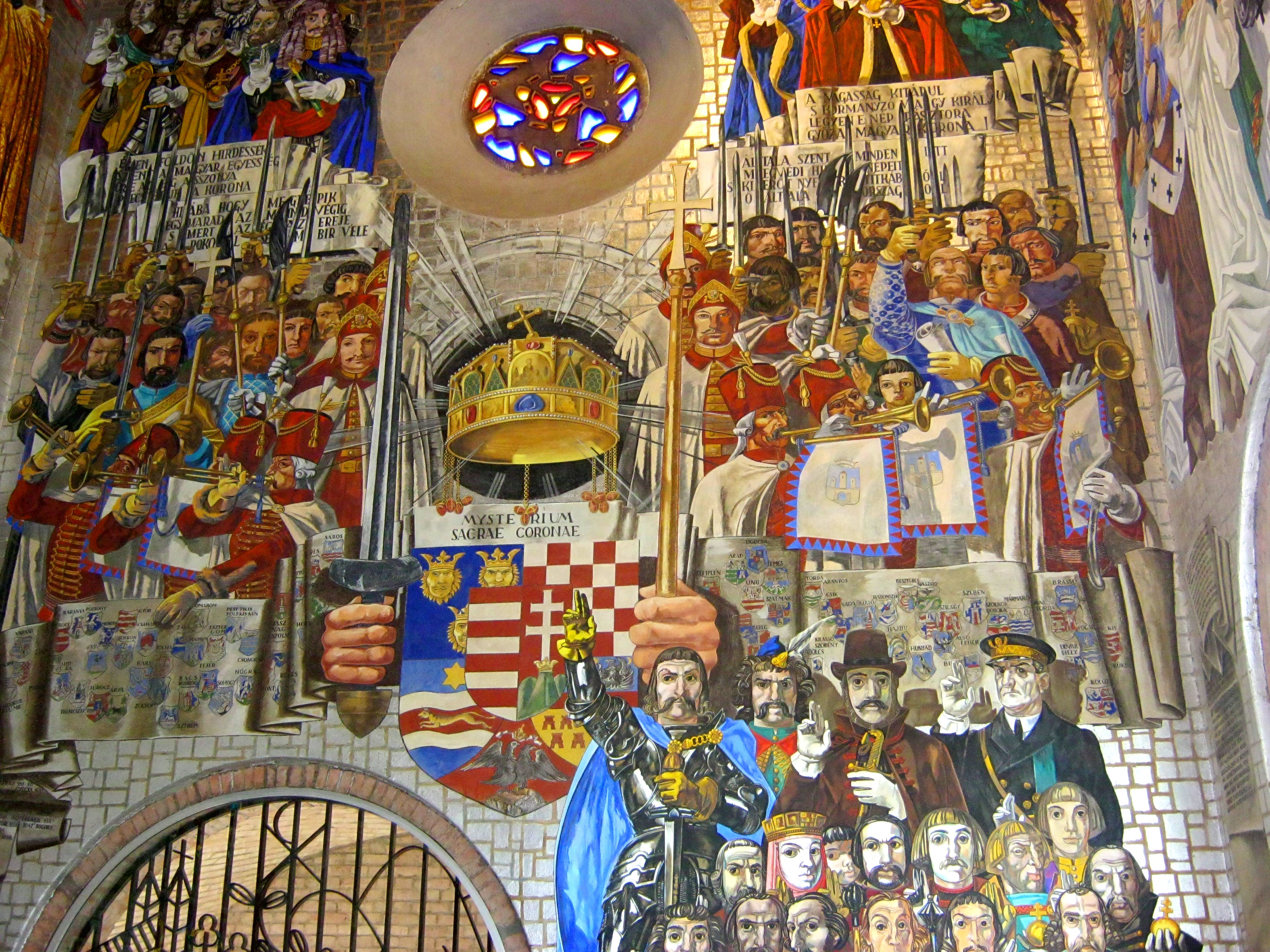
Fresco of the Holy Crown of Hungary, featuring Bálint Hóman and Admiral Horthy (lower right)

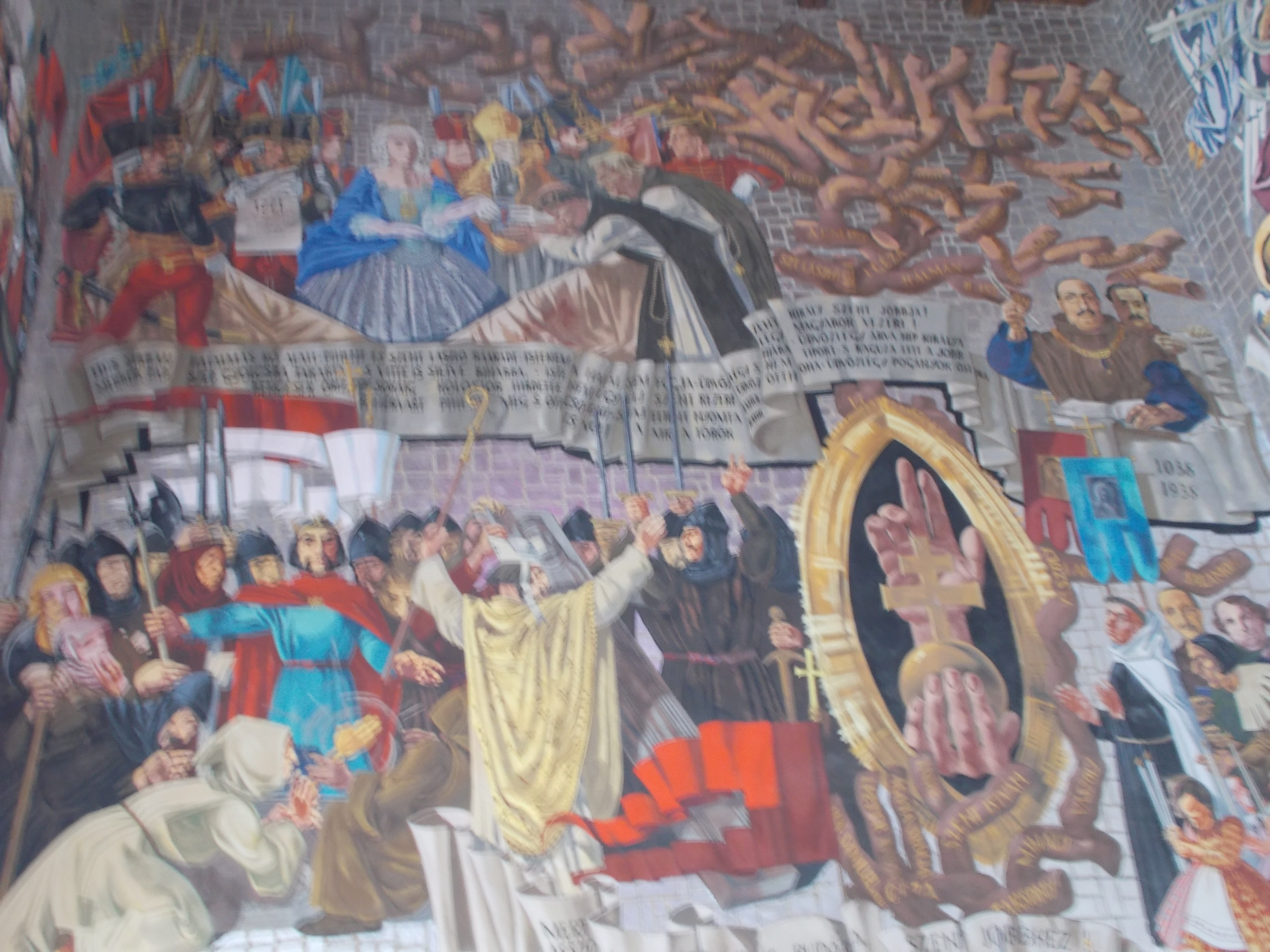
Fresco of the Holy Right Hand of St. Stephen

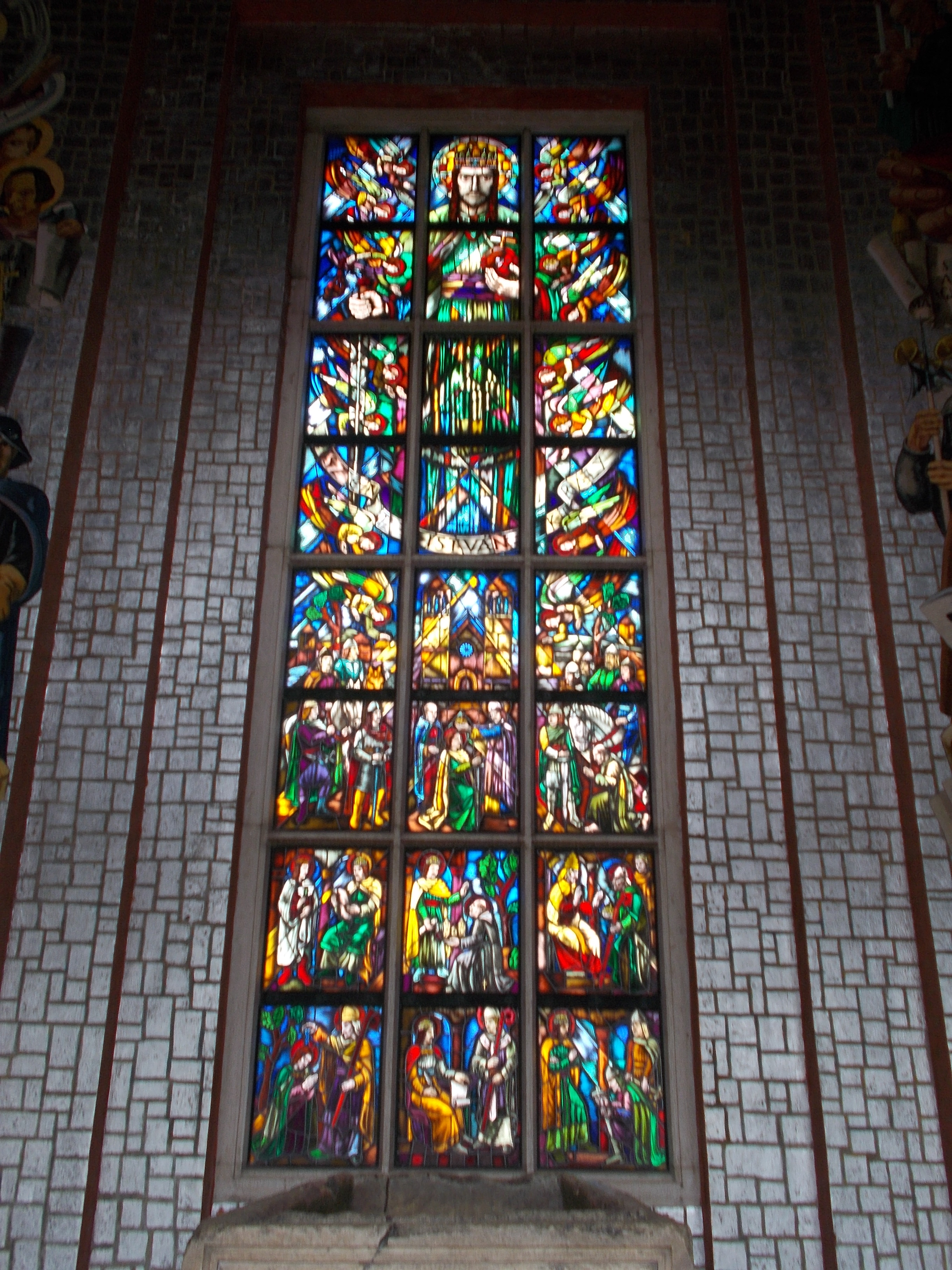
Stained glass window

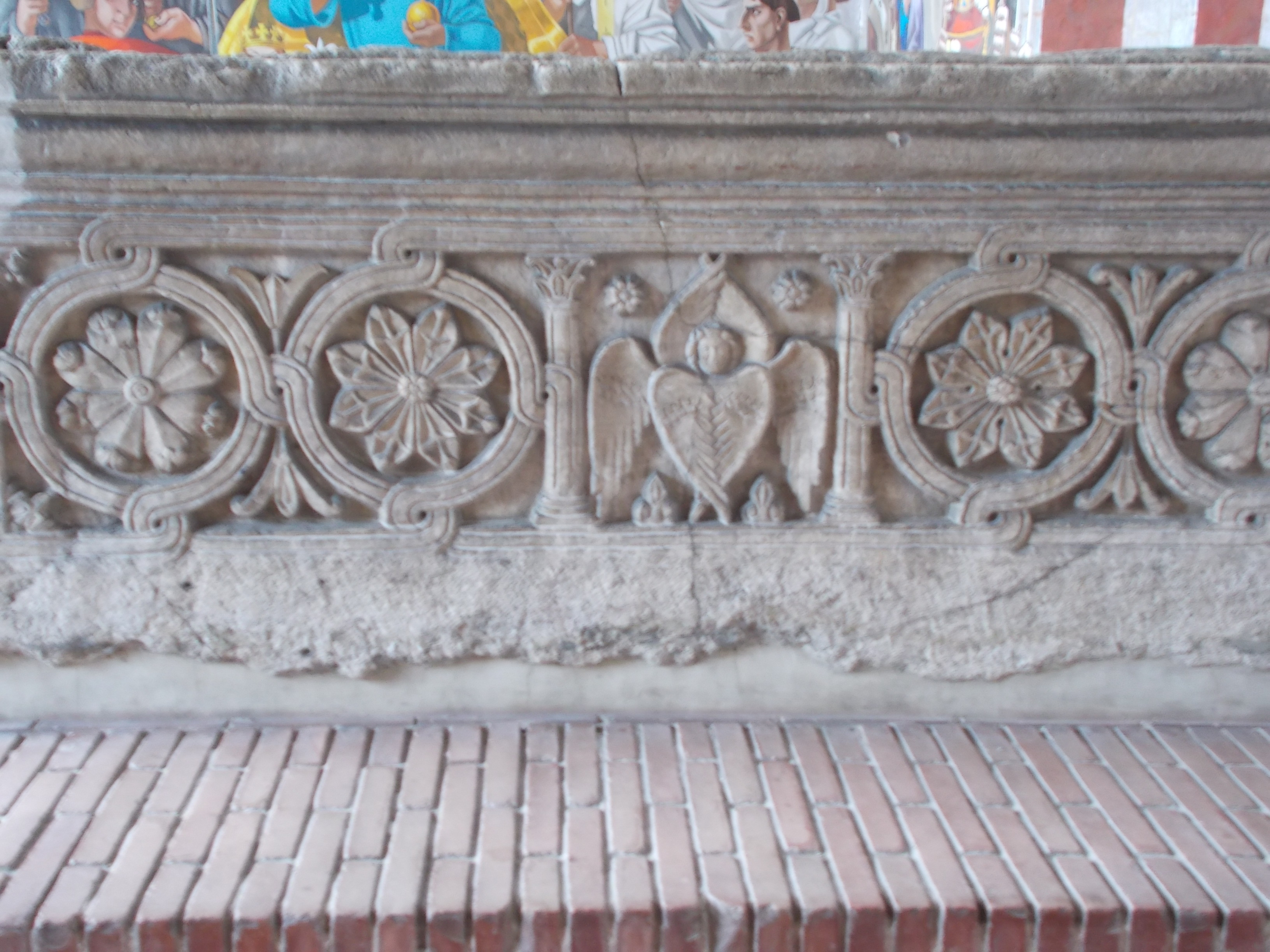
Sarcophagus of St. Stephen, side view

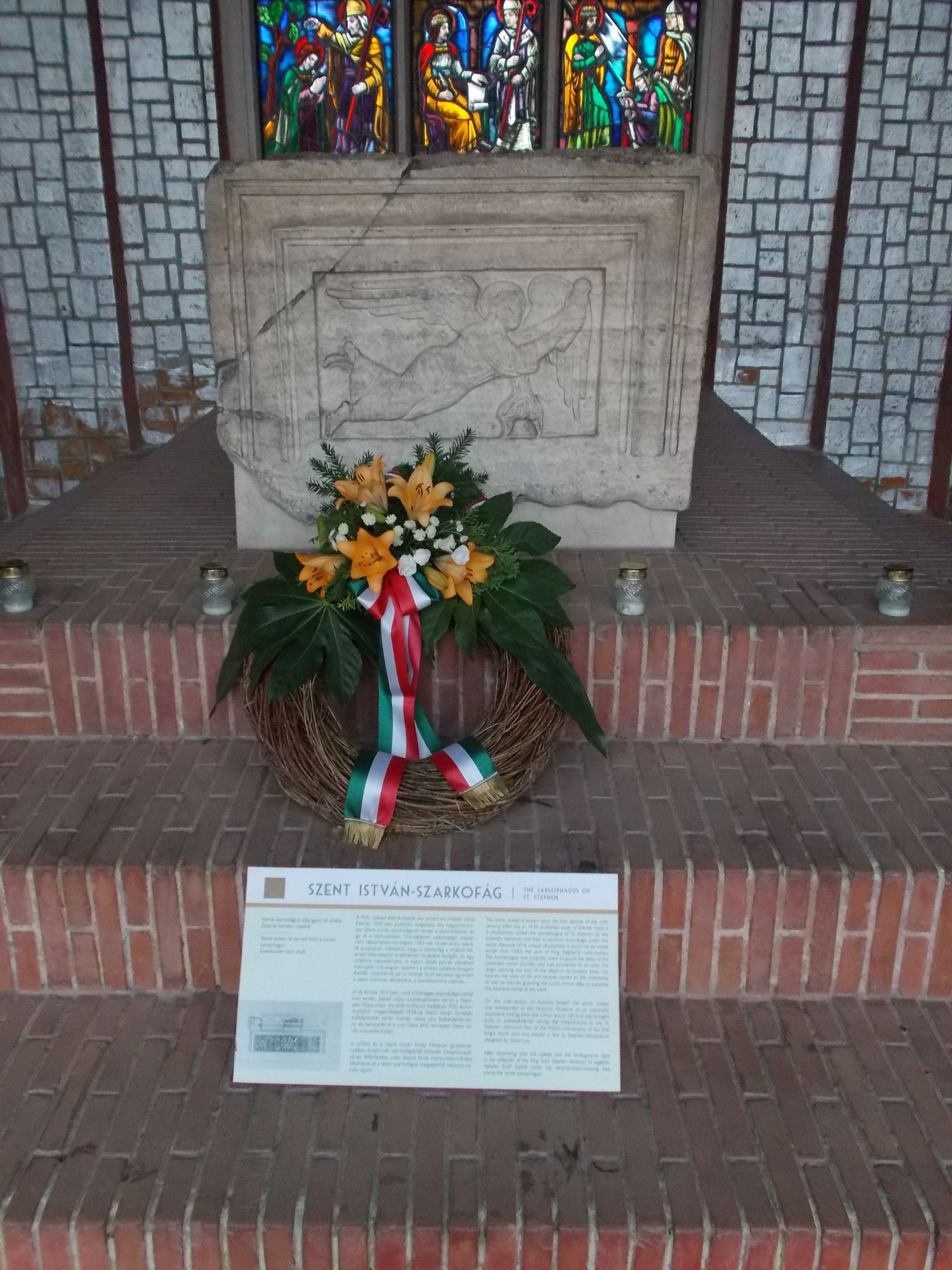
Sarcophagus of St. Stephen, front view

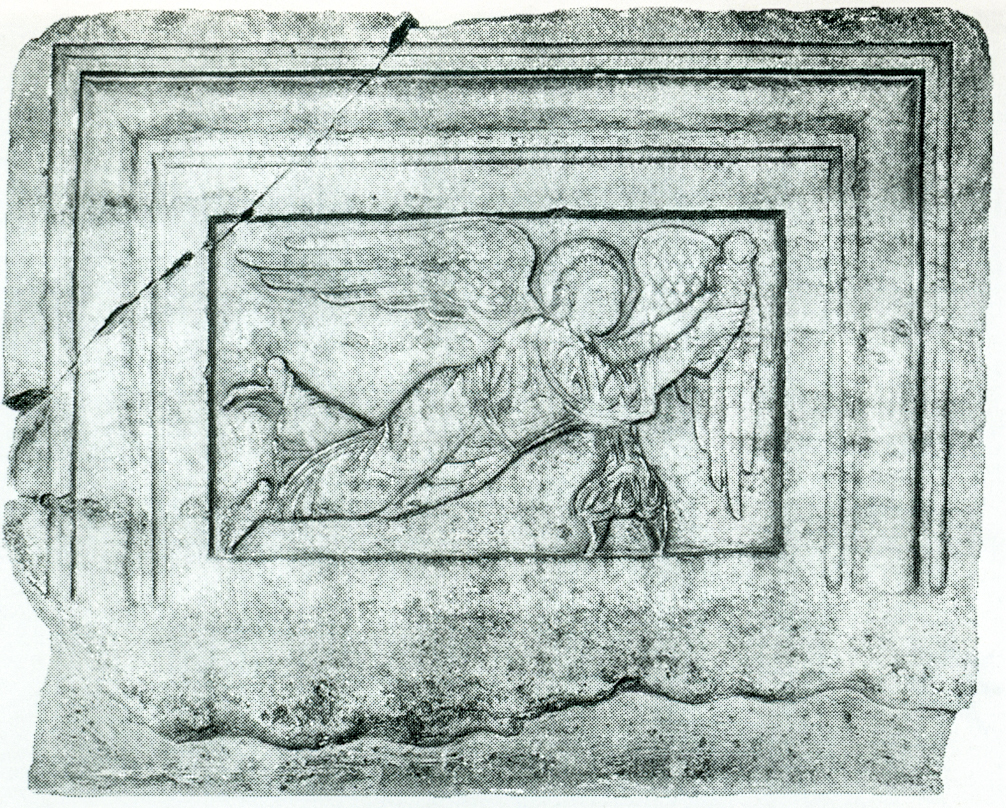
detail of the angel sculpture
