= Chminianska Nová Ves =

- Municipality
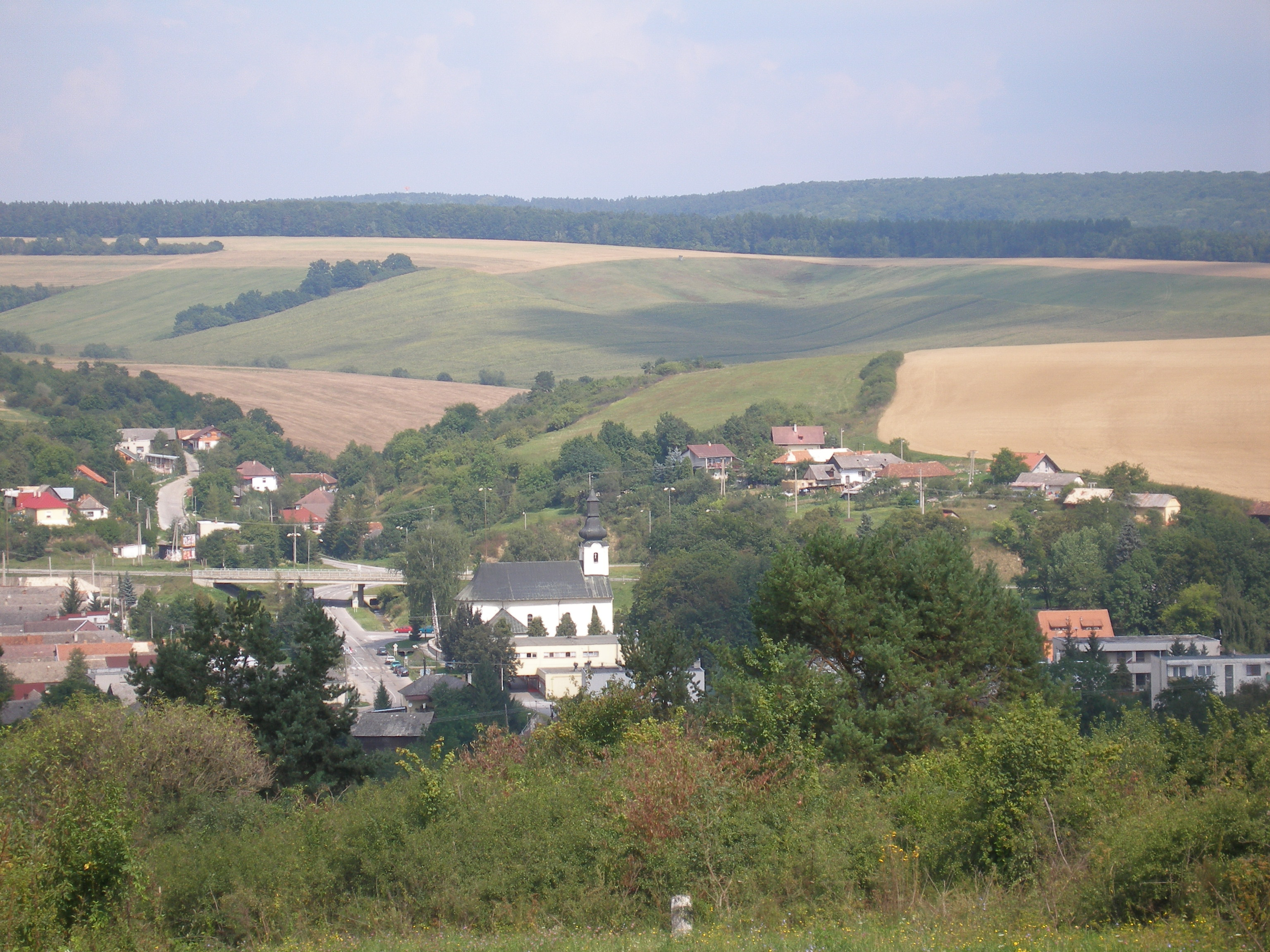

- Flag

- Location of Chminianska Nová Ves in the Prešov Region Location of Chminianska Nová Ves in Slovakia
- Coordinates: 49.00°N 21.08°E
- Country: Slovakia
- Region: Prešov Region
- District: Prešov District
- First mentioned: 1248

Area
  - Total: 10.57 km^{2} (4.08 sq mi)
- Elevation: 423 m (1,388 ft)

Population (2025)
  - Total: 1,283
- Time zone: UTC+1 (CET)
  - Summer (DST): UTC+2 (CEST)
- Postal code: 823 3
- Area code: +421 51
- Vehicle registration plate (until 2022): PO
- Website: www.chminianska.sk

Chminianska Nová Ves (Rusyn: Хімняньска Нова Вес, Hungarian: Szinyeújfalu) is a village and municipality in Prešov District in the Prešov Region of eastern Slovakia.

== History ==
In historical records the village was first mentioned in 1248.

== Geography ==
The municipality lies at an altitude of 423 metres (1,388 ft) and covers an area of 10.57 km^{2} (4.08 sq mi) (2025).

== Notable people ==
- Pál Szinyei Merse (1845–1920), Hungarian painter and art educator

== Population ==
Population statistic (10 years)
Year	1995	2005	2015	2025
Count	1076	1241	1304	1283
Difference		+15.33%	+5.07%	−1.61%

Population statistic
Year	2024	2025
Count	1291	1283
Difference		−0.61%

It has a population of 1283 people (31 December 2025).

=== Ethnicity ===
Census 2021 (1+ %)
Ethnicity	Number	Fraction
Slovak	1203	95.55%
Not found out	60	4.76%
Total	1259	

In year 2021 was 1259 people by ethnicity 1203 as Slovak, 60 as Not found out, 12 as Rusyn, 5 as Czech, 4 as Moravian, 4 as Other, 1 as Ukrainian, 1 as Romanian and 1 as Bulgarian.

Note on population: The difference values of population numbers in the table "Population statistic" and in the sections "Ethnicity" & "Religion" is caused by the use of various statistical methods.

=== Religion ===
Census 2021 (1+ %)
Religion	Number	Fraction
Roman Catholic Church	1055	83.8%
None	59	4.69%
Evangelical Church	53	4.21%
Not found out	52	4.13%
Greek Catholic Church	26	2.07%
Total	1259	

In year 2021 was 1259 people by religion 1055 from Roman Catholic Church, 59 from None, 53 from Evangelical Church, 52 from Not found out, 26 from Greek Catholic Church, 8 from Ad hoc movements, 3 from Eastern Orthodox Church, 2 from Apostolic Church and 1 from Other and not ascertained christian church.

== Genealogical resources ==
The records for genealogical research are available at the state archive "Statny Archiv in Presov, Slovakia"

- Roman Catholic church records (births/marriages/deaths): 1814–1895 (parish B)
- Greek Catholic church records (births/marriages/deaths): 1825–1898 (parish B)
- Lutheran church records (births/marriages/deaths): 1753–1895 (parish B)

== See also ==
- List of municipalities and towns in Slovakia
