= Viktor Olgyai =

Hungarian artist (1870–1929)

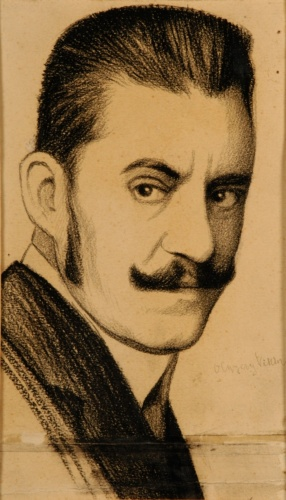
Self-portrait (date unknown)

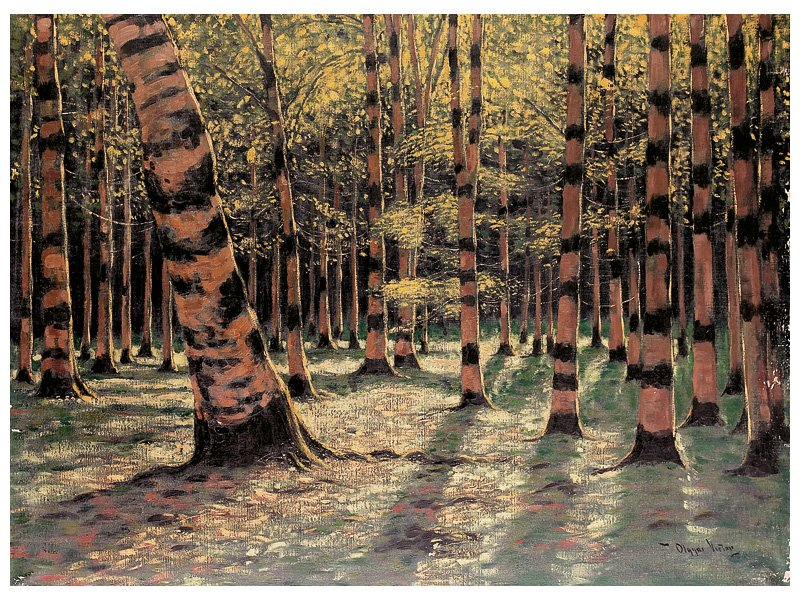
Closeup of the Forest (1910)

Viktor Olgyai, originally Viktor Matirko (1 November 1870, Spišská Nová Ves - 20 June 1929, Salzburg) was a Hungarian painter and graphic artist. His family's name was changed in 1892.

== Biography ==
His father was a retired district judge. When he was still a child, his family moved to Levoča where he attended the public schools and began preparing for a career in the priesthood. He was then admitted to the seminary in Košice and, as one of the best students there, was sent to study at the Pázmáneum in Vienna.

He returned to Lőcsé in 1890 and experienced a sort of epiphany while spending time in the nearby pine forests. He decided to take up drawing but, unable to achieve the desired effects with a pencil, turned to using a pen instead.

In 1891, he enrolled at the University of Budapest where he continued his linguistic and literary studies, but persevered with his drawing and sent one of sketch books to Artúr Tölgyessy, who encouraged him to pursue his interest in art. After a visit to Tölgyessy's studio in Margitta, and with the support of his brother Bertalan, he enrolled at the Academy of Fine Arts, Vienna and studied landscape painting with Eduard Peithner von Lichtenfels. He also took classes in etching from William Unger, which had a decisive influence on his work. He left the Academy in 1893 and began spending the winters with his family in Bacskó.

He became a lithographer and went to Banská Bystrica in 1902, where he helped to create a literary and art magazine called "Havi Szemle" (Monthly Review), which he edited. His brother was a major contributor. It was published for only three years. In 1906, he was invited to become head of the graphics department at the Hungarian University of Fine Arts. He remained in that position until his death and was active in the organization and administration of several professional art societies.

He committed suicide while vacationing in Austria. Shortly after, a major retrospective of his work was held at the Hall of Art.
