= Kalman Maklary Fine Arts =

Art gallery in Falk Miksa Street, Hungary

Kálmán Makláry Fine Arts
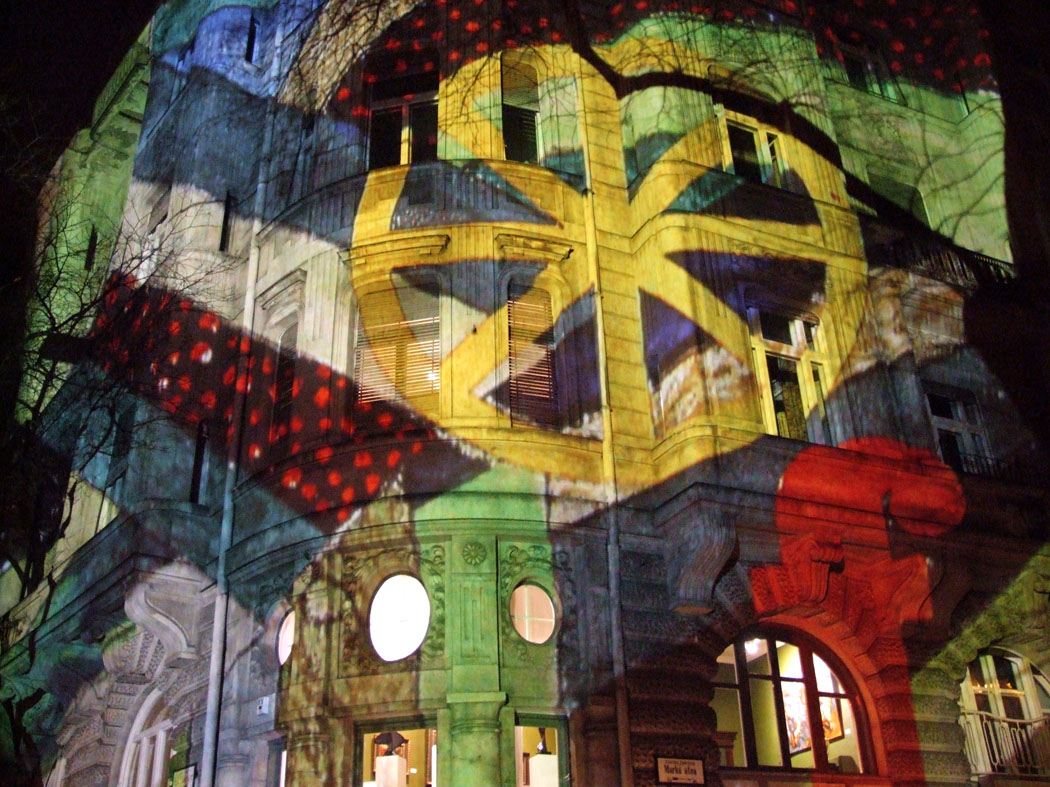
- Kálmán Makláry Fine Arts with light paintings on its wall

- Location within Budapest
- Established: 2005
- Location: 1055 Budapest, Falk Miksa Street 10, Hungary
- Coordinates: 47.50965°N 19.047994°E
- Type: Art gallery, modern and contemporary fine arts
- Director: Kálmán Makláry
- Curator: ?
- Public transit access: BKV, tram 4, tram 6
- Website: http://www.kalmanmaklary.com

The Kálmán Makláry Fine Arts gallery is a showcase for artists of the Post-War School of Paris. The gallery is a member of Syndicat National des Antiquaires Négociants en objets d'Art Tableaux anciens et modernes de France.

== Exhibitions ==
=== 2013 ===
- Hur Kyung-Ae – recent works – one-man show
- Judit Reigl – Abstract Expressionism – exhibition from the Outburst series, 1955–1957
- Kamill Major – recent works – one-man show
- Francois Fiedler – works from 1945 to 1965 – one-man show

=== 2012 ===
- Hur Kyung-Ae – recent paintings – one-man show
- Fiedler & Hargittai
- Géza Szóbel – one-man show
- Hantai-Reigl-Fiedler – Gestural paintings from the 50-60's
- Antal Bíró – one-man show – works from 1955 to 1965

=== 2011 ===
- Hur Kyung-Ae – one-man show
- Kamill Major – one-man show
- Judit Reigl – works on paper
- Simon Hantai – one-man show
- Tibor Csernus – one-man show
- Étienne Sándorfi – one-man show

=== 2010 ===
- Kamill Major – one-man show
- Gustave Miklós – Joseph Csaky – sculptures (with catalog)
- Paul Kallos – one-man show
- Étienne Sándorfi – one-man show

=== 2009 ===
- Kamill Major – one-man show (with catalog)
- Judit Reigl – series progress – works from 1974 to 1988 (with catalog)
- Sam Havadtoy – one-man show (with catalog)
- Gabor Mezey – one-man show

=== 2008 ===
- Simon Hantai – homage exhibition
- Endre Balint – one-man show
- Etienne Beöthy – sculptures
- Judit Reigl – series Man – works from 1961 to 1973 (with catalog)

=== 2007 ===
- Robert Marcel – recent photographs – one-man show (with catalog)
- Lucien & Rodolf Hervé – Hommage exhibition (with catalog)
- Judit Reigl – Simon Hantai – works from the 50–60s
- Tibor Csernus – one-man show (with catalog)
- Béla Czóbel – one-man show (with catalog)
- Modernism II – Moholy-Nagy & André Kertész (with catalog)

=== 2006 ===
- Étienne Sándorfi – one-man show (with catalog)
- Modernism – collection from Masters of the Hungarian Avant Garde and Modernism (with catalog)
- Master Drawings – collection from Masters of the Hungarian Avant Garde and Modernism

=== 2005 ===
- Opening exhibition – Huns in Paris
- Judit Reigl – early works, paintings from 1950 to 1960
- Alfred Reth – one-man show

=== Exhibitions with other institutions ===
==== 2010 ====
- Judit Reigl – retrospective exhibition in Modem

==== 2007 ====
- Étienne Sándorfi – retrospective exhibition in Modem

==== 2005 ====
- Judit Reigl – retrospective exhibition in Műcsarnok

==== 2003 ====
- Alfred Reth – Budapest Gallery, Alfred Reth – Institut Hongrois

== Art Fairs ==
The gallery is regularly present at the European art fairs, taking part at Art Cologne in Köln, at Salon Du Collectionneur in Paris, at Art13 London and is a returning exhibitor at Brafa in Brussels, and at Art Paris. In 2010, the Biennale Des Antiquaires in Paris invited them to the Tremplin (Springboard) section, introducing the best new galleries. In spring of 2012, the European Fine Art Foundation (TEFAF), celebrating a 25th anniversary of its Maastricht far, selected the gallery among the world's six most promising young art dealers, to introduce themselves within the Showcase framework at TEFAF. In autumn of 2012, the gallery represented its artists with an independent stand at the Paris Biennale.

=== 2013 ===
- Brafa – 58th Brussels Antiques and Fine Art Fair
- Art13 London – 1st Modern and Contemporary Art Fair
- Art Paris – Modern and Contemporary Art Fair
- Art Show – Busan
- KIAF – Korean International Art Fair

=== 2012 ===
- Brafa – 57th Brussels Antiques and Fine Art Fair
- TEFAF – Showcase
- Art Paris – Modern and Contemporary Art Fair
- Biennale des Antiquaries

=== 2011 ===
- Brafa – 56th Brussels Antiques and Fine Art Fair

=== 2010 ===
- Brafa – 55th Brussels Antiques and Fine Art Fair
- Art Paris – Modern and Contemporary Art Fair
- Biennale des Antiquaries – Tremplin pour la Biennale
- Budapest Art Fair

=== 2009 ===
- Brafa – 54th Brussels Antiques and Fine Art Fair
- Budapest Art Fair
- Art Paris – Modern and Contemporary Art Fair

=== 2008 ===
- Art Cologne
- Art Paris – Modern and Contemporary Art Fair
- The Moscow World Fine Art Fair
- Budapest Art Fair
- PLUG Contemporary – Etienne Sandorfi – one–man show

=== 2007 ===
- Le Salon Du Collectionneurs
- Budapest Art Fair
- PLUG Contemporary – Judit Reigl – one-man show

=== 2006 ===
- Budapest Art Fair
- PLUG Contemporary – Judit Reigl – one-man show

=== 2005 ===
- Antik Enterior

== Books and catalogs ==
1. Simon Hantai Vol. I-II. Text by Agnes Berecz (IN GIFT BOX). Hardcover-spiral: 680 pages. Vol. I. Publisher: Kalman Maklary Fine Arts Ltd.; 1st ed. (2012). ISBN 9638944110. ISBN 978-9638944115 Vol. II. Publisher: Kalman Maklary Fine Arts Ltd.; 1st ed. (2013). ISBN 978-9638944139
2. Reigl Hantai Fiedler. Paperback: 36 pages. Publisher: Kalman Maklary Fine Arts Ltd. (2012).
3. Major Kamill. Text by Geza Perneczky. Hardcover: 100 pages. Publisher: Maklary Artworks Ltd.; 1st ed. (2011). Language: English, French, Hungarian. ISBN 978-963-89441-0-8
4. Judit Regil. Text by Agnes Berecz. Hardcover: 300 pages. Publisher: Kalman Maklary Fine Arts Ltd. (2010). Language: English, French, Hungarian. ISBN 9638735090, ISBN 978-9638735096
5. Joseph Csáky, Gustave Miklós. Hardcover: 116 pages. Publisher: Makláry Artworks Ltd.; 1st ed. (2010). ISBN 9638735082, ISBN 978-9638735089
6. Judit Reigl 1974–1988. Text by Marcelin Pleynet. Hardcover: 130 pages. Publisher: Maklary Artworks Ltd., Erdész & Makláry Fine Arts; 1st ed. (2009). ISBN 9638824719, ISBN 978-9638824714
7. Judit Reigl 1961–1973. Text by Agnes Berecz. Paperback: 90 pages. Publisher: Maklary Artworks Ltd., Erdész & Makláry Fine Arts; 1st ed. (2008). Language: English, French, Hungarian. ISBN 9638735074, ISBN 978-9638735072
8. Endre Bálint. Paperback: 88 pages. Publisher: Maklary Artworks Ltd., Erdész & Makláry Fine Arts; 1st ed. (2008). Language: English. ISBN 9630655519, ISBN 978-9630655514
9. Válogatás 2007–2008. Hardcover: 104 pages. Publisher: Maklary Artworks Ltd.; 1st ed. (2007). Language: Hungarian. ISBN 978-963-87350-6-5
10. Sándorfi. Hardcover: 352 pages. Publisher: Maklary Artworks Ltd.; 1st ed. (2007). Language: English, French, Hungarian. ISBN 9638735031, ISBN 978-9638735034
11. Robert Marcel. Paperback: 52 pages. Publisher: Maklary Artworks Ltd., Erdész & Makláry Fine Arts; 1st Ed. (2007). Language: English, French, Hungarian. ISBN 978-963-06-3492-2
12. Lucien Hervé, Rudolf Hervé. Paperback: 56 pages. Publisher: Maklary Artworks Ltd., Erdész & Makláry Fine Arts; 1st Ed. Edition (2007). Language: English, French, Hungarian. ISBN 978-963-06-2864-8
13. Tibor Csernus. Text By Gabor Lajta. Paperback: 72 pages. Publisher: Maklary Artworks Ltd. 1st Ed. Edition (2007). Language: English, French, Hungarian. ISBN 978-963-87350-5-8
14. László Moholy-Nagy and André Kertész. Paperback: 44 pages. Publisher: Erdész & Makláry Fine Arts; 1st Ed. Edition (2007). Language: Hungarian. ISBN 978-963-06-1919-6
15. Bela Czobel. Text by Gergely Barki. Paperback: 52 pages. Publisher: Erdész & Makláry Fine Arts; 1st Ed. Edition (2007). Language: English, French, Hungarian. ISBN 978-963-87350-4-1
16. Judit Reigl (1950s). Text by Agnes Berecz. Paperback: 68 pages. Publisher: Maklary Artworks Ltd., Erdész & Makláry Fine Arts; 1st ed. (2006). Language: English, French, Hungarian. ISBN 963-87350-0-7, ISBN 978-963-87350-0-3.
17. Sándorfi. Hardcover: 52 pages. Publisher: Maklary Artworks Ltd.; 1st ed. (2006). Language: Hungarian. ISBN 963-87350-1-5
18. Modernizmus. Paperback: 40 pages. Publisher: Erdész & Makláry Fine Arts; 1st Ed. Edition (2006). Language: Hungarian. ISBN 963-87350-2-3
19. Odon Marffy. Text by Zoltan Rockenbauer. Hardcover: 476 pages. Publisher: Maklary Artworks Ltd.; 1st ed. (2006). Language: English, French, Hungarian. ISBN 9632299671
20. Alfréd Réth. Hardcover: 344 pages. Publisher: Maklary Artworks Ltd.; 1st ed. (2003). Language: English, French, Hungarian. ISBN 9632122445, ISBN 978-9632122441

== Videos ==
=== Videos about artists ===
- Judit Reigl
- Etienne Sándorfi
- Francois Fiedler
- Simon Hantai
- Kamill Major
- Geza Szobel
- László Moholy-Nagy
- Tibor Csernus
- Alfred Reth
- Bela Czobel

=== Videos about art fairs ===
- KIAF
- TEFAF
- Biennales des Antiquaires
- Art Paris
- Brafa
- Artshow Busan
- Art13 London
