= Hungarian University of Fine Arts =

Art school in Budapest, Hungary

Coordinates: 47°30′26″N 19°04′01″E

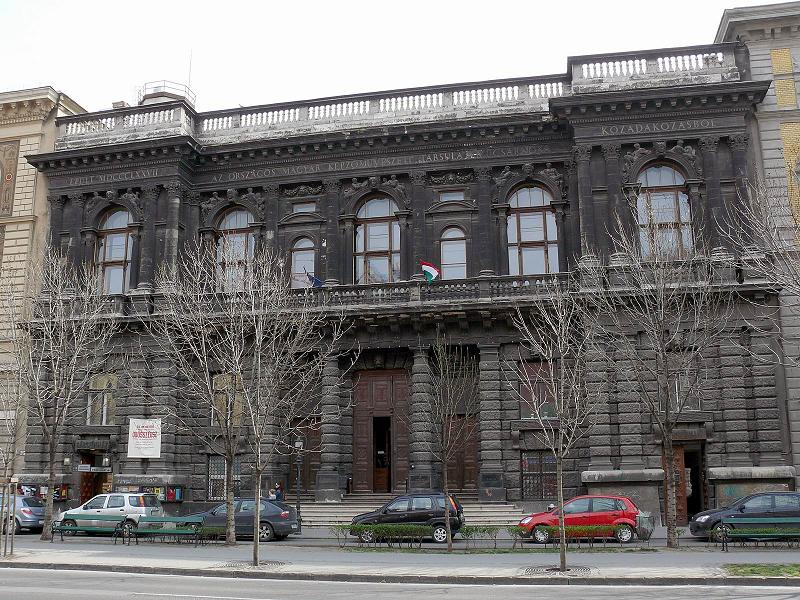
The central building of the university

The Hungarian University of Fine Arts (Hungarian: Magyar Képzőművészeti Egyetem, MKE) is the central Hungarian art school in Budapest, Andrássy Avenue. It was founded in 1871 as the Hungarian Royal Drawing School (Magyar Királyi Mintarajztanoda) and has been called University of Fine Arts since 2001.

== History ==
Until the mid-19th century, Hungarian artists were learning fine arts in Western European academies. The National Society of Hungarian Fine Arts (Országos Magyar Képzőművészeti Társulat) founded in 1861 was initiating the establishment of a Hungarian school of fine arts. Owing to this movement the Hungarian Royal Drawing School and Art Teachers' College (Magyar Királyi Mintarajztanoda és Rajztanárképezde) was opened in 1871. The present-day building of the university was built in 1877, designed by Alajos Rauscher and Adolf Láng.

In later decades, the school developed programs for training not only painters and sculptors, but artist-craftsmen, mosaic- and gobelin-makers, stage designers, costumers, and restorers. Numerous prominent Hungarian artists taught there, including the painters Károly Ferenczy, János Vaszary, Viktor Olgyai, Róbert Berény, Aurél Bernáth, Jenő Barcsay, and Márta Lacza; sculptor Béni Ferenczy and other notable artists.

=== Presidents from 1871 ===
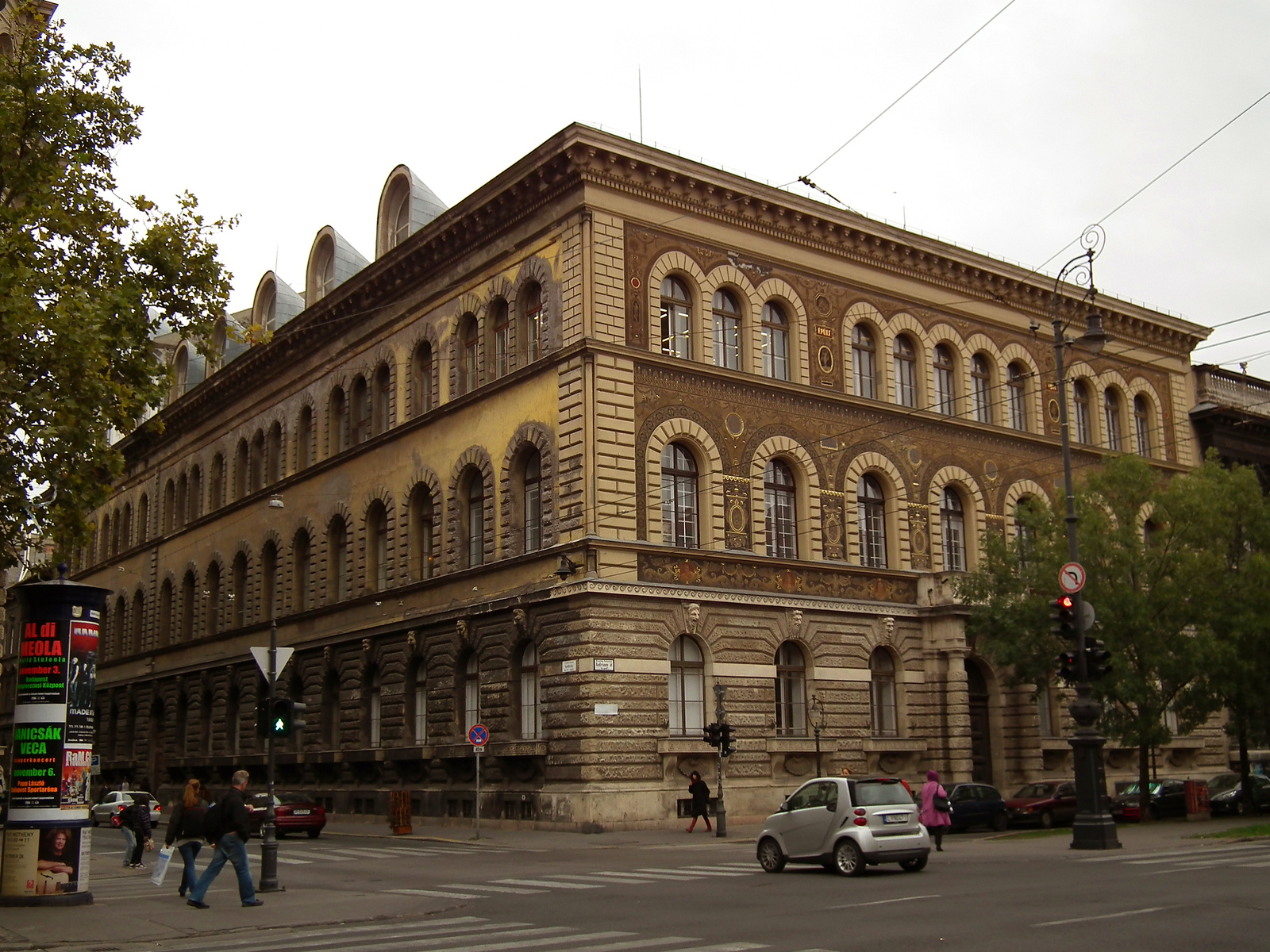
View of the University Building in 2011

- 1871–1902: Gusztáv Kelety, painter
- 1902–1905: Bertalan Székely, painter
- 1905–1920: Pál Szinyei Merse, painter
- 1921–1923: Károly Lyka, art historian
- 1923–1925: István Csók, painter
- 1925–1927: Oszkár Glatz, painter
- 1927–1931: István Réti, painter
- 1931–1932: Károly Andreetti, architect
- 1932–1935: István Réti, painter
- 1935–1937: Ágost Benkhard, painter
- 1937–1939: Antal Meyer, artist-craftsman
- 1939–1940: Gyula Rudnay, painter
- 1940: Dezső Pilch, painter
- 1940–1941: Ferenc Sidló, sculptor
- 1941–1943: Dezső Pilch, painter
- 1943: László Kandó, painter
- 1943–1945: Jenő Bory, architect, sculptor
- 1945: Lajos Varga-Nándor, draughtsman, painter
- 1945–1947: László Kandó, painter
- 1947–1949: Pál Pátzay, sculptor
- 1949–1956: Sándor Bortnyik, painter, draughtsman
- 1956–1973: Endre Domanovszky, painter
- 1973–1985: József Somogyi, sculptor
- 1985–1989: István Kiss, sculptor
- 1990–1995: Lajos Sváby, painter
- 1995–2002: Árpád Szabados, painter
- 2002–2005: Ádám Farkas, sculptor
- 2005–2013: Frigyes Kőnig, painter
- 2013–2016: Tibor Somorjai-Kiss, graphic artist
- 2016-2021: Judit Csanádi, stage designer

- 2021-present: István Erőss, graphic artist

== Buildings ==
- Hungarian University of Fine Arts (Hungary, Budapest, 1062 Andrássy út 69–71.) with the Barcsay-hall.
- Strawberry's Garden (Budapest, 1063 Kmety Gy u. 26–28. )
- Feszty House (Budapest, 1063, Bajza u. 39)
- Somogyi József Artists' Colony (Tihany, 8237 Major u. 63.)

== Departments ==
- Program in Fine Art Theory
- Visual Education Program
- Scenography Program
- Intermedia Program
- Conservation Program
- Graphic Design Program
- Printmaking Program
- Sculpture Program
- Painting Program
- Doctoral Programme
- Visual Art program

== Notable people ==
- 1879–1959 Jenő Bory
- 1934–2008: János Major, graphic artist
- 1946: Orshi Drozdik, Feminist artist
- 2002: Márta Kucsora, contemporary artist

== Exhibitions ==
Barcsay-hall (Barcsay-terem) is the biggest gallery to exhibit the student's and foreign's artworks. But you will find four other smaller places to show the artworks.
