= Pál Szinyei Merse =

Hungarian painter (1845–1920)

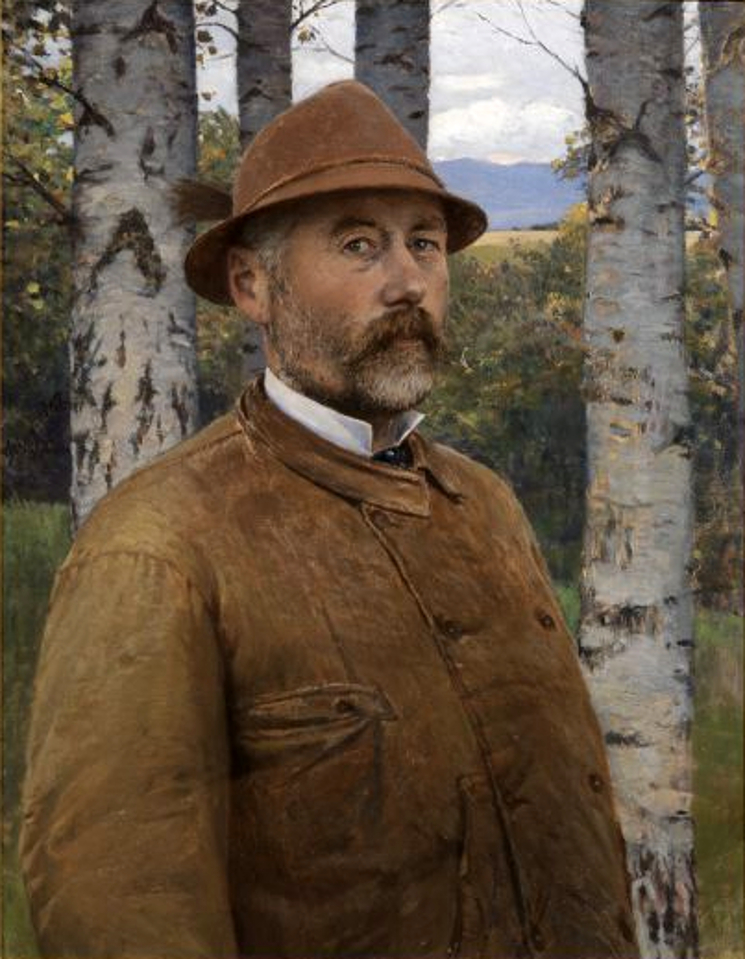
Self-portrait (1897)

Pál Szinyei Merse (4 July 1845, Szinyeújfalu – 2 February 1920, Jernye) was a Hungarian painter and art educator.

== Biography ==
He was born into a family of the old nobility who supported the Hungarian Revolution. Because of the political unrest, he attended private schools. In 1864, with the support of his parents, he enrolled at the Academy of Fine Arts, Munich, where he studied under Alexander von Wagner. Later, from 1867 to 1869, his teacher was Karl von Piloty. While there, he met Wilhelm Leibl, who introduced him to plein-air painting. After seeing a major art exhibition in 1869, he was anxious to get to work and left the Academy.

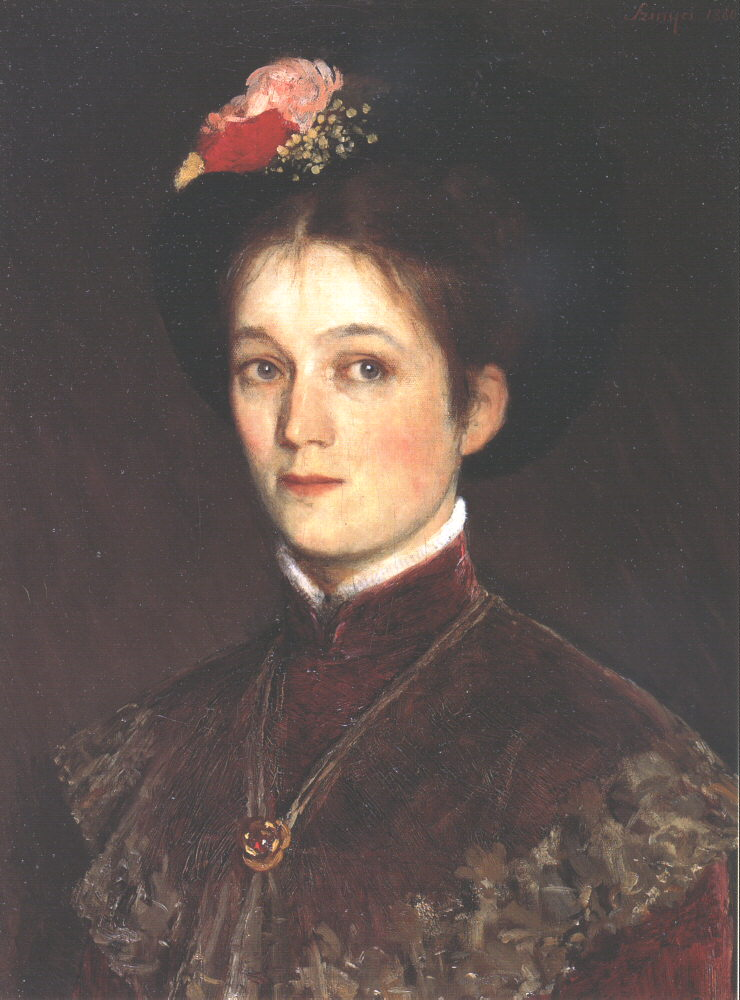
Portrait of the Artist's Wife, Zsófia (1880)

In 1870, at the outbreak of the Franco-Prussian War he moved to Genoa and was inclined to stay there, but returned in 1872 at the urging of his father. Once there, he set up a studio near one operated by his friend, Arnold Böcklin. The following year, he got married. Soon, he was largely occupied with financial matters and his painting suffered. After years of critical abuse and increasing family problems, he gave up painting for over a decade, beginning in 1882.

In 1887, his problems culminated in a divorce. For the next few years, he concentrated on raising his son Félix, who had remained with him. When Félix left home, his friends began a campaign to convince him that he should start painting again. In 1894, they organized a retrospective exhibition where one of his works was purchased by the Emperor Franz Joseph. For the rest of his life, he painted incessantly, although he was still very critical of himself and produced fewer paintings per year than before.

In 1896, he was elected to the Diet of Hungary, where he advocated for major reforms in art education. He then began to exhibit widely, in Paris, St.Louis, Berlin and Rome, among other places. In 1902, he went blind in one eye, but continued to work at the same pace. In 1905, he became President of the Hungarian University of Fine Arts. He held that office until his death, encouraging young artists and supporting the art colony in Nagybánya.

In 1912, the Ernst Museum organized the largest exhibition of his works up to that time and he was awarded the small cross of the Order of Saint Stephen of Hungary. Later, the Museum of Fine Arts set aside a room for his paintings. After his death, a group of his friends created the "Szinyei Merse Society" to continue his work of discovering and promoting new, young artists.

== Selected paintings ==
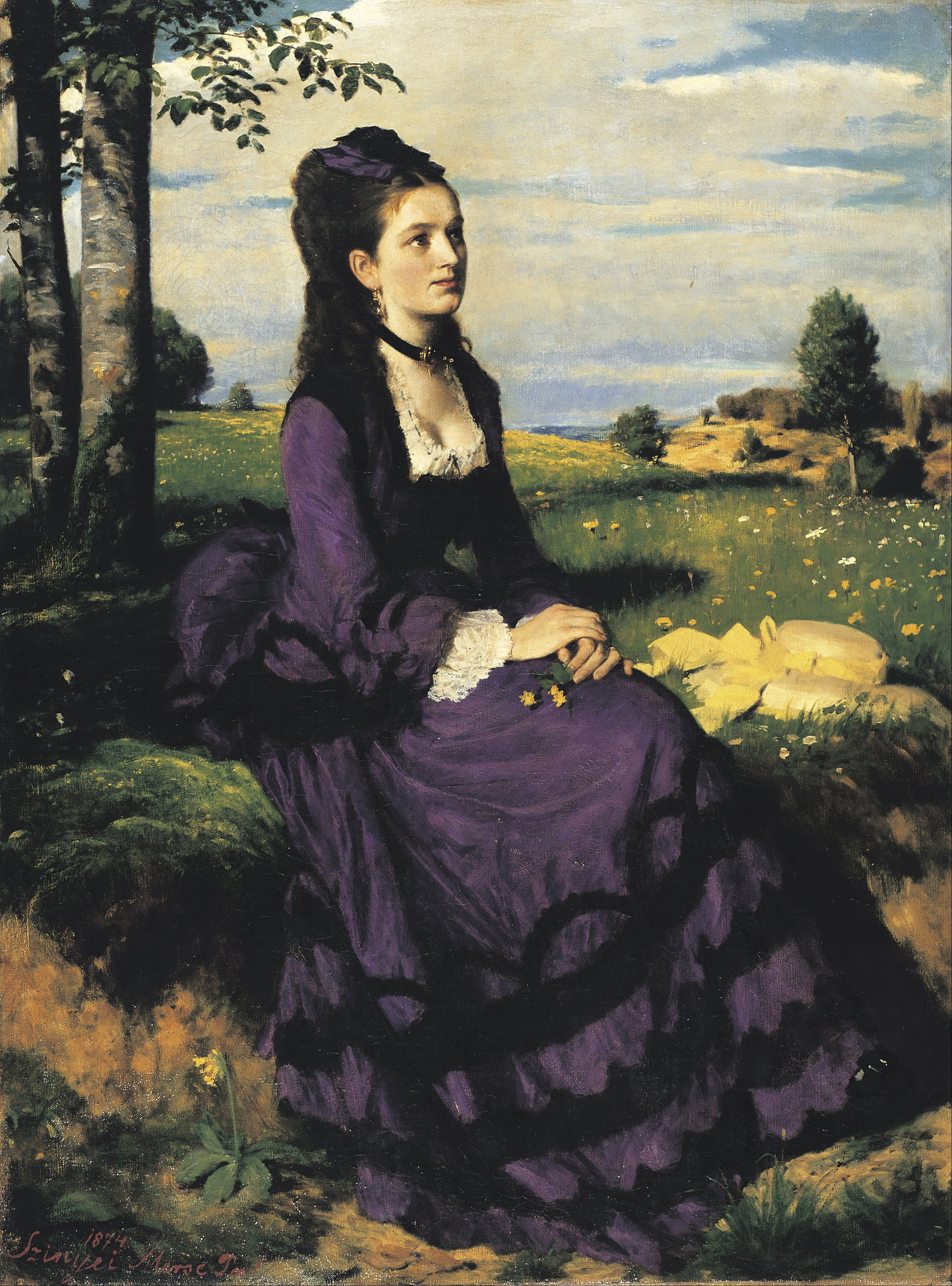
Lady in Violet (1874)

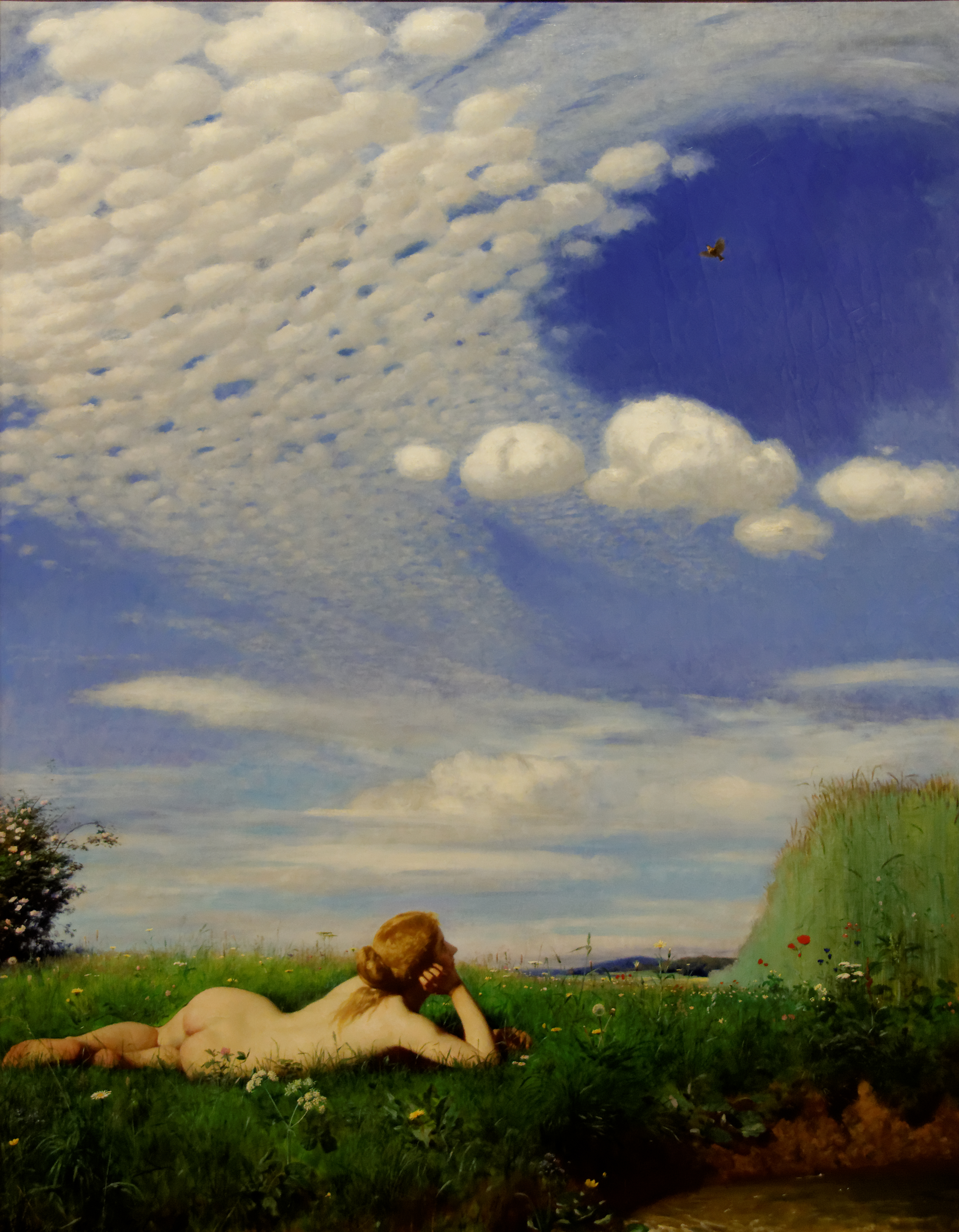
Skylark (1882)

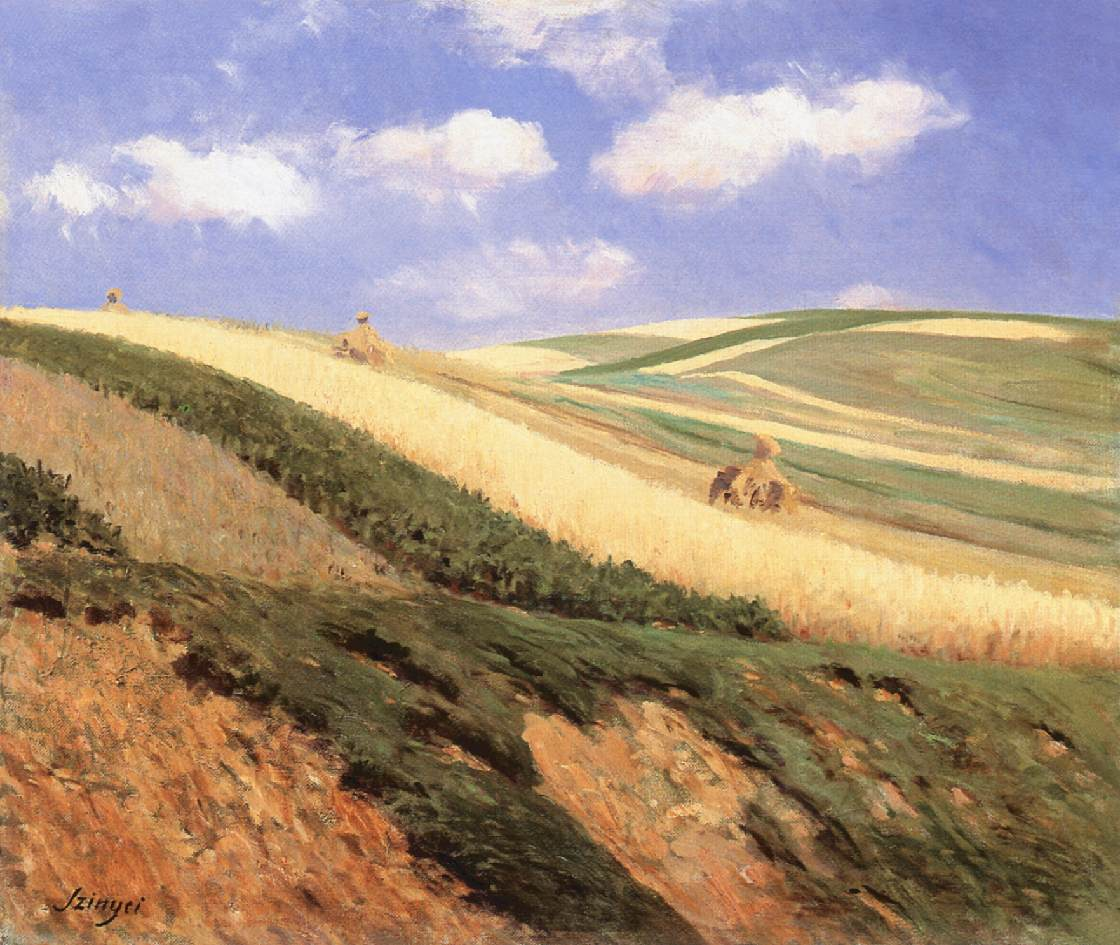
Field (1909)

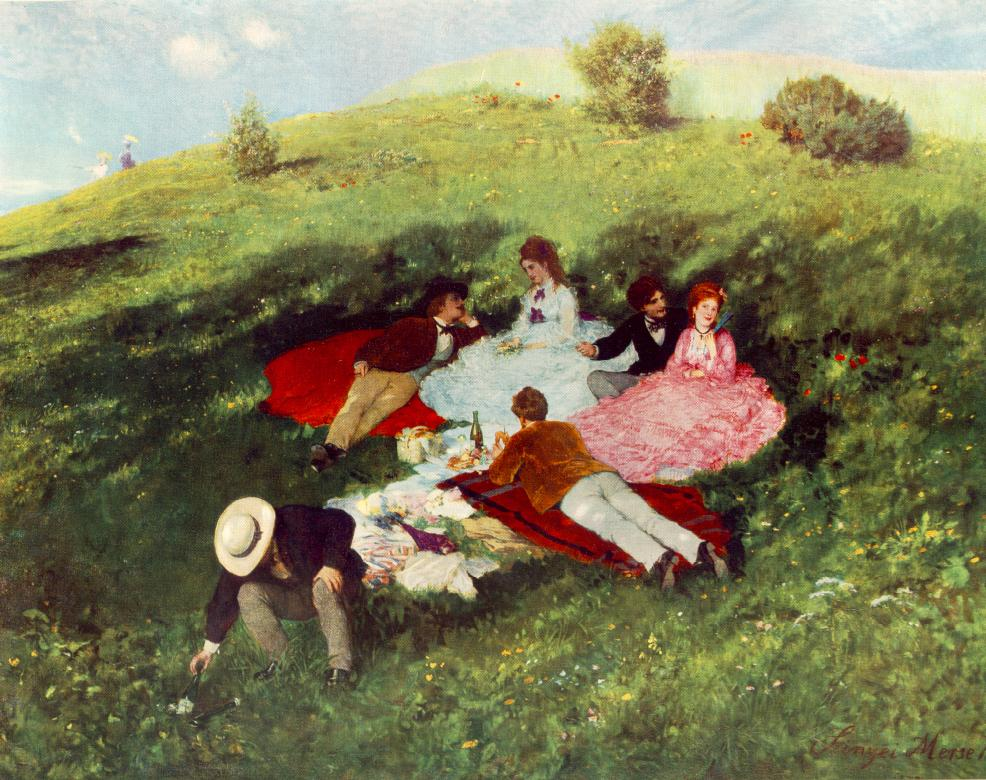
Picnic in May (1873)
