= Munkácsi =

Munkácsi or Munkácsy is a Hungarian surname that means "from Munkács" (Mukachevo). Notable people with the surname include:

- Mihály Munkácsy (1844–1900), Hungarian painter
- Martin Munkácsi (1896–1963), Hungarian-American photographer
- Ernő Munkácsi (1896-1950), Hungarian Jewish jurist and writer
