= Volkswagen Golf Mk1 =

First generation of Golf compact car

Volkswagen Golf Mk1 (Type 17)
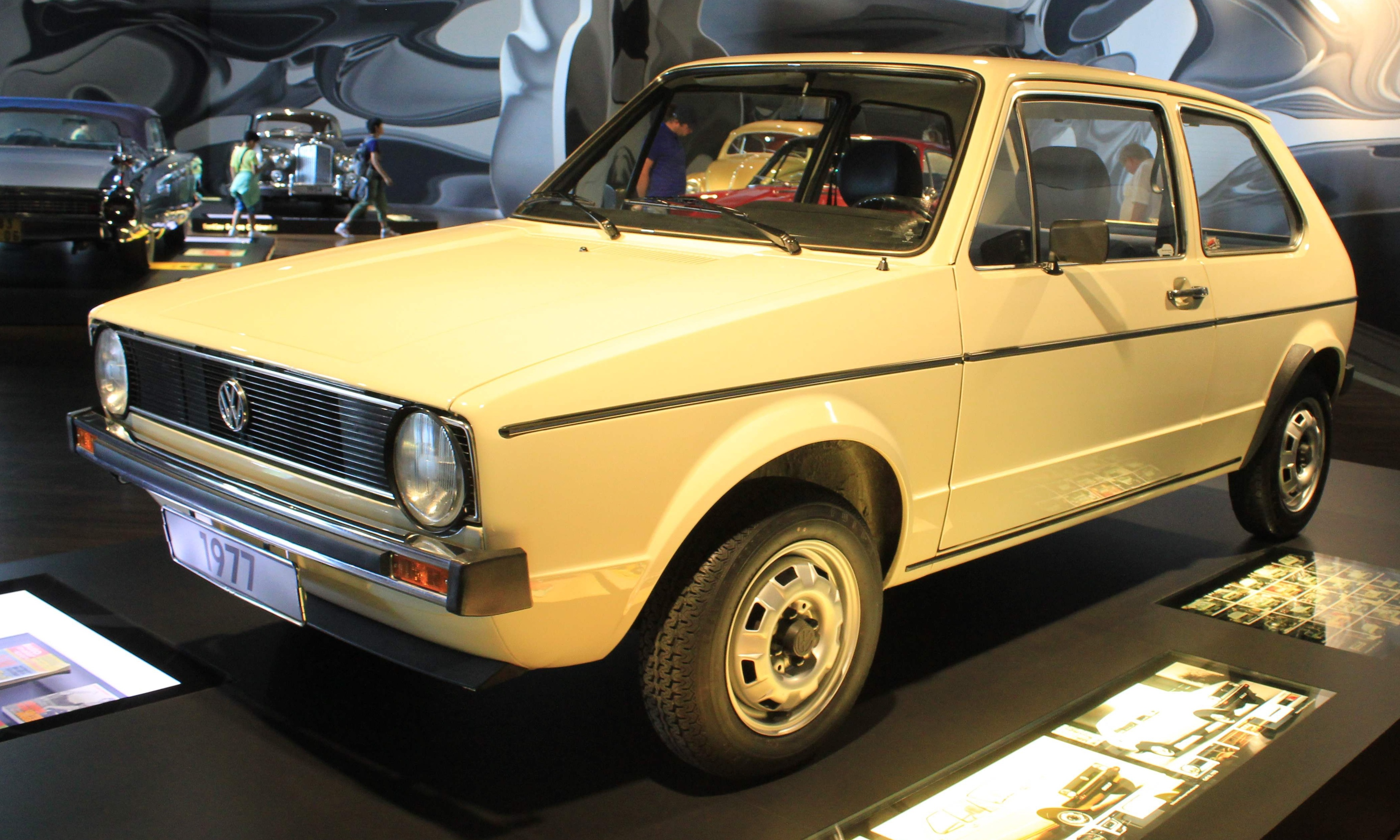
- 1977 Volkswagen Golf I at the Autostadt ("ZeitHaus" exhibitions section) in Wolfsburg, Germany

Overview
- Manufacturer: Volkswagen
- Also called: Volkswagen Rabbit (US/Canada); Volkswagen Caribe (Mexico); Volkswagen Citi Golf (South Africa)
- Production: May 1974 – September 1983; 1976–1985 (Yugoslavia); 1979–April 1993 (Cabriolet); 1978–2009 (South Africa); 1977–1987 (Mexico)
- Assembly: Germany: Wolfsburg; Australia: Clayton; Belgium: Brussels; United States: New Stanton, Pennsylvania (Westmoreland Assembly); South Africa: Uitenhage; Malaysia: Shah Alam; Mexico: Puebla; Yugoslavia: Sarajevo (TAS)
- Designer: Giorgetto Giugiaro at Italdesign

Body and chassis
- Class: Small family car (C)
- Body style: 3/5-door hatchback; 2-door pickup truck; 2-door convertible
- Layout: FF layout
- Platform: Volkswagen Group A1 platform
- Related: Volkswagen Jetta; Volkswagen Caddy; Volkswagen Scirocco

Powertrain
- Engine: Petrol engines: Global; 1.1L 50 PS (37 kW) I4; 1.3L 60 PS (44 kW) I4; 1.5L 70 PS (51 kW) I4; 1.6L 75 PS (55 kW) I4; 1.6L 110 PS (81 kW) EG I4 (GTI); 1.8L 112 PS (82 kW) DX I4 (GTI/GLI); USA/Canada/Japan: 1.5L 70 hp (52 kW) I4 (MY 1975); 1.6L 60 hp (45 kW) I4 (Pickup); 1.6L 71 hp (53 kW) I4 (MY 1976); 1.6L 78 hp (58 kW) I4 (MY 1977); 1.5L 71 hp (53 kW) I4 (MY 1978/79); 1.5L 62 hp (46 kW) I4 (MY 1980); 1.6L 76 hp (57 kW) I4 (MY 1980); 1.7L 74 hp (55 kW) I4 (MY 1981/82); 1.7L 65 hp (48 kW) I4 (MY 1983/84); 1.8L 90 hp (67 kW) I4 (GTI MY 1983/84); Diesel engines: 1.5L 50 PS (37 kW) I4; 1.6L 54 PS (40 kW) I4; 1.6L 70 PS (51 kW) TD I4; USA/Canada/Japan: 1.5L 48 hp (36 kW) I4 (MY 1978–80); 1.6L 52 hp (39 kW) I4 (MY 1981–84); 1.6L 68 hp (51 kW) TD I4 (MY 1983–84)
- Transmission: 4-speed manual; 5-speed manual; 3-speed automatic

Dimensions
- Wheelbase: 2,400 mm (94.5 in), Pickup: 2,625 mm (103.3 in)
- Length: 3,705 mm (145.9 in), later 3,815 mm (150.2 in), USA 155.3 in (3,945 mm), Pickup: 4,380 mm (172.4 in)
- Width: 1,610 mm (63.4 in), later 1,630 mm (64.2 in), Pickup: 1,640 mm (64.6 in)
- Height: Saloon: 1,395 mm (54.9 in), Cabrio: 1,412 mm (55.6 in), Pickup: 1,490 mm (58.7 in)
- Curb weight: 790–970 kg (1,741.7–2,138.5 lb), USA 1,750–2,145 lb (794–973 kg)

Chronology
- Predecessor: Volkswagen Beetle
- Successor: Volkswagen Golf Mk2

The Volkswagen Golf Mk1 is the first generation of a small family car manufactured and marketed by Volkswagen. It was noteworthy for signalling Volkswagen's shift of its major car lines from rear-wheel drive and rear-mounted air-cooled engines to front-wheel drive with front-mounted, water-cooled engines that were often transversely-mounted.

The successor to Volkswagen's Beetle, the first generation Golf debuted in Europe in May 1974 with styling by Giorgetto Giugiaro's Italdesign. The car was sold as the Volkswagen Rabbit in the United States and Canada, and as the Caribe in Mexico.

== History ==
=== Replacing the Beetle; early efforts ===
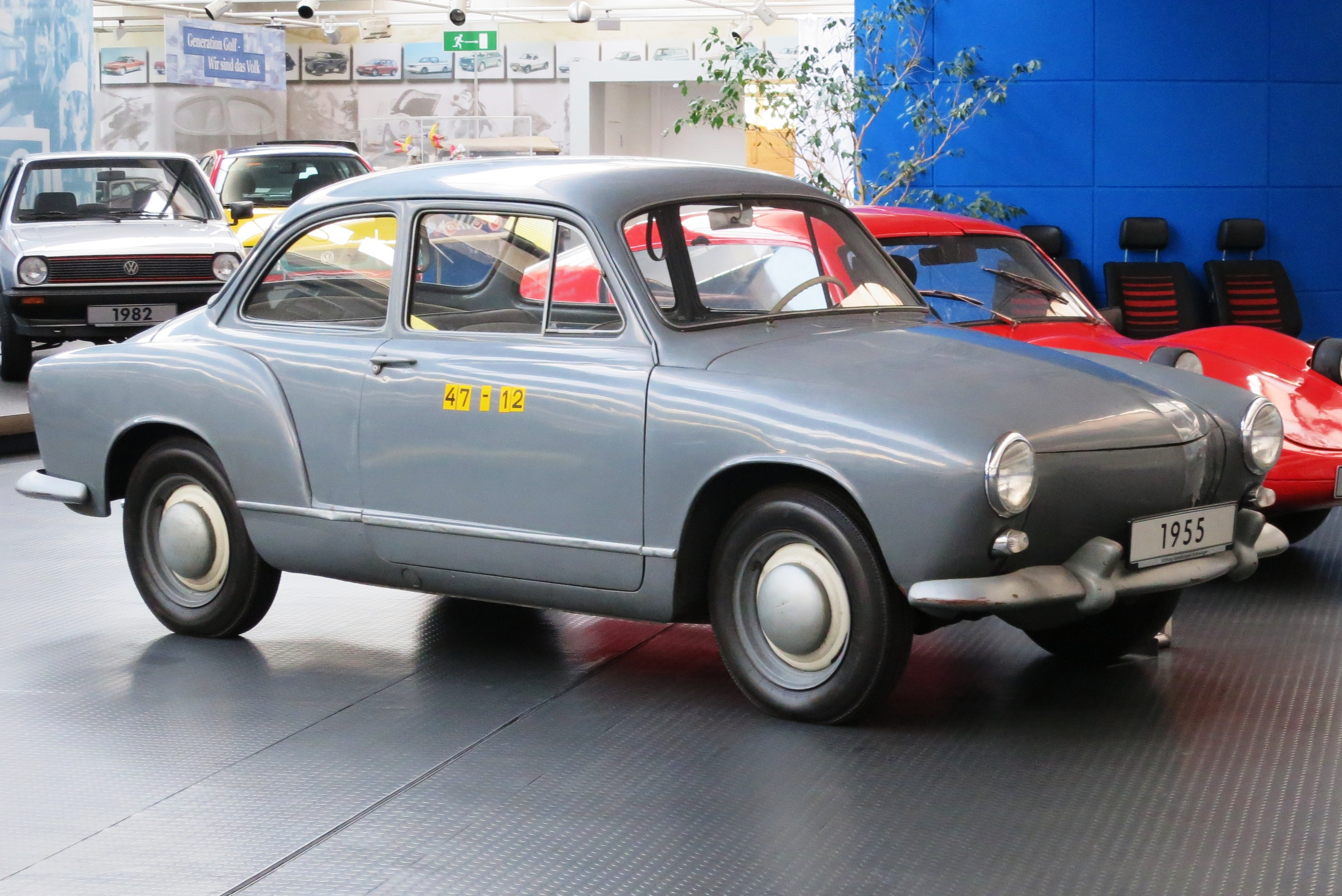
Volkswagen EA47 prototype (1953/55)

Volkswagen began producing prototypes of possible Beetle replacements as far back as the early 1950s, and may have received design proposals from Porsche earlier than that. All of the internal projects' names started with "EA", standing for "Entwicklungsauftrag" ("Development assignment"). This work began during the tenure of Heinz Nordhoff, director general of Volkswagen from 1948 to 1968.

In 1952, the company built the EA41 in collaboration with Pininfarina. Essentially a rebodied Beetle, it never went into production.

The first EA47 prototype appeared in 1953; at least 11 more EA47 variations were built over the next three years.

By the mid- to late-1950s, questions about the future of the Beetle began to be asked from outside the company. In 1957, an article with the title "Is the Volkswagen dated?" appeared in the West German magazine Stern. Two years later, a similar headline was used in an article in Der Spiegel.

In 1958, Porsche began a project numbered 728 for a revised Beetle. A few years later, this became the Volkswagen EA53. This project continued for a number of years and produced several prototypes, with early ones having bodywork designed by Porsche and later ones styled by Ghia. The EA53 eventually led to the Type 3 model.

In 1957, another design study, the EA97, was started. This exercise was larger than the Beetle, but kept the usual rear-mounted powertrain. Two hundred instances of this design were built. Styling varied, depending on whether a particular car's bodywork was done by VW or by Ghia. Some cars’ looks echo the later Type 3 cars, although the EA97 was smaller. The last EA97 was built in 1960. The EA97 would provide the basis for the Brasília model from Volkswagen do Brasil.

The EA158 was a Beetle-successor project that started in 1962 with a unibody study by Pininfarina. As the project progressed, the car grew in size and weight. It was eventually rejected as a Beetle replacement, but served as the foundation of the subsequent Volkswagen Type 4 model.

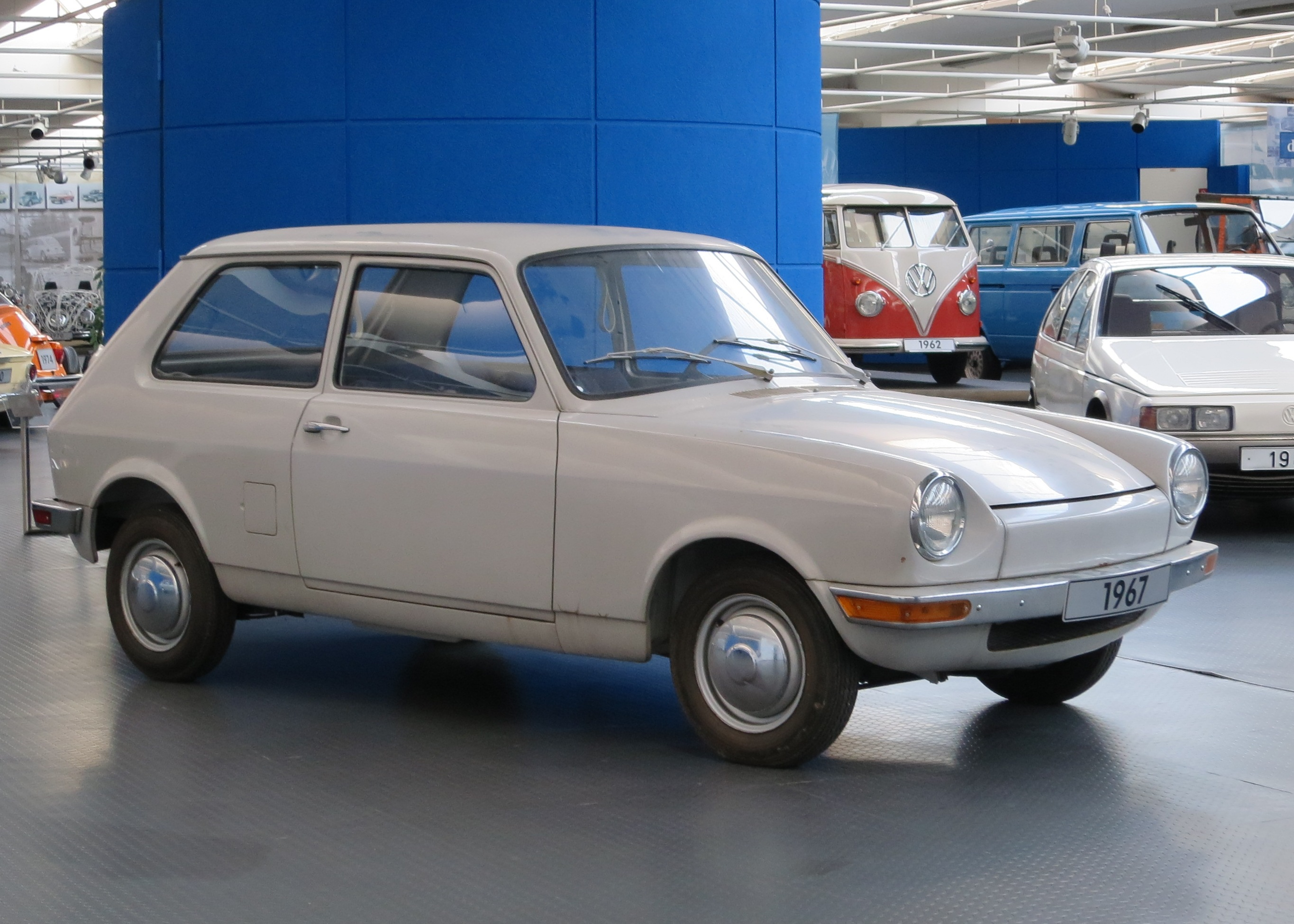
Volkswagen EA235 prototype (1967)

In 1967, another set of prototypes for possible Beetle replacements appeared in the form of the EA235 and EA235a.

In 1968, the last internal prototype for a Beetle replacement built under Nordhoff's direction appeared. This car, designated EA276, was a small three-door hatchback with front-wheel drive using a front-mounted Volkswagen air-cooled engine. The EA276 program was cancelled after the death of Nordhoff, but found new life as the inspiration for the Brazilian Gol.

During Nordhoff's tenure, VW broadened its product line with the launch of the Volkswagen Type 3 in 1961 and the Volkswagen Type 4 in 1968. In 1964, the company acquired control of the Auto Union group from Daimler-Benz, and with it the technologies of the constituent companies of DKW, Horch, Audi and Wanderer.

=== Corporate changes and later prototypes ===
Kurt Lotz succeeded Nordhoff as director general of Volkswagen from 1968 to 1971. Work to broaden the product line and find a replacement for the Beetle accelerated. Volkswagen acquired control of NSU in 1969. NSU was subsequently merged into the Auto Union group, which was then undergoing a renaissance under the relaunched Audi brand. One outcome of this acquisition was that the mid-sized front-wheel drive car that had been under development at NSU would reach the market, not as an NSU, but as the Volkswagen K70.

In 1968, another development project started, known as EA266. This project originated with Porsche, where it began as an internal project as early as 1966. This unusual design used a rear mid-engine, rear-wheel-drive layout with a water-cooled inline four cylinder engine laid over on its side and mounted longitudinally under the floor of the rear of the passenger compartment.

In 1969, a year after the start of work at Volkswagen on the EA266, another project, known as EA337, was commissioned. This project would draw on engines and front-wheel drive technology from the Audi division of Auto Union.

=== Entering difficult times ===
In 1966, Volkswagen built almost 1.5 million automobiles and reported net profits of DM 300,000,000. By 1967, domestic sales had fallen to 370,000 units from a high of 600,000 units in 1965. A government-backed economic stimulus package was able to produce a rebound in sales. Beetle exports to the United States went from 232,550 in 1963 to 423,008 in 1968.

Local competitors Ford-Werke and Opel launched new small car models (the Escort and Kadett, respectively) targeted directly at Volkswagen's traditional market. Volkswagen's share of the German domestic car market dropped from 45% in 1960 to 26% in 1972. VW's profits fell from a high of DM 330,000,000 in 1969 to DM 12,000,000 in 1971, mainly due to slumping Beetle sales and high R&D costs.

In 1971, the United States government ended international convertibility of the US dollar to gold in what is termed the Nixon shock. One outcome of this was that the Deutsche Mark rose 40% against the US dollar in 1971. This, combined with a 10% import duty on cars entering the US, caused Beetle sales to plummet in what had become a critical market for Volkswagen. In 1973, the OPEC oil crisis hit, triggering a global recession. The German government responded with emergency measures banning private car use on certain days of the week and comprehensive speed limits.

In 1972, Opel's share of the German market rose to 20.4%, making them Germany's largest automobile manufacturer and overtaking Volkswagen in their domestic market. That same year, the Center for Auto Safety published "Small—on safety: the designed-in dangers of the Volkswagen", which examined the safety deficiencies of the Beetle just as Ralph Nader's earlier book Unsafe at Any Speed had done for the Chevrolet Corvair. All of the foregoing combined to result in Volkswagen posting a DM 807,000,000 loss in 1974. That same year, Volkswagen of America alone posted a DM 200,000,000 loss.

Rudolf Leiding replaced Lotz as director general of Volkswagen from 1971 to 1975. Commenting on the situation at Volkswagen as he found it, Leiding said: "The global situation for VW was more critical than we had once thought – to put it simply, we were dealing with the survival of a giant group, which employed more than 220,000 people worldwide ..." Two weeks after assuming the directorship, Leiding stopped work on the Porsche-designed EA266 and ordered all but two of the 50 prototypes built to that point to be disassembled.

In 1969, Lotz and Italian Volkswagen importer Gerhard R. Gumpert visited the Turin Auto Show. After selecting their six favourite cars of the show, they discovered that four of the six were designed by Giorgetto Giugiaro and his Italdesign studio. In January 1970, Giugiaro was invited to Wolfsburg to work on development project EA337. The first thing he saw when he arrived at VW's research centre was a Fiat 128, completely disassembled and labelled. The design brief provided by Volkswagen specified a C-segment car with a two-box body in three- and five-door versions. The client also provided Giugiaro with the basic dimensions and the power-train options. Giugiaro produced a design that reflected his signature "origami" or "folded-paper" style, emphasizing sharp corners and flat planes. Giugiaro would come to consider the Mk1 Golf the most important design of his career.

Early prototypes included rectangular headlamps and wide tail-lamp assemblies. At least one pre-production car was modified with a sliding side door. During development, candidates for the name of the new car included "Blizzard" and "Caribe", but these lost out to the final choice of "Golf". The origin of the name is variously attributed to the game of golf, the Gulf Stream current (German Golfstrom) or the name of a horse.

== Model history ==
The Golf Mk1 received VW model designation Type 17. Production started in March 1974, and sales officially began in Europe in May of that year. By this time, Giugiaro's rectangular headlamps and wide tail-lamps had given way to round headlamps and much narrower rear lamps. On these earliest cars, the lower horizontal bodyline running under the tail-lamps on the rear hatch dropped down in the location of the rear license plate. This feature has been dubbed "Swallowtail" by some Golf enthusiasts. The surface between the raised sides on the bonnet on early cars also blended smoothly into the leading edge.

The Golf was not the first example of Giugiaro's work for Volkswagen to reach production. His design for the first generation Passat was released in 1973, and the first generation Scirocco, a Giugiaro design prepared concurrently with the Golf, was released months ahead of the Golf.

From 2 October 1974 to 14 January 1975, two Golf Mk1s were driven over 30,500 km (19,000 mi) from Fairbanks, Alaska to Tierra del Fuego as a test of their durability.

The right-hand drive Golf went on sale in the United Kingdom in October 1974. For the 1975 sales year, it was the 14th best-selling car in the UK, with more than 19,000 units sold. In 1981, the facelifted Golf GTI was voted Car of the Year by What Car? magazine, ahead of new models like the Austin Metro and MK3 Ford Escort. In its final sales year of 1983, it sold more than 25,000 units, and was the UK's 14th best-selling car, despite being almost 10 years old.

Air conditioning became available as an option on the domestic market in August 1975. The ability to retrofit the system, together with installing a larger battery, was offered to owners of existing cars.

In December 1975, a minor styling revision deleted the Swallowtail line on the rear hatch, replacing it with a simple straight horizontal body-line. The bonnet also received a transverse line connecting the two raised sides across the front edge of the panel.

The Golf was introduced to Japan in 1975, where it was imported by the Yanase dealership chain. Its exterior dimensions and engine displacement were in compliance with Japanese Government dimension regulations.

The Golf Mk1 was runner-up for European Car of the Year in 1975, losing to the Citroën CX.

A minor exterior revision in December 1978 replaced the narrow front and rear bumpers with moulded units that wrapped around the sides of the car. Another minor facelift in 1980 saw the adoption of wider rear lamp clusters and a new dashboard with a more modern-looking instrument display featuring LED warning lights. US versions also received rectangular headlights. This was the last major update before the Mk1 was replaced by the Mk2 Golf in most markets in September 1983 and in the UK in March 1984.

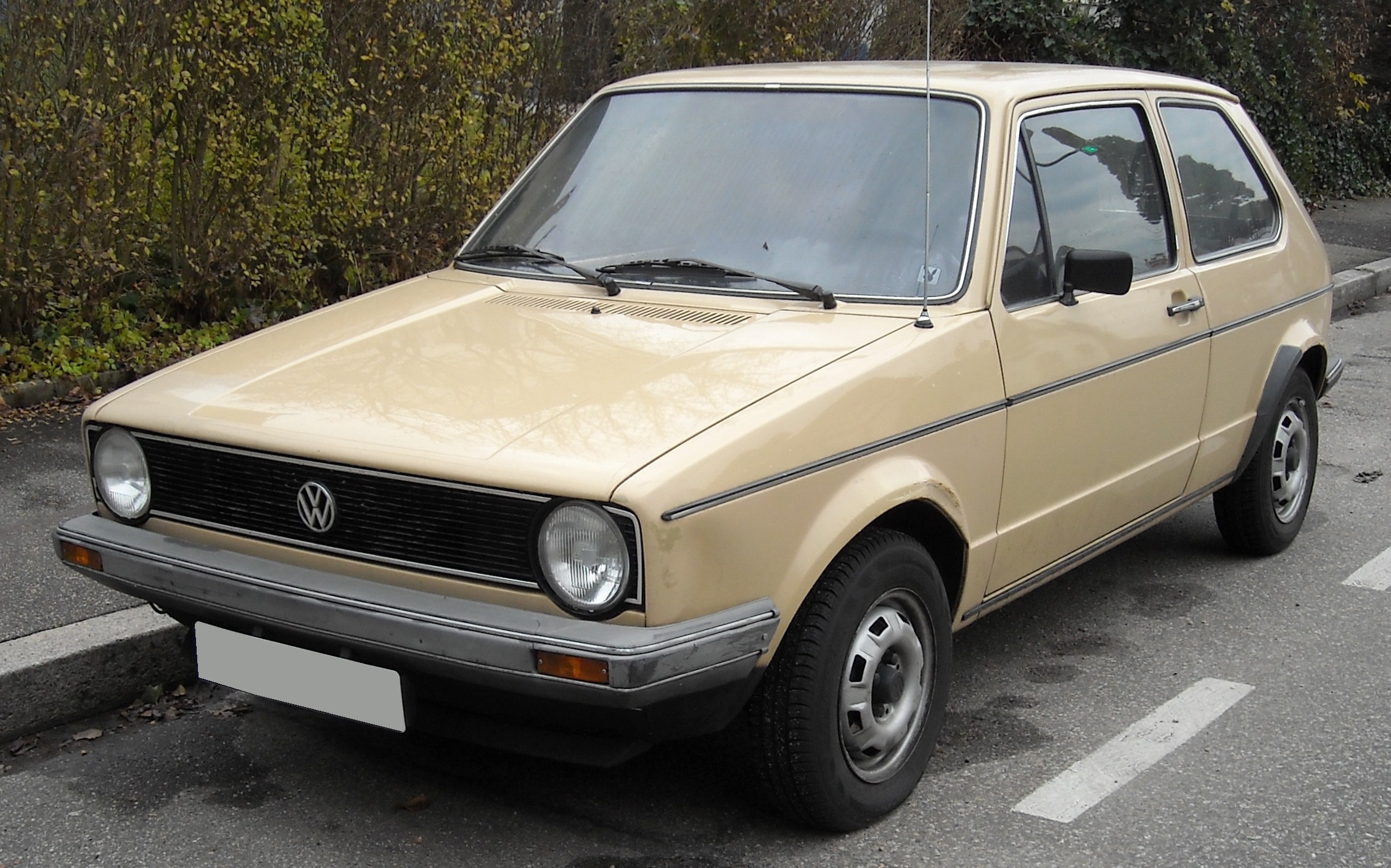
Facelifted Mk1 with and wrap-around bumpers

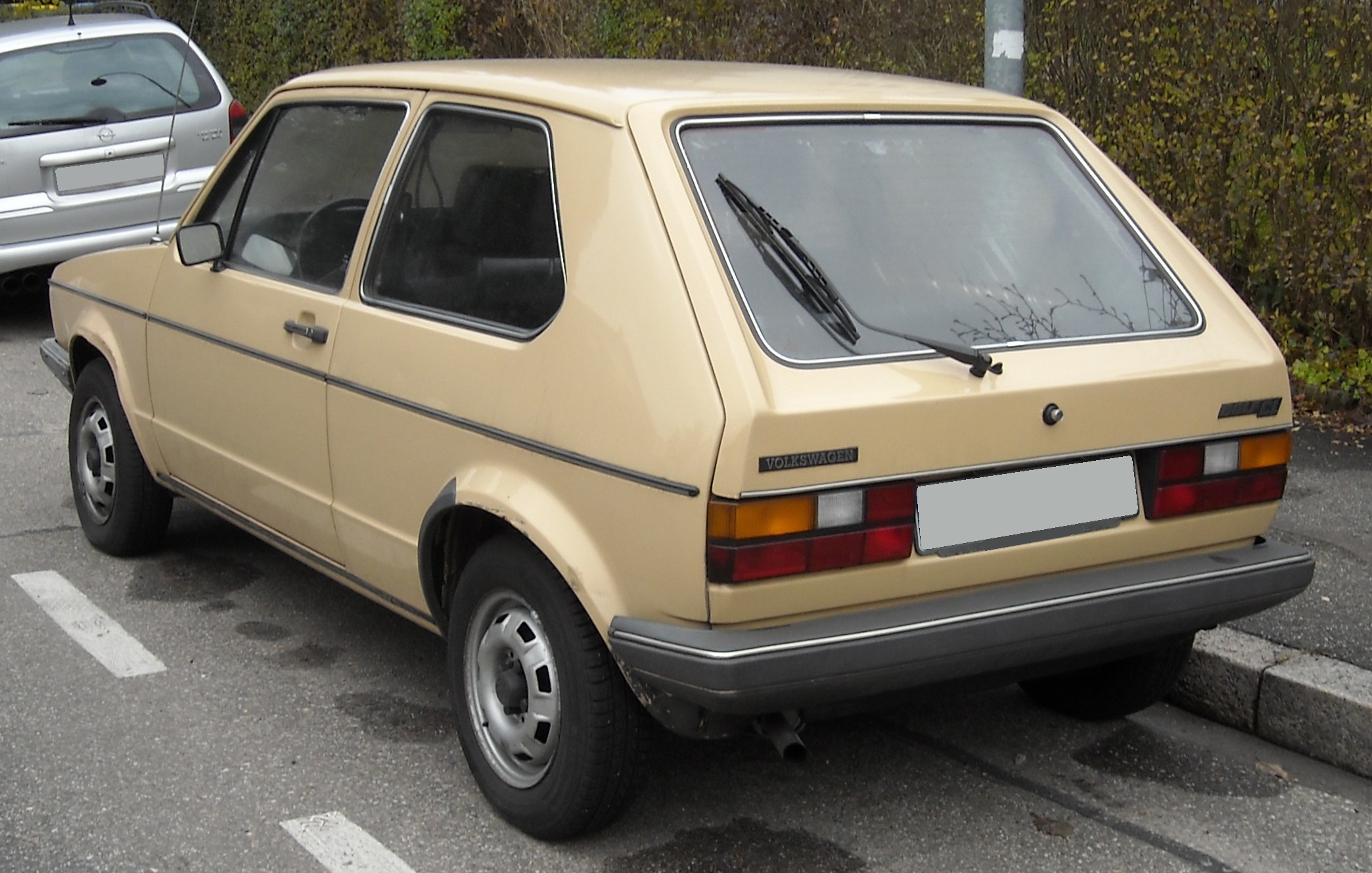
Rear view of facelifted model showing the wider rear lamp clusters

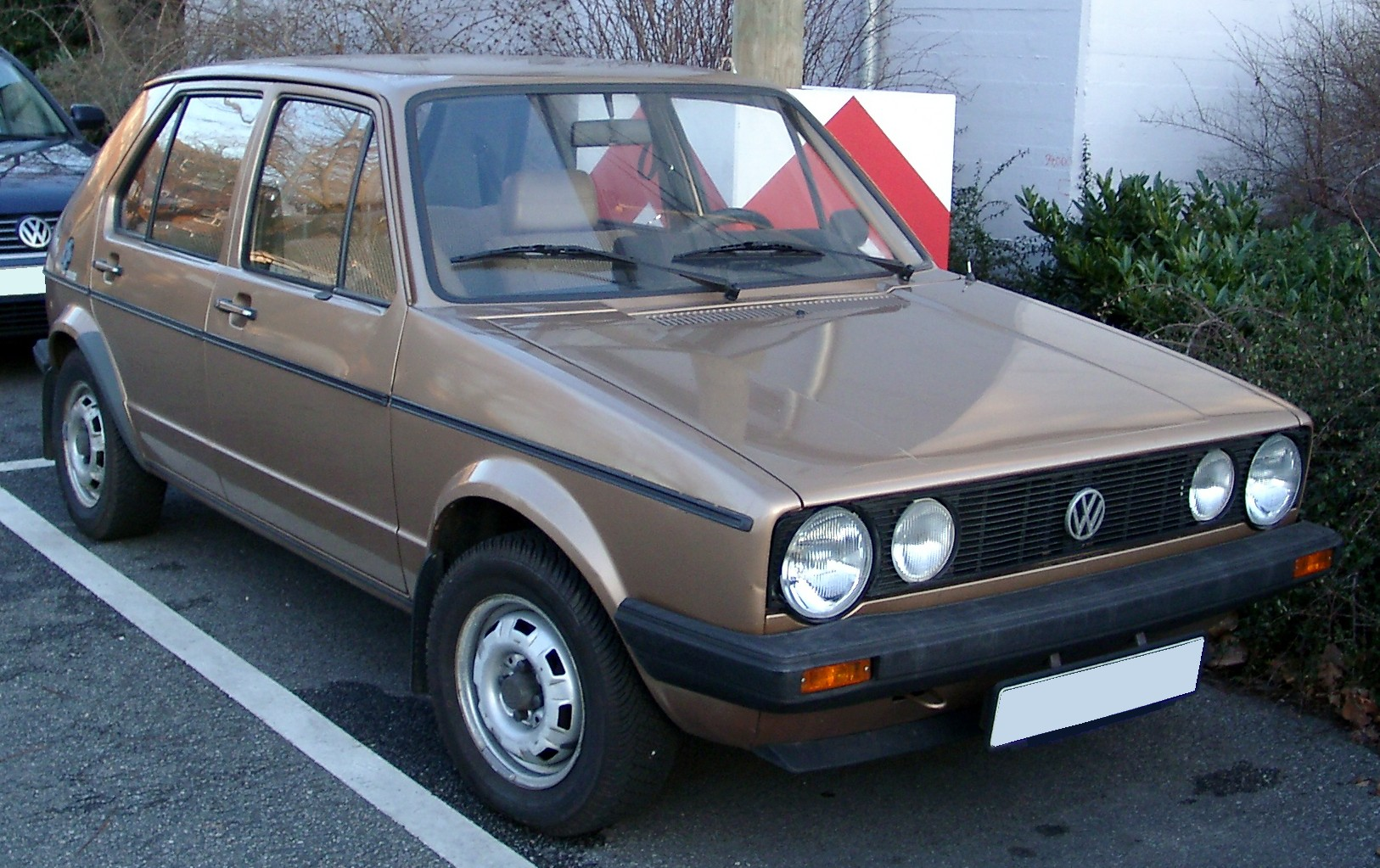
VW Golf LX with twin headlights

The Golf was West Germany's best selling new car for much of its production life, and was among the most successful cars in the whole of Europe during its nine-year production run.

== Features ==
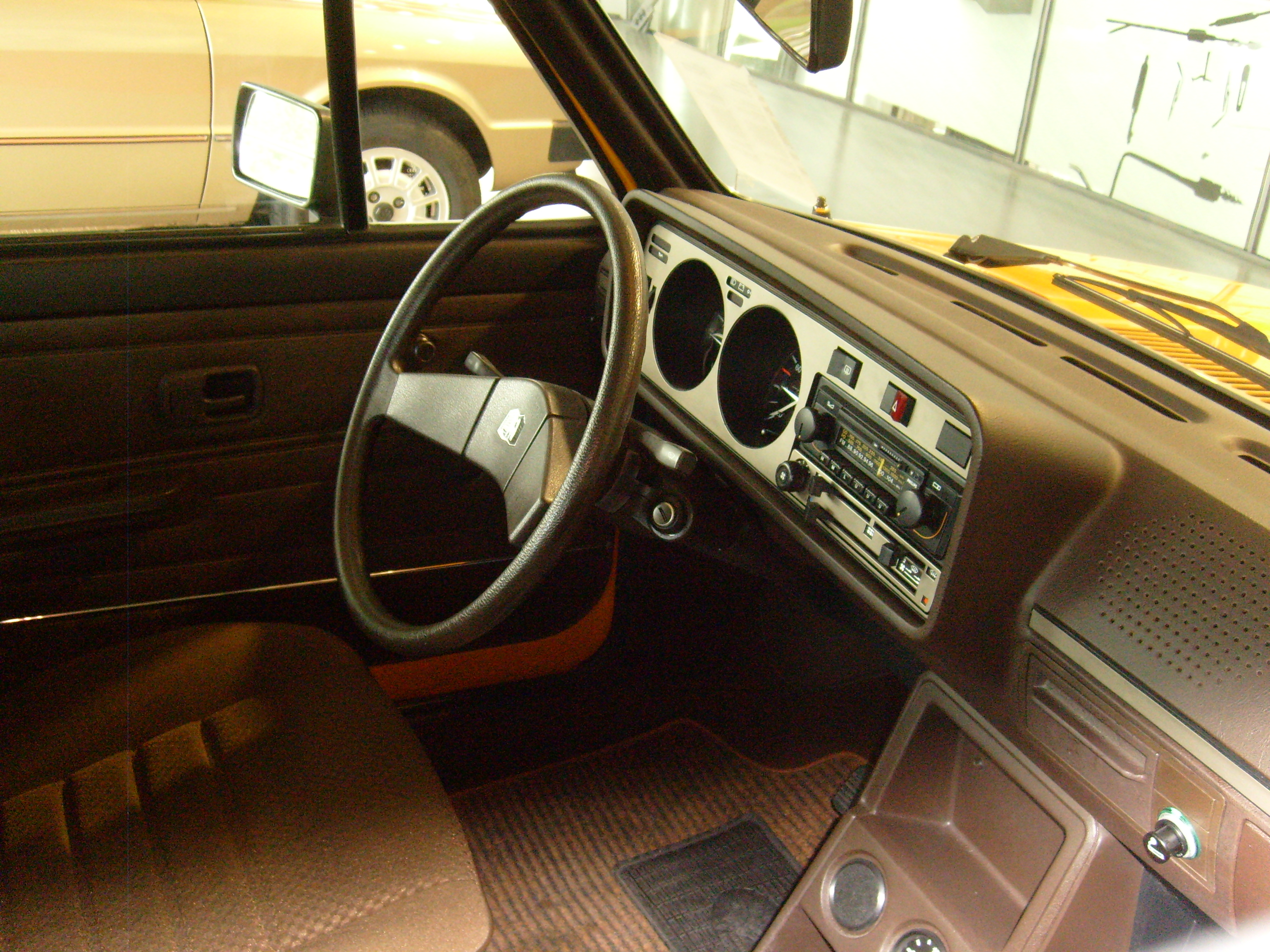
1979 Golf interior

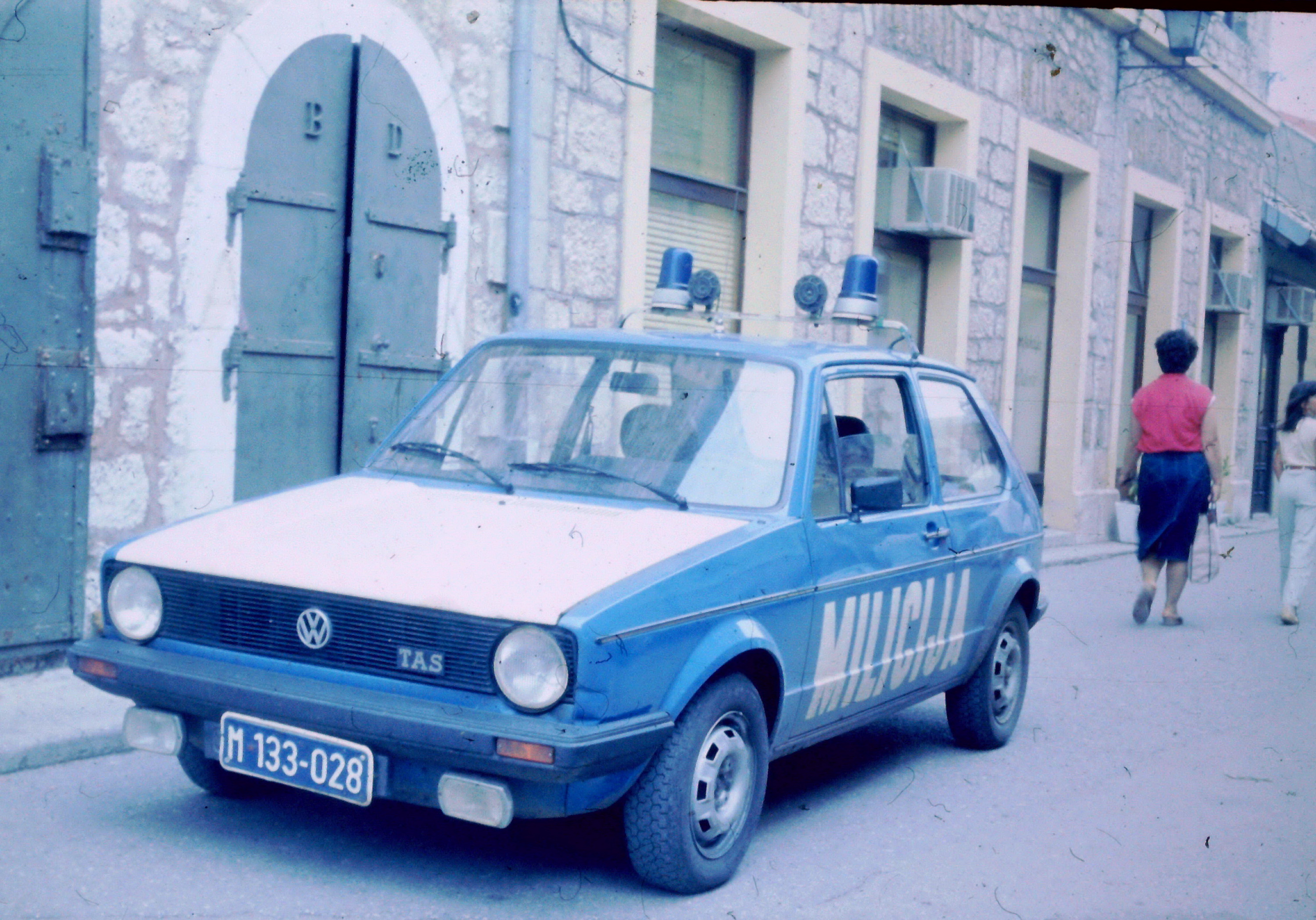
The Mk1 Golf was used in the former SFR Yugoslavia as a police car, especially in SR Bosnia and Herzegovina. Here is an example seen in Mostar in 1985.

The Golf adopted an efficient "two-box" layout with a steep hatchback rather than a formal trunk. The chassis was a steel unibody. The car's engine was mounted transversely in the front, and drove the front wheels. Engines from two Audi engine families were offered. Both were water cooled inline four cylinder four-stroke engines. Both also had two valves per cylinder operated by a single-overhead camshaft driven by a timing belt. The early engines used 2 barrel Zenith carburetors. The 1.1-litre and 1.3-litre engines were from the original EA111 line. In this engine the valves were operated by rocker arms. The EA111 was mounted with a 20° forward tilt. The 1.5-litre, 1.6-litre and 1.8-litre engines were from the EA827 family. In this engine, the valves were operated by bucket tappets. The EA827s were mounted tilted 15° rearwards. The car was originally available with two transmission options: a four-speed manual and a three-speed automatic. A five-speed manual became available in 1979.

The front suspension was made up of MacPherson struts and helical coil springs with lower wishbones and an anti-roll bar. The rear was semi-independent with dual trailing arms connected by a twist-beam rear suspension and coil springs over telescopic shock absorbers. Steering was by rack-and-pinion. Front brakes were 239 mm (9.4 in) disks with solid rotors. In the rear were 178 mm (7.0 in) drums. The car's tires varied with the power-train, with 145SR13 on the 1.1, and 155SR13s on the 1.3 and 1.5. Tires on the GTIs were larger, using 175/70 profile 13-inch tires.

== Technical data ==
VW Golf:	1.1 L (1974–1983)	1.1 L (Export; 1974–1979)	1.1 L Formel E (1981–1983)	1.3 L (1979–1982)	1.5 L (1974–1975)	1.5 L (1978–1983)	1.6 L (1975–1977)	GTI (1976–1982)	GTI/GLI (Cabrio) (1982–1983)	1.5 L Diesel (1976–1980)	1.6 L Diesel (1980–1983)	1.6 L Turbodiesel (1982–1983)
Engine code:	FA/GG/HB	FJ/HD	HB8	GF	FH/FD	JB	FP	EG	DX	CK	CR/JK	CY
Engine family:	EA111 Petrol				EA827 Petrol					EA827 Diesel		
Displacement:	1,093 cc (66.7 cu in)			1,272 cc (77.6 cu in)	1,471 cc (89.8 cu in)	1,457 cc (88.9 cu in)	1,588 cc (96.9 cu in)		1,781 cc (108.7 cu in)	1,471 cc (89.8 cu in)	1,588 cc (96.9 cu in)	
Bore × Stroke:	69.5 mm × 72 mm (2.7 in × 2.8 in)			75 mm × 72 mm (3.0 in × 2.8 in)	76.5 mm × 80 mm (3.0 in × 3.1 in)	79.5 mm × 73.4 mm (3.1 in × 2.9 in)	79.5 mm × 80 mm (3.1 in × 3.1 in)		81 mm × 86.4 mm (3.2 in × 3.4 in)	76.5 mm × 80 mm (3.0 in × 3.1 in)	76.5 mm × 86.4 mm (3.0 in × 3.4 in)	
Max. Power at rpm:	50 PS (37 kW) at 6,000	52 PS (38 kW) at ??	50 PS (37 kW) at 5,600	60 PS (44 kW) at 5,200	70 PS (51 kW) at 5,800	70 PS (51 kW) at 5,600	75 PS (55 kW) at 5,600	110 PS (81 kW) at 6,100	112 PS (82 kW) at 5,800	50 PS (37 kW) at 5,000	54 PS (40 kW) at 4,800	70 PS (51 kW) at 4,500
Max. Torque at rpm:	77 N⋅m (57 lb⋅ft) at 3,000	78 N⋅m (57.5 lb⋅ft) at ??	79 N⋅m (59 lb⋅ft) at 3,400	93 N⋅m (68.6 lb⋅ft) at 2,800	112 N⋅m (82.6 lb⋅ft) at 3,000	108 N⋅m (79.7 lb⋅ft) at 2,500	125 N⋅m (92.2 lb⋅ft) at 3,200	137 N⋅m (101.0 lb⋅ft) at 5,000	150 N⋅m (110.6 lb⋅ft) at 3,500	80 N⋅m (59.0 lb⋅ft) at 3,000	98 N⋅m (72.3 lb⋅ft) at 2,300	130 N⋅m (95.9 lb⋅ft) at 2,600
Compression ratio:	8.0		9.7									
Induction:	1 down-draft Solex carburetor							Electro-Mechanical injection		Distributor injection pump (TD: + turbocharger)		
Cooling:	Water-cooled											
Transmission (standard):	4-speed							4-speed (5-speed after August 1979)	5-speed	4-speed		5-speed
Transmission (optional):	–				3-speed Automatic (or 5-speed manual after August 1979)			–			3-speed Automatic	–
Front suspension:	Independent with MacPherson struts and lower wishbones											
Rear suspension:	Semi-independent Torsion beam axle with trailing arms and coil-over dampers											
Brakes:	front drum brakes until April 1975 front disc brakes (Ø 239 mm) after April 1975; Rear drums; brake booster optional until July 1981			front disc brakes (Ø 239 mm); Rear drums								
Steering:	Rack and pinion steering											
Chassis:	Steel unibody											
Track front/rear:	1,390 / 1,358 mm (54.7 / 53.5 in)							1,404 / 1,372 mm (55.3 / 54.0 in)		1,390 / 1,358 mm (54.7 / 53.5 in)		
Wheelbase:	2,400 mm (94.5 in)											
Length:	3,705 mm (145.9 in) (L: 3,725 mm (146.7 in)); 3,815 mm (150.2 in) after August 1978											
Weight:	790–930 kg (1,741.7–2,050.3 lb) (Cabriolet: 905–970 kg (1,995.2–2,138.5 lb))											
Max. speed:	138–140 km/h (86–87 mph); Cabriolet: 133 km/h (83 mph)		144 km/h (89 mph)	150 km/h (93 mph)	157–160 km/h (98–99 mph)	155–158 km/h (96–98 mph); Cabriolet: 153 km/h (95 mph)	158–162 km/h (98–101 mph)	183 km/h (114 mph); Cabriolet: 175 km/h (109 mph)	187 km/h (116 mph); Cabriolet: 180 km/h (112 mph)	141 km/h (88 mph)	138–142 km/h (86–88 mph)	160 km/h (99 mph)
0–100 km/h (0–62 mph) (seconds):	17		18	15.5	13–15	13–15; Cabriolet: 15–17	12–14	10; Cabriolet: 11	9 Cabriolet: 10.5	19	17.5–21.5	14
Fuel economy:	9.0 L/100 km (26.1 mpg_{‑US})		8.0 L/100 km (29.4 mpg_{‑US})	9.5 L/100 km (24.8 mpg_{‑US})	10.5–11.0 L/100 km (22.4–21.4 mpg_{‑US})	10.0–10.5 L/100 km (23.5–22.4 mpg_{‑US})	9.5–10.0 L/100 km (24.8–23.5 mpg_{‑US})	10.5 L/100 km (22.4 mpg_{‑US})	10.0 L/100 km (23.5 mpg_{‑US}); Cabriolet: 11.0 L/100 km (21.4 mpg_{‑US})	6.5 L/100 km (36.2 mpg_{‑US})	6.5 L/100 km (36.2 mpg_{‑US})	7.5 L/100 km (31.4 mpg_{‑US})

== Mk1 derivative models ==
=== Golf GTI ===
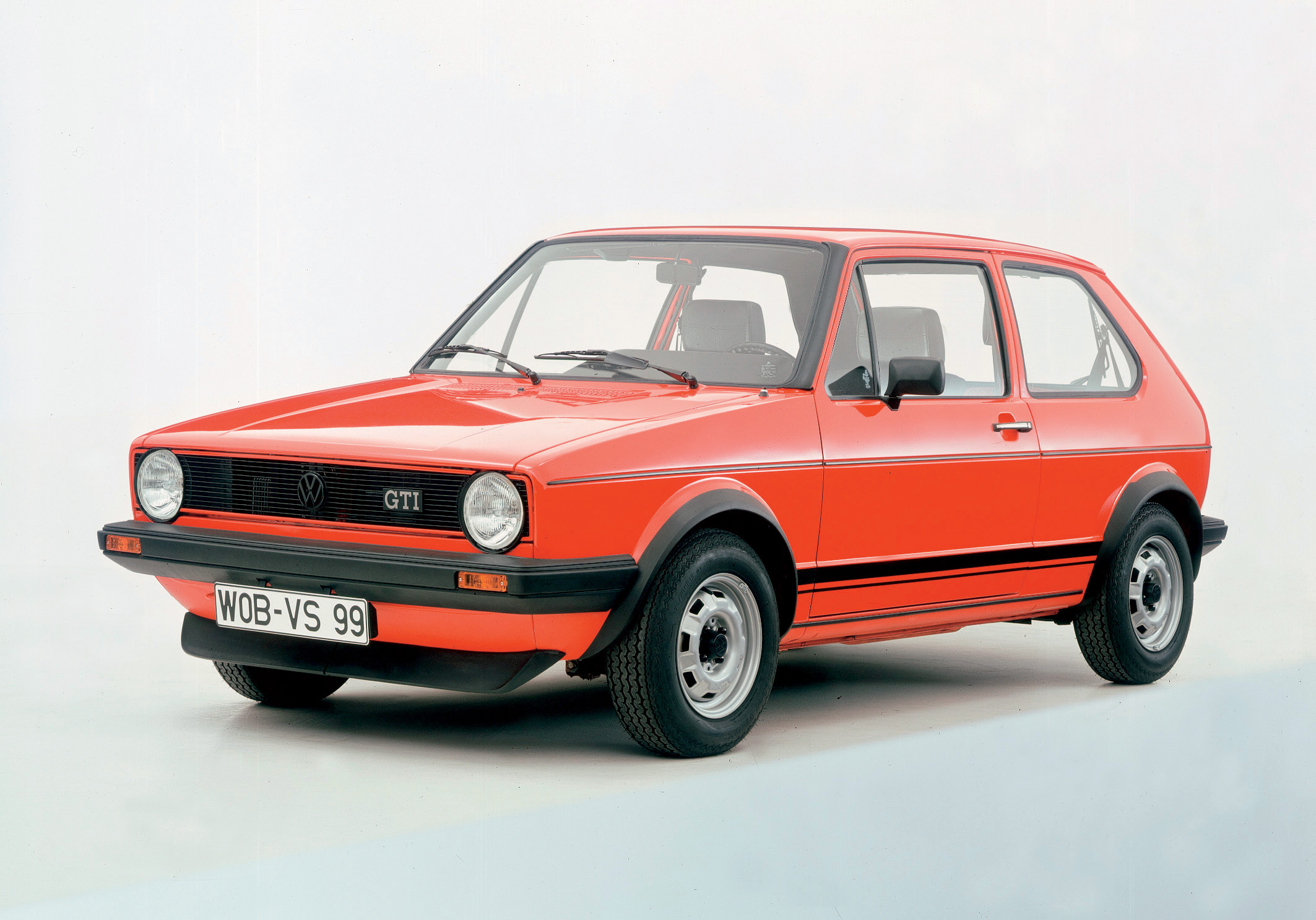
Golf GTI Mk1

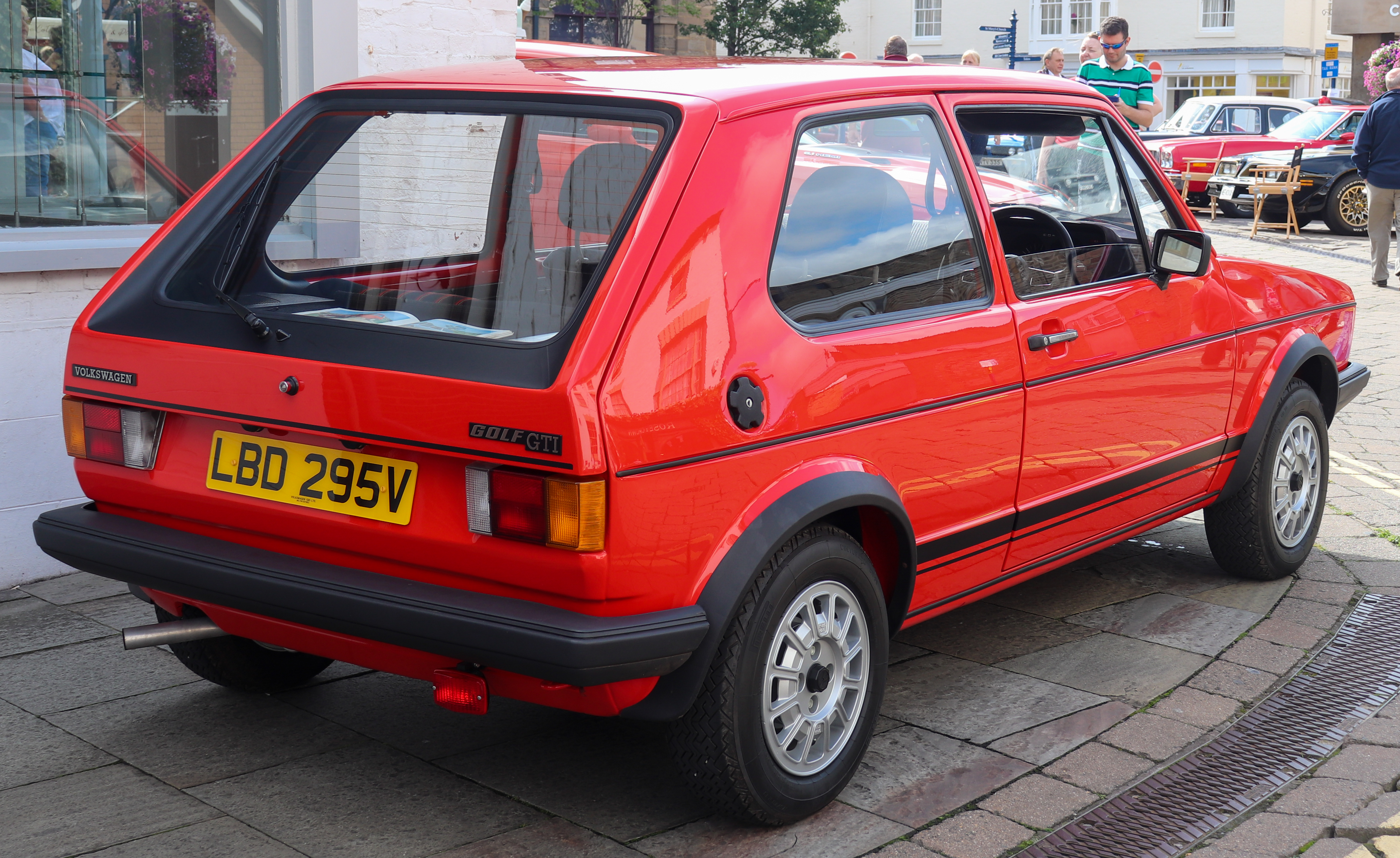
Golf GTI Mk1

Due to the negative political reaction to the 1973 release of the Beetle "Gelb-Schwarzer Renner" ("GSR", or "Yellow-Black Racer"), Volkswagen had little inclination to develop a faster Golf. VW press department head Anton Konrad and VW engineer Alfons Löwenberg began development of a high-performance "Sport Golf" as a skunkworks project rather than as an official factory program. They were joined by Gunter Kühl from the press department; suspension expert Herbert Schuster; Hermann Hablitzel, who smuggled parts from the project into regular tests; Jürgen Adler, whose chassis analysis led to additional reinforcements; Horst-Dieter Schwittlinsky from the marketing department, who coined the "GTI" acronym; and Franz Hauk, developer of the EA827 engine.

A prototype was built based on a Scirocco rather than a Golf. This proof-of-concept had an EA827 engine with dual carburetors and a lowered and stiffened suspension. When this prototype was driven by Volkswagen's chief of research Ernst Fiala, he objected to the harsh suspension and excessive noise from the intake system and declared the car "undriveable". The ad hoc development team arranged to use the fuel-injected version of the EA827 engine that had been developed for the new Audi 80 GTE. That engine's Bosch K-Jetronic system reduced intake noise and raised power output. The car's name is typically described as an acronym of either the Italian phrase "Gran Turismo Iniezione", or the English "Grand Tourer Injection", and is usually written in all capitals.

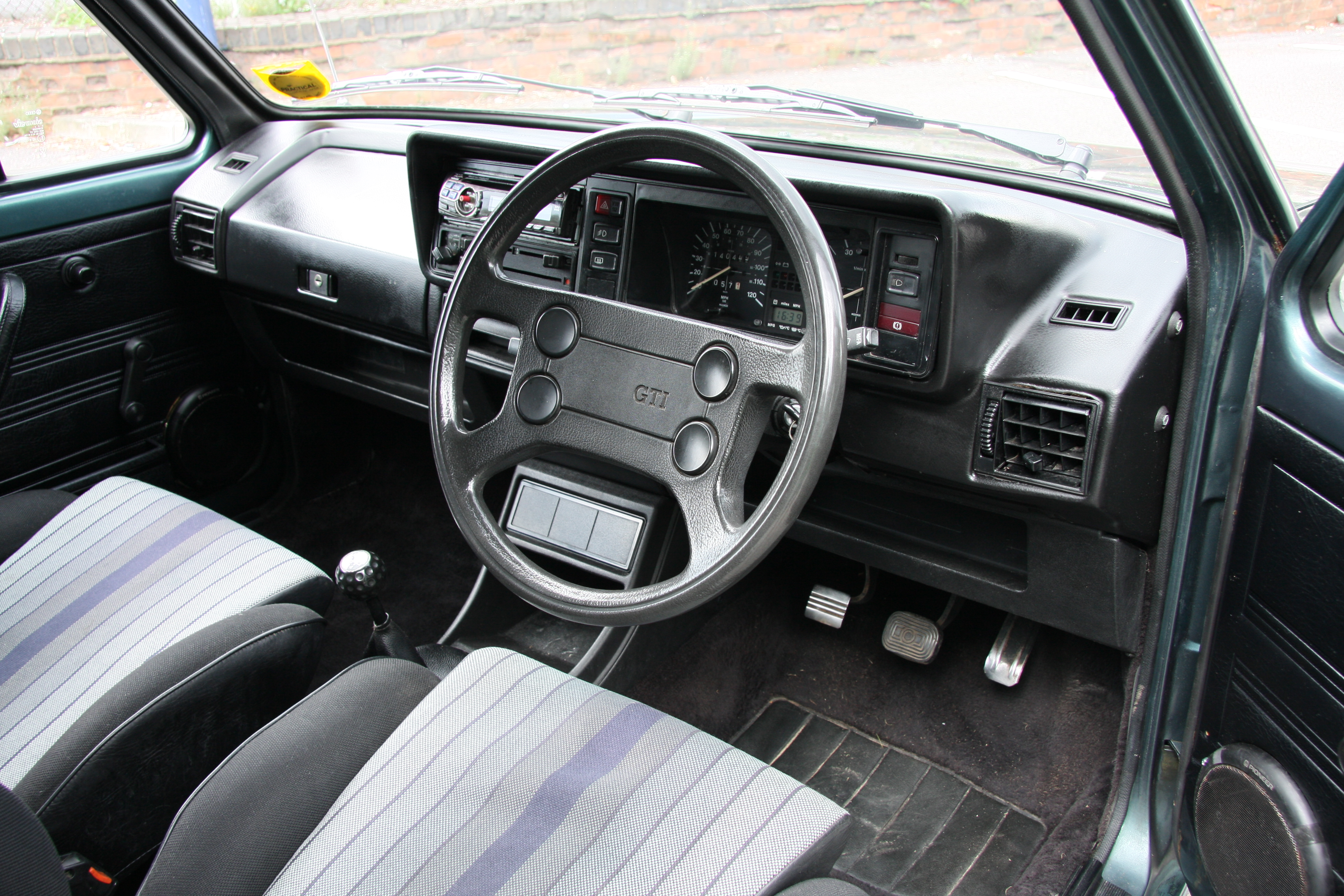
Golf GTI Mk1 interior

The GTI was presented to Volkswagen's management early in 1975, and the project was approved on 28 May 1975. At this point, a ninth person joined the original eight-member GTI team. Working under chief designer Herbert Schäfer, Gunhild Liljequist was tasked with creating a set of features that would set the GTI's interior apart from the normal Golf. Her contributions included the bright Tartan plaid upholstery, and the dimpled golf ball-like gearshift knob.

The Golf GTI debuted in September 1975 at the Frankfurt Motor Show. It was only presented to the press in late spring 1976 and available in the showroom in September of that year. Production was not expected to exceed 5000 units, which was the number needed to qualify for the Group One Production Touring Car class.

In addition to the modifications already mentioned, the GTI was distinguished from the stock Golf by external changes that included black-plastic wheel arch extensions to cover the 175/70HR13 tires on 5.5Jx13 wheels fitted, a larger front spoiler, a matte-black frame around the backlite and a red frame for the grille. Ride height was reduced by 15 mm (0.6 in), and the standard car's solid front brake discs were replaced with 9.4 in (239 mm) ventilated discs. Anti-roll bars were also fitted front and rear.

The engine in the early GTIs had a bore x stroke of 79.5 mm × 80 mm (3.13 in × 3.15 in) that displaced 1,588 cc (1.6 L; 96.9 cu in). The compression ratio had been raised to 9.5:1. This resulted in an engine that produced 110 PS (108 hp; 81 kW) at 6,100 rpm and 140 N⋅m (103 lbf⋅ft) at 5,000 rpm. This was mated to a close-ratio 4-speed manual transmission.

With a curb weight of 810 kg (1,786 lb), the GTI could accelerate from 0–100 km/h (0–62 mph) in 9.2 seconds. Top speed was 182 km/h (113.1 mph).

In August 1979, a five-speed manual transmission became standard. In 1982, the engine's bore and stroke were enlarged to 81 and 86.4 millimetres respectively, which resulted in a total displacement of 1,781 cc (108.7 cu in). Compression had also been increased to 10.0:1. Power rose to 112 PS (110.5 hp) at 5,800 rpm, and torque to 153 N⋅m (112.8 ft⋅lb) at 3,500 rpm.

The GTI appeared on the UK market in 1977 as a special order only in left-hand drive form. A factory right-hand drive version finally became available in July 1979, priced at £4705. The Rabbit GTI did not arrive in the United States until the 1983 model year.

The 1976 Volkswagen Golf GTI is considered by many to be the archetypal "hot hatch", a class of sporty small cars popular in the 1970s and early 1980s, although cars of a generally similar concept, such as the 1967 Simca 1100 Ti and the 1971 Autobianchi A112 Abarth, had appeared earlier.

Total production of Golf Mk1 GTIs eventually reached 462,000 units. In 2004, Sports Car International declared the Golf Mk1 GTI to be the third best car of the 1980s.

==== GTI special editions ====
Prior to the release of the 1.8-litre GTI, a special edition called the Golf GTI 16 S Oettinger was available in France and Switzerland. GTIs were shipped to the Oettinger factory in Friedrichsdorf where they received, among other modifications, a 16-valve double-overhead cam cylinder head. The resulting engine developed 100 kW (136 PS).

After the GTI was upgraded to 1.8-litres, special factory editions of the model were sold under different names in several European countries. These were distinguished externally by a quad-lamp front grille, tinted glass, factory sliding sunroof and Pirelli P 6Jx14 alloy wheels. The interior featured a leather-wrapped steering wheel, internal mirror adjusters and the MFA trip computer system.

The names of these editions, by country were:

- GTI Campaign (UK)
- GTI Pirelli (Germany)
- GTI Plus (France)
- GTI Trophy (Switzerland)
- GTI Special (Sweden, but without Pirelli wheels, these were fitted with Avus 14" rims)

Two additional special editions of the GTI were available in France and Norway. One was called the Golf GTI Rabbit. This model was a GTI with some normally standard equipment deleted, making it less expensive than the regular GTI.

=== Golf Diesel ===
A Golf powered by a normally aspirated diesel engine first appeared in September 1976. Equipping a compact car with a heavier, noisier and less powerful diesel engine was unusual in Germany at the time, with Peugeot among the few competitors offering a comparable model. The 1.5 litre Golf Diesel, which used fuel at the rate of 6.5 L/100 km (36.2 mpg_{‑US}), was one of the most fuel-efficient compact cars of the 1970s.

The diesel engine was derived from the existing EA827 Audi petrol engine. To withstand the higher stresses imposed by the diesel conversion, many engine components, including the cooling system, crankshaft, connecting rods, pistons and piston pins, cylinder head and timing belt, were reinforced or otherwise redesigned. Swirl chambers were added to the cylinder head. In the place previously occupied by the ignition distributor was a vacuum pump for the brake booster. The diesel injection pump was driven by the camshaft drive belt. The diesel engine was no larger than the 1.5-litre gasoline engine.

Early diesel engines had a displacement of 1.5-litres, and developed the same 37 kW (50 PS; 49 hp) as the 1.3-litre petrol engine. Later engines displaced 1.6-litres and produced 40 kW (54 PS; 53 hp). The noise, vibration, and harshness (NVH) characteristics of the early diesels were still unsatisfactory. When the turbocharged 51 kW (70 PS; 69 hp) diesel engine appeared, the turbo not only boosted the power output, but dampened engine noise as well.

=== Rabbit Pickup/VW Caddy ===
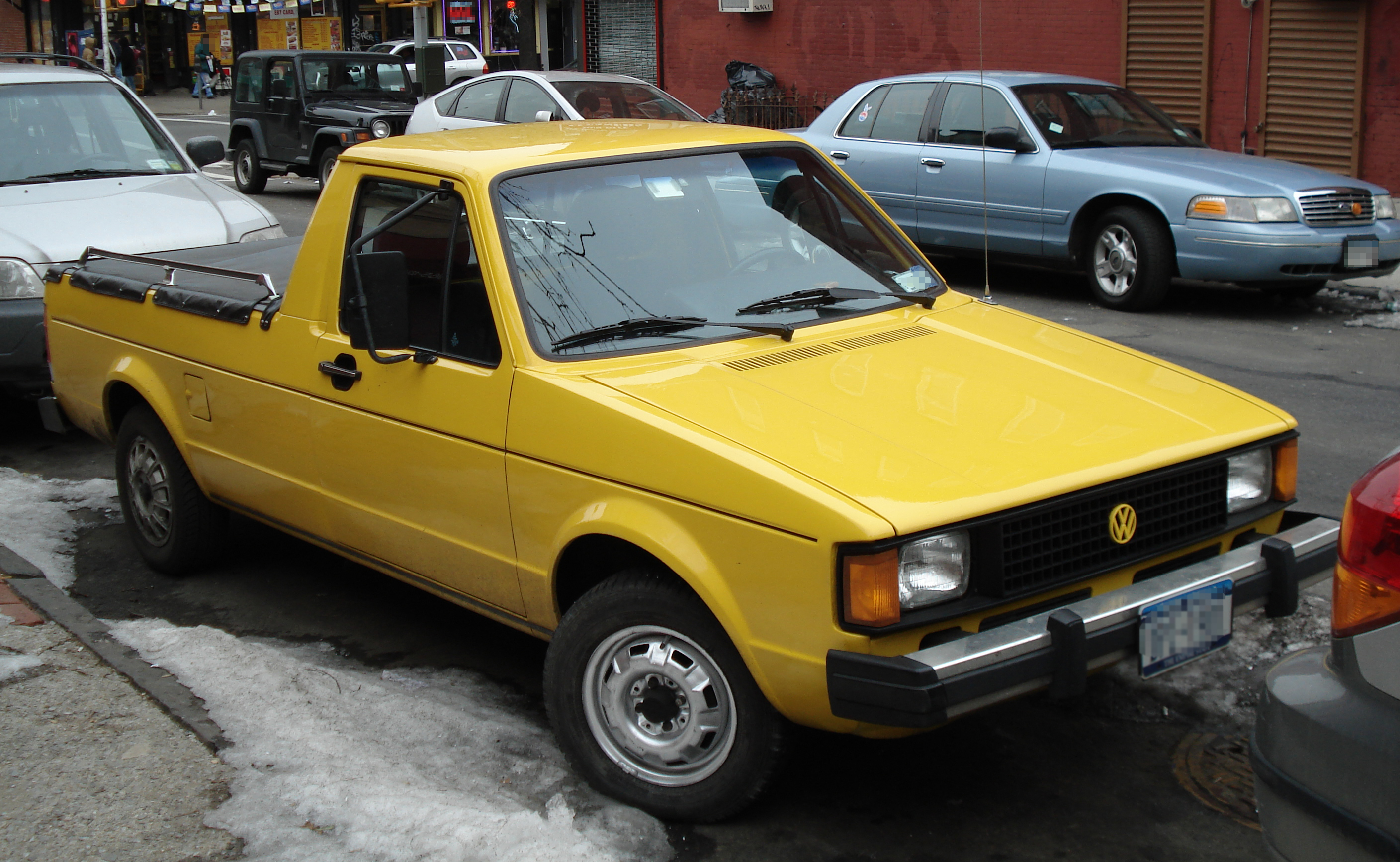
VW Rabbit Pickup

A Golf-derived utility model with a pickup truck style rear bed was developed for the American market. This Mk1 variant was called the Rabbit Pickup in the US, and entered production in 1978 at the Westmoreland plant. An almost identical version for Europe called the VW Caddy went into production in 1982 at the Tvornica Automobila Sarajevo (TAS) plant in Vogošća near Sarajevo, Yugoslavia. Approximately 200,000 units were produced at this location until the factory was destroyed in 1992 during the Bosnian War.

=== Jetta ===
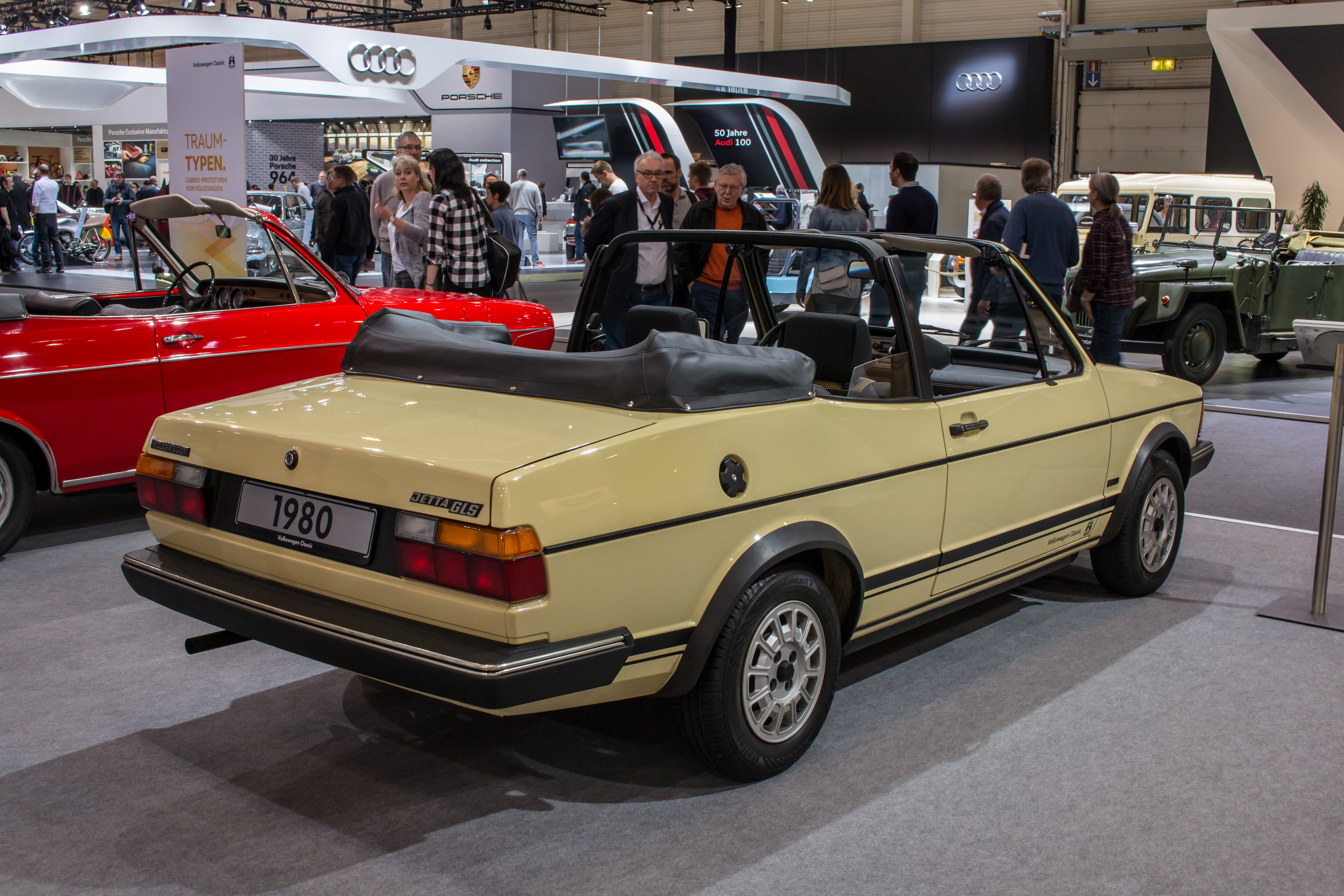
1980 Jetta convertible prototype

In August 1979, a sedan version of the Golf, called the Jetta, was introduced. Essentially a Golf Mk1 with a trunk grafted on, this three-box sedan body style was offered in two- and four-door versions, and was targeted at more conservative buyers. In North America, the Jetta was a sales success, but sales numbers in Europe lagged behind expectations.

In 1980, Karmann produced a prototype of a convertible Jetta based on the 2-door body. Sales of the Jetta sedan did not justify putting the convertible into production.

=== Golf Cabriolet ===
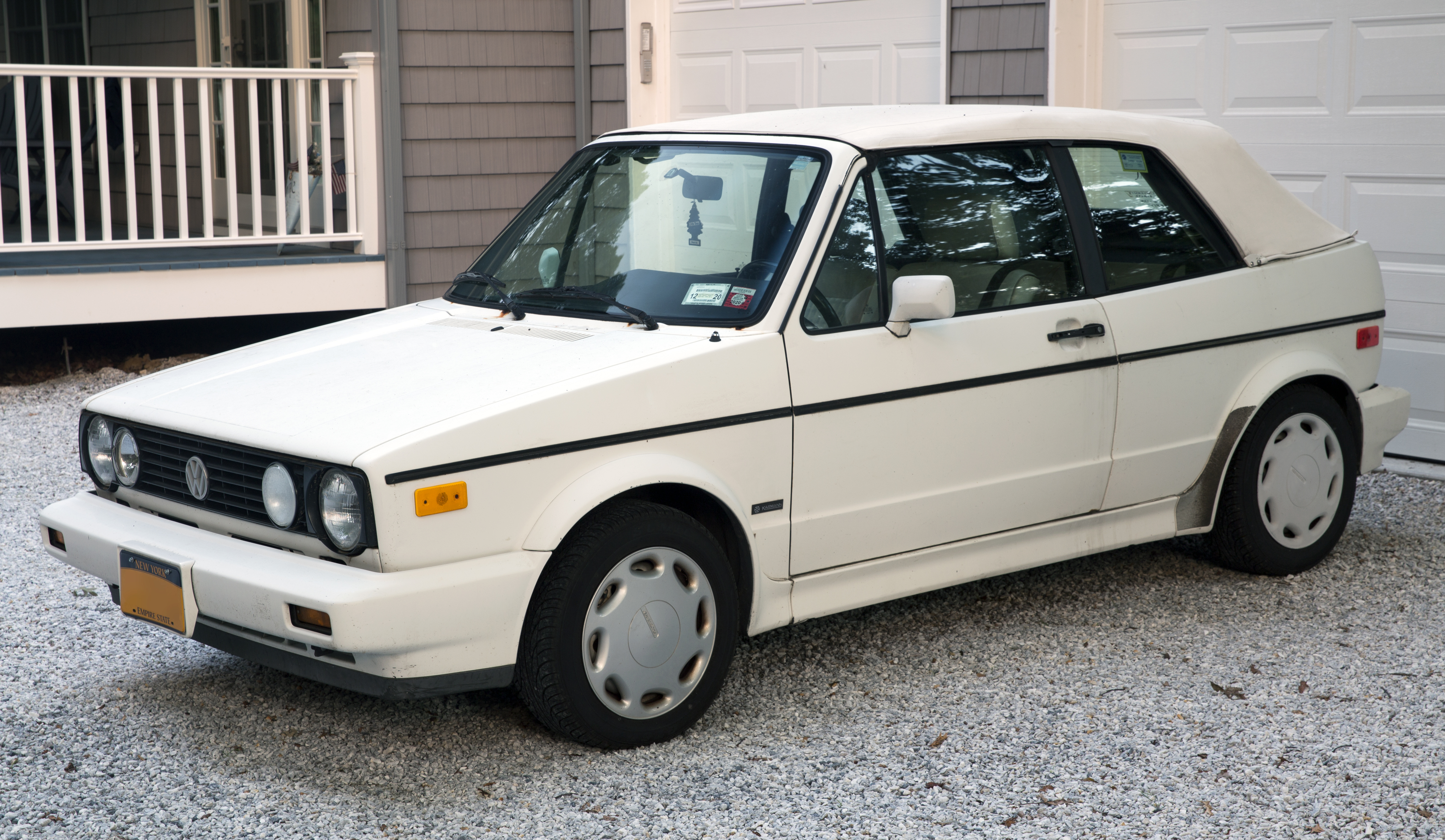
VW Golf I Cabriolet (1992 US model, front view)

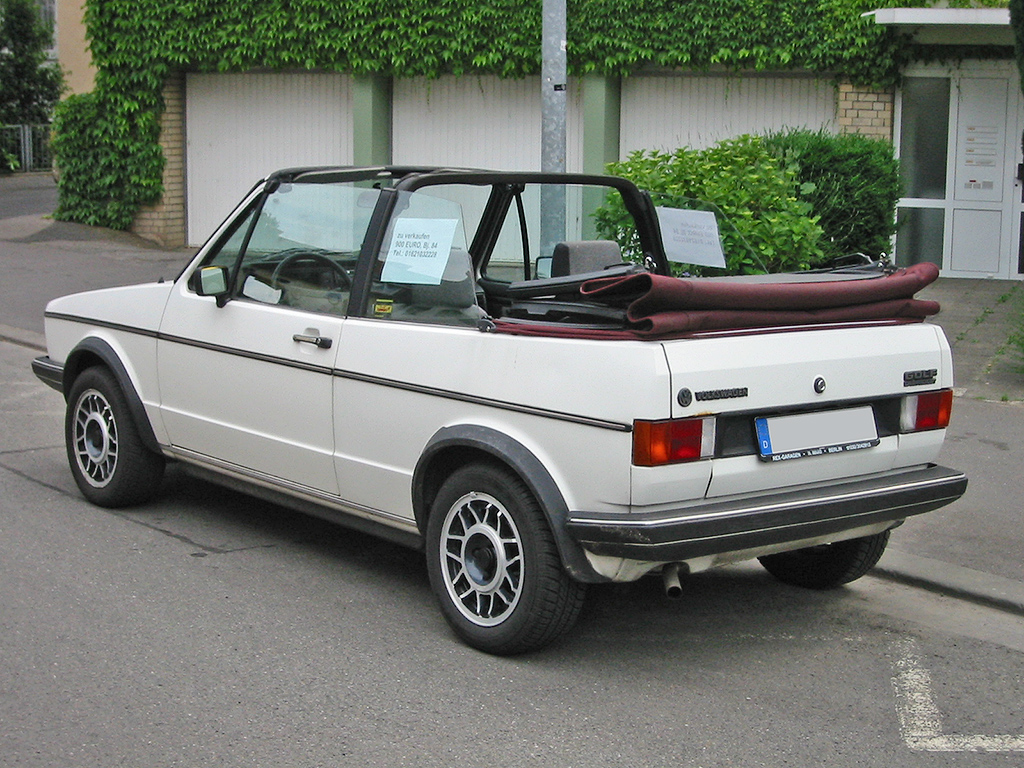
VW Golf I Cabriolet (rear view)

A convertible version of the Golf was presented to Volkswagen's management by coachbuilder Wilhelm Karmann GmbH as early as 1976. This early prototype lacked the roll-over bar of the later version, and had a flat body line in the rear, where the soft top folded down below the sill level.

Introduced in 1979, the production version of the convertible Golf was designated Type 155. It was known as the Golf Cabriolet in Europe and as Rabbit Convertible in the United States and Canada until the 1984 model year. As the Rabbit was replaced by the Golf II in the US and Canada, the Mark 1 Cabriolet was renamed the Volkswagen Cabriolet (without either the Golf or Rabbit nameplate) from the 1985 model year onwards. Beginning in 1988, Canadian models were badged as Golf Cabriolet. The Golf I Cabriolet received a reinforced body, a transverse roll-over bar, and a high level of trim. From stamping to final assembly, the Mk1 Cabriolet was built entirely at the Karmann factory. Volkswagen supplied engines, suspension, and interior trim for Karmann to install. The tops, of vinyl or cloth, were heavily insulated, with a heated glass rear window. The top was raised and lowered manually until 1991, when an electric option was offered. Production continued until April 1993; the last cars were sold after the introduction of the MkIII Cabrio. In the US, these were sold as the Cabriolet Classic (some as 1994 models), while in Europe they were called Golf Cabriolet Classicline.

The body of the Cabriolet did not change through the entire production run except for a larger fuel tank. It kept the pre-1980 Golf style of rear lamp lenses. A full-size spare tire was fitted from 1979 to 1984; a space-saver spare tire was fitted from mid-year 1984 onward, coinciding with the installation of a larger fuel tank. All Cabriolets from 1988 onward left the factory fitted with a "Clipper" body kit that featured smooth body-coloured bumpers, wheel-arch extensions, and side skirts.

Prior to the 1984 model year, the highest standard specification in Europe for the Cabriolet was the GLI, which was essentially a GTI in all but name. It was only in late 1983, with the introduction of the 1984 models, that an officially badged GTI version of the Cabriolet finally became available in the UK (the GLI continued in mainland Europe).

==== Cabriolet special editions ====
Special editions of the Cabriolet included the Etienne Aigner, Carat, CC, Wolfsburg Edition, Quartett, Acapulco, Havanna, Toscana, White Edition, Fashionline, Classicline, Azur, Bel-Air, Genesis, Sportline, Boutique, Youngline, and Best Seller models.

=== Golf GTD ===
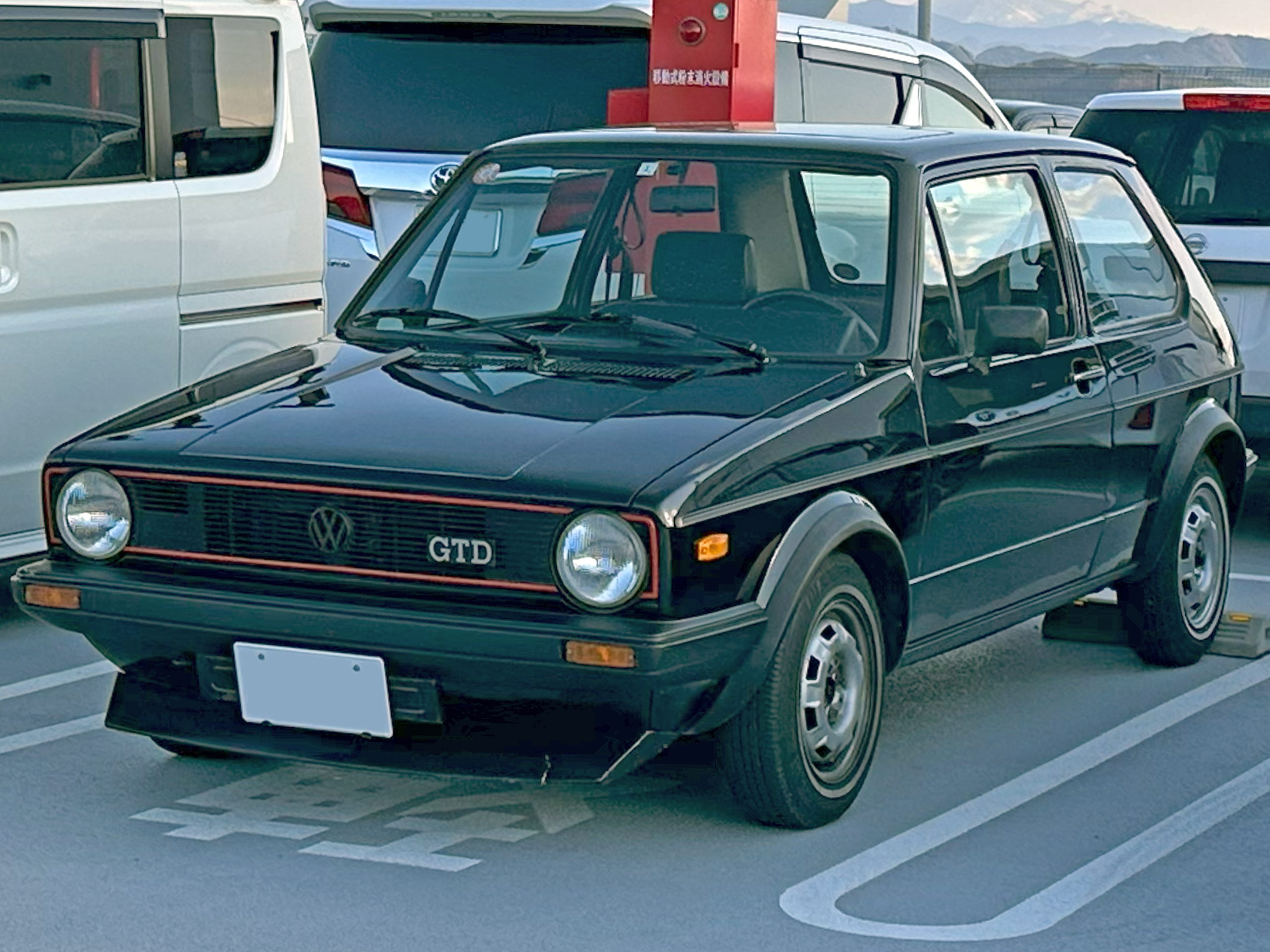
Volkswagen Golf GTD

Presented at the March 1982 Geneva Motor Show, the Golf GTD combined performance and economy. The car's appearance package and suspension were based on the Mk1 Golf GTI. The engine was a version of the 827 model diesel, with power boosted by a forced induction system. To increase the performance of the 1.6-litre naturally aspirated diesel, the GTD was equipped with a Garrett turbocharger with a maximum boost of 0.7 bar (10.2 psi), which raised power output to 51 kW (70 PS; 69 hp) and maximum torque to 130 N⋅m (96 lbf⋅ft) at 2600 rpm from the 40 kW (54 PS; 53 hp) and 98 N⋅m (72 lbf⋅ft) at 2300 rpm of the naturally aspirated engine. To make this power increase possible, more than 30 changes to the base engine were made, including increased oil circulation, a more efficient oil pump and reinforced or higher quality components such as head gasket and cylinder head. Due to the increased thermal load on the pistons, they were cooled from below by means of oil jets, and the engine was equipped with an oil-to-water heat exchanger on the flange of the oil filter element. The turbocharger was mounted between the engine and the firewall.

The turbo engine weighed about 8.5 kg (18.7 lb) more than the naturally aspirated diesel, and once all the accessories were factored in weight grew by 18 kg (39.7 lb). Average fuel consumption of less than 6 L/100 km (39.2 mpg_{‑US}) was possible, as long as the driver endeavored not to use the turbo.

=== Golf Van ===
The Mk1 Golf Van was marketed as a light-duty commercial vehicle, and consisted of a Mk1 body with the glass in the greenhouse's rear side openings replaced by steel panels. On the interior, the rear seats and cargo area cover were removed, and a small partition was installed behind the seats. Cargo capacity was 45 cu ft (1,300 L), and the payload rating was 9.5 long cwt (1,060 lb; 480 kg). The only engines offered in this model were the 1.1-litre EA111 gasoline engine and the 1.6-litre EA 827 diesel. Production is estimated to have started in 1980, and stopped in 1983 with the end of Mk1 assembly in Germany.

== Regional variations ==
=== Volkswagen Caribe (Mexico, 1977–1987) ===
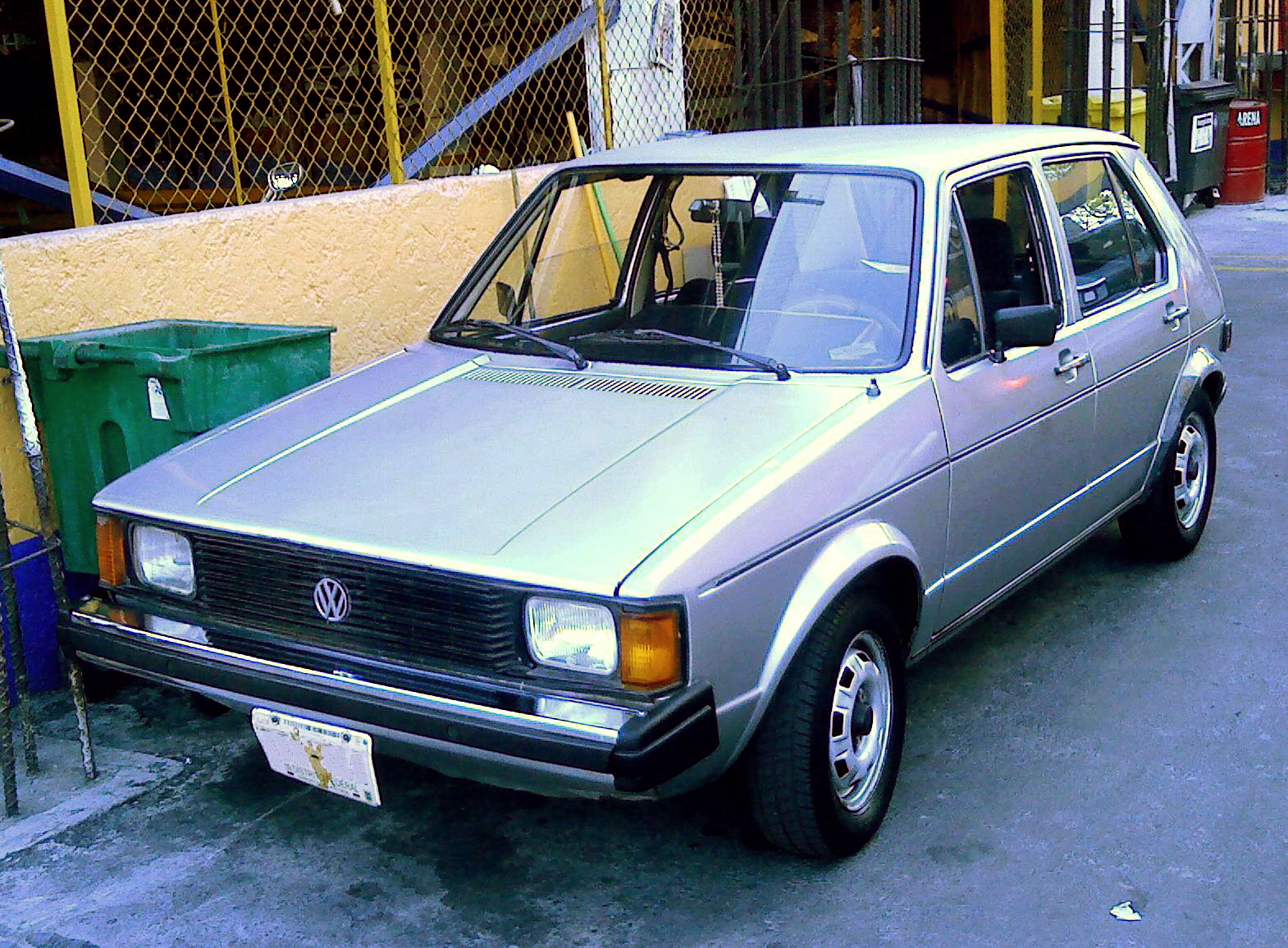
Mexican-spec 1982 Volkswagen Caribe L

In May 1977, the Mk1 Golf was launched in Mexico as the Volkswagen Caribe. It came standard with a four-speed manual transaxle and a 1.6-litre 66 hp (49 kW) carbureted engine. The car was an instant success. Initially, only the five-door body was offered, but the lineup expanded with the three-door body in 1978. Two initial trim levels were offered: "Base" and "L", with the "GL" trim level added in 1979.

The 1980 Caribe lineup remained essentially unchanged except for a slightly restyled front grille with squared type headlamps.

In 1981, an improved Caribe was offered to the Mexican market, with looks matching the recently facelifted North American-spec Mk1 Golf: the Volkswagen Rabbit. New features included revised bumpers, new taillights and a new front grille design. A diesel engine became an option that year.

In 1983, the Caribe range got an improved dashboard designed for the 1980 European Golf. Trim levels were also updated, with the previous "Base" entry-level rebadged as the "Caribe C", the "GL" level unchanged, and the mid-level "L" trim level being dropped.

In 1984, inspired by the worldwide success of the Mk1 Golf GTI, VW Mexico produced its own "hot" derivative: the Caribe GT. This version featured an 85 hp (63 kW) 1.8-litre engine with dual-carburetor fuel delivery system, rather than the electronic fuel injection of the GTIs.

Close to the end of the model production, VW Mexico offered three special Caribe versions in 1986 and 1987: "Caribe City", "Caribe Pro", and "Caribe Plus". The "Caribe City" was primarily based on the entry-level Caribe "C". It was offered only in Pearl Gray or Turquoise Blue paintwork and featured a distinctive "City" badge. The "Caribe Pro" was a somewhat downgraded version of the GTI-like Caribe GT. The "Pro" retained the sporty feel of the GT and was offered only with a 3-door body, with two paint choices: Tornado Red or Black. "PRO" label graphics were attached to the lower doors and the hatch. The "Caribe Plus" was the last special edition in the range. The "Plus" had GL level trim, and was offered only in Alpine White paintwork for the body colour and much of the trim, including the front grille and the bumpers (which were of the plastic-molded type sported by European Mk1 Golfs since 1980). The interior's upholstery and carpets were also Alpine White in this edition.

After 10 years of success, 1987 was the last production year for the Mexican Mk1 Golf-based Volkswagen Caribe series. The "Plus" special version could be considered the "Last Edition" Caribe, since it had a short production run before the discontinuation of the model lineup in March 1987, when the whole Caribe range was dropped in favor of the production and introduction in Mexico of the Golf MkII.

=== Volkswagen Rabbit/Golf (US/Canada) ===
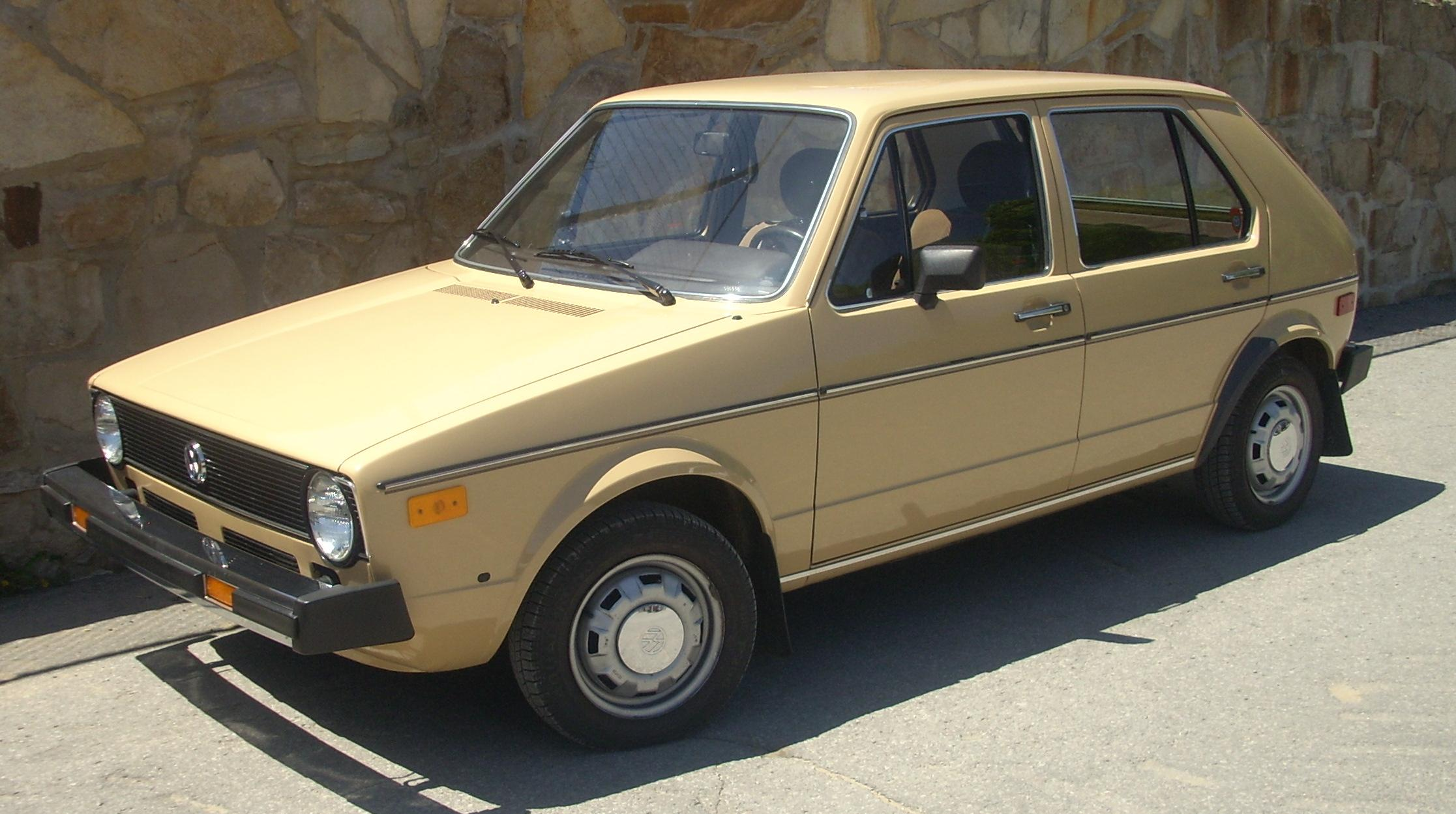
Volkswagen Rabbit (1976–1978)

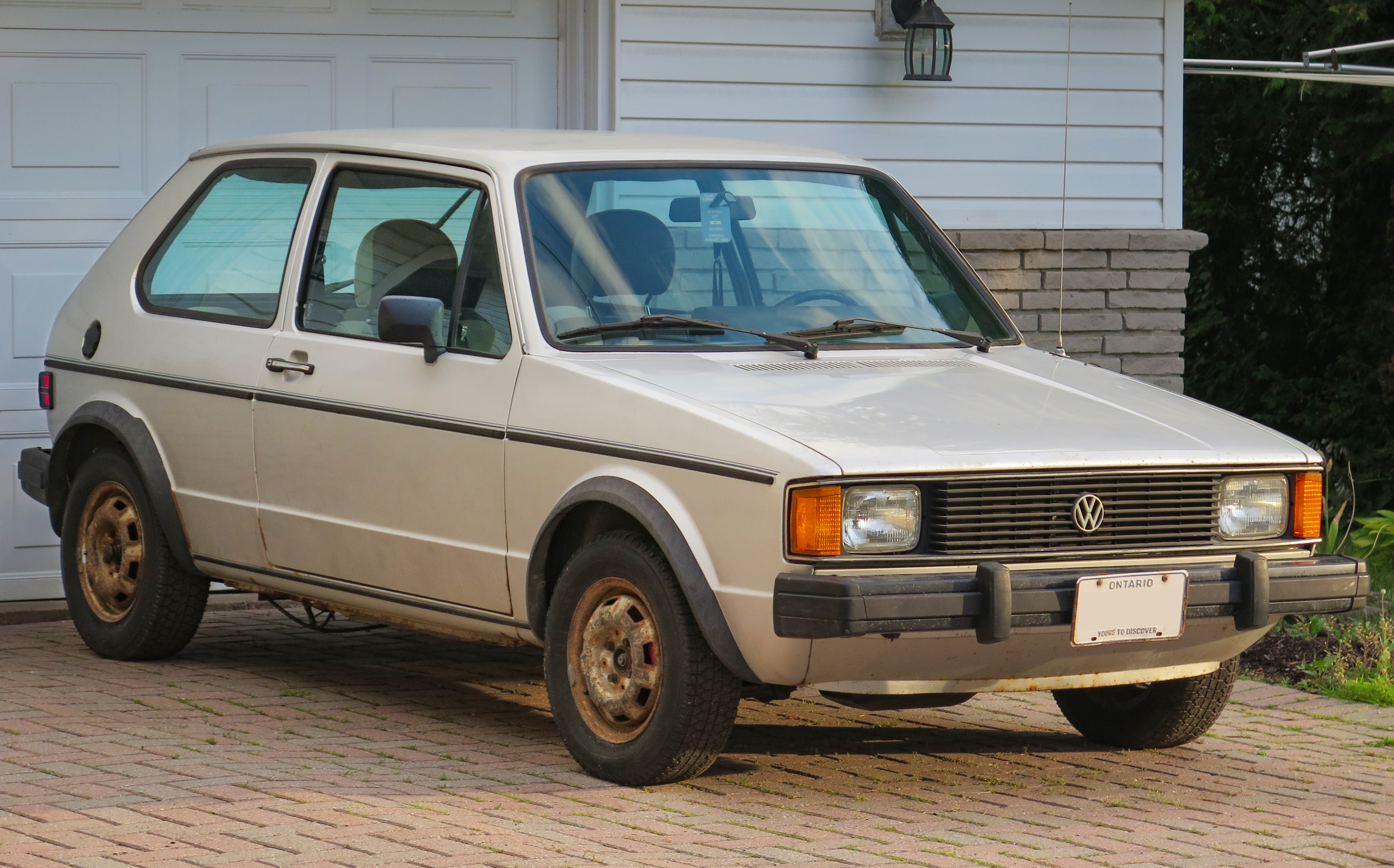
Volkswagen Rabbit (facelifted)

The Golf Mk1 was first introduced to the United States and Canada in December 1974 as the Volkswagen Rabbit. These early US Rabbits were produced in Germany and exported to North America. In July 1978, Volkswagen began building the Rabbit at its Westmoreland plant. Former Chevrolet engineer James McLernon was chosen to run the factory, which was built to lower the cost of the Rabbit in North America by producing it locally. McLernon moved to "Americanize" the Golf/Rabbit (Volkswagen executive Werner Schmidt referred to the act as "Malibuing" the car) by softening the suspension and using cheaper materials for the interior. VW purists in America and company executives in Germany were displeased. For the 1983 model year, the Pennsylvania plant went back to using stiffer shocks and suspension with higher-quality interior trim.

Rabbit Diesels arrived in mid-1977, and were originally German-built. During 1980, production was shifted to the Pennsylvania plant, with the most obvious change being a switch from round to square headlamps. The color schemes also changed; period testers noted a lower quality of materials being used, although fit and finish was as high as on German-made cars. The US-market 1.5-litre diesel had a claimed 48 hp (36 kW; 49 PS) at 5,000 rpm. This model was short-lived, with 1981 Rabbits receiving a facelift with wraparound turn signals and larger taillights, while the diesel engine was changed to a 52 hp (39 kW; 53 PS) 1588 cc unit. The plant also began producing the GTI for the North American market in the fall of 1982 for the 1983 model year. Rabbits were built in Pennsylvania until 1984. The first Volkswagen Caddy pick-up, based on the Mk1 Golf, was also created at the Pennsylvania plant.

Canada continued to import the German-made Rabbit until the 1981 model year, when Volkswagen Canada began to import the US-made version. The Rabbit Convertible (sold simply as the Volkswagen Cabriolet after 1984, when the Rabbit was replaced in the US and Canada by the second-generation Golf) was only ever assembled by Karmann in Germany; it retained the original, round headlamp front design after the US models were facelifted for 1981.

The original US-spec Rabbit saw use in a taxi fleet. The Yellow Cab Company of Lexington, Kentucky, bought eleven Rabbits in the late 1970s as part of an effort to save money on fuel, estimating an annual savings of $135,000 in gasoline costs. Two other companies considered using the Rabbit as the basis for a taxicab; the Checker Motors Corporation and the Wayne Corporation both built prototype taxis using Rabbits with much longer wheelbases than factory. Checker built one prototype and Wayne built three, but neither project went into production.

For 1981, the gasoline-powered Rabbit received a fuel injected 1,715 cc (104.7 cu in) engine, an iteration used only in North America, which offered 74 hp (55 kW). The carburetted versions were discontinued, although a carburetted version made its return on the mid-1982 "Special Value Rabbit".

The Volkswagen Rabbit GTI, the North American version of the high-performance Golf GTI, debuted in Canada in 1979 and the United States for 1983. Assembled from parts made in Mexico, Canada, Germany and the US in Volkswagen's Westmoreland assembly plant, it had the same Mk1 chassis, and the same A1 body type as the Mk1 Golf GTI that had been on sale in Europe since 1976, with a few exceptions. Key distinct features of the Rabbit GTI were its squared front end styling, and its alloy "snowflake" wheels. The interior came in red or blue felt and leatherette trim. The squared styling of the front end, particularly the wraparound direction indicator lights, gave it added safety and slight improvement in performance. Under the hood, the engine was a JH 1.8 litre four-cylinder gasoline engine that ran on unleaded fuel, In addition to being marginally larger than the regular engine it also had lightened pistons, bigger valves, a higher compression, and a free-flow exhaust as well as other minor improvements. The JH 1.8-litre would peak in stock condition at 90 hp (67 kW), delivered through a close-ratio five-speed manual transmission. In total, 30,000 of these 1.8-litre Rabbit GTIs were built in Pennsylvania.

When the Rabbit GTI first appeared in Canada, it featured the 71 hp 1.5-litre (1979) and 78 hp 1.6-litre (1980) K-Jetronic engine and wide ratio five-speed transmission. It was available in red, white, and black. These Canadian cars were German-built and were nearly identical in body shell and interior appearance to the 81 kW (110 PS; 109 hp) Golfs built in Europe. The entire drive-line and running gear was identical to the other Canadian versions. Five-MPH bumpers were fitted as well as anti-intrusion bars within the doors. The towing eye integral to the front of the European car was deleted as the crash-worthy bumper's shock absorbers had towing facilities as part of their design and the car had been crash-tested for Canada with the North American front apron. The car was attractive but drove no better or worse than a Rabbit of the same era.

For 1981, Canadian market Rabbits were sourced in Pennsylvania and the GTI went on hiatus. Only with the arrival of the American GTI was a faster Golf available in Canada, and it was still down 22 hp (16 kW) compared to the European-spec model. A small number of European specification GTIs made it to Canada under an agreement with the government that allowed foreign soldiers training at Canadian military facilities to bring their personal vehicles with them. As a result of this, VW made available (for many years) all unique European model parts required through VW of Canada. It was thus possible, although expensive, to build a "real" GTI. Some enthusiasts did so based on the reputation of the European car.

==== Technical data (North America) ====
VW Rabbit:	Base, C, L	Base, C, L (Note: Also as GTI in Canada for MY79 and MY80)	1.5 L	1.6 L	Base, C, L	C, L	L, GL	L, LS, GL, S	GTI, Conv/Cabrio	Cabriolet	C, L (Diesel)	C, L (Diesel) L, LS	LS, GL (Turbodiesel)
Model years:	1978–1980 (Note: Only in the "Bronze Rabbit" special edition for 1978, data from the owner's manual, printed 9/77)	1978–1979	1975	1976	1977	1980 [1980 (Note: Convertible; exclusively built by Karmann in Germany)]	1982–1984 (Note: Introduced during MY82 as the "Special Value Rabbit", regularly listed model as of MY83)	1981–1984 [1981–1983]	1983–1984 [1984–1989]	– [1990–1993]	1977–1980 (Note: From mid-77; US-built beginning with MY80)	1981–1984	1983 (Note: Sold for MY84 as well in Canada)
Engine:	EA827; water-cooled, gasoline inline-four										EA827; water-cooled, diesel inline-four		
Displacement:	1,457 cc (88.9 cu in)		1,471 cc (89.8 cu in)	1,588 cc (96.9 cu in)			1,715 cc (104.7 cu in)		1,781 cc (108.7 cu in)		1,471 cc (89.8 cu in)	1,588 cc (96.9 cu in)	
Bore × Stroke:	79.5 mm × 73.4 mm (3.1 in × 2.9 in)		76.5 mm × 80 mm (3.0 in × 3.1 in)	79.5 mm × 80 mm (3.1 in × 3.1 in)			79.5 mm × 86.4 mm (3.1 in × 3.4 in)		81 mm × 86.4 mm (3.2 in × 3.4 in)		76.5 mm × 80 mm (3.0 in × 3.1 in)	76.5 mm × 86.4 mm (3.0 in × 3.4 in)	
Compression ratio:	8.0		8.2						8.5	9.0	23.0		
Max. Power at rpm:	62 hp (46 kW) at 5,400	71.5 hp (53 kW) at 5,800	70 hp (52 kW) at 5,800	71 hp (53 kW) at 5,600	78 hp (58 kW) at 5,500	76 hp (57 kW) at 5,500	65 hp (48 kW) at 5,000	74 hp (55 kW) at 5,000 (Note: Canada: 76 hp (57 kW) at 5,000)	90 hp (67 kW) at 5,500	94 hp (70 kW) at 5,400	48 hp (36 kW) at 5,000	52 hp (39 kW) at 4,800	68 hp (51 kW) at 4,500
Max. Power at rpm:	–	70 hp (52 kW) at 5,800 (Note: Catalytic converter)	70 hp (52 kW) at 5,800	71 hp (53 kW) at 5,600	76 hp (57 kW) at 5,500	76 hp (57 kW) at 5,500	–	74 hp (55 kW) at 5,000	90 hp (67 kW) at 5,500	94 hp (70 kW) at 5,400	48 hp (36 kW) at 5,000	52 hp (39 kW) at 4,800	68 hp (51 kW) at 4,500
Max. Torque at rpm:	76.6 lb⋅ft (103.9 N⋅m) at 3,000	73.0 lb⋅ft (99.0 N⋅m) at 3,500	81.0 lb⋅ft (109.8 N⋅m) at 3,500	82.0 lb⋅ft (111.2 N⋅m) at 3,300	84.1 lb⋅ft (114.0 N⋅m) at 3,200		88.0 lb⋅ft (119.3 N⋅m) at 2,800	89.6 lb⋅ft (121.5 N⋅m) at 3,000 (Note: Canada: 91.3 lb⋅ft (123.8 N⋅m) at 3,000)	100.0 lb⋅ft (135.6 N⋅m) at 3,000		56.5 lb⋅ft (76.6 N⋅m) at 3,000	71.5 lb⋅ft (96.9 N⋅m) at 3,000	98.0 lb⋅ft (132.9 N⋅m) at 2,800
Max. Torque at rpm:	–	71.7 lb⋅ft (97.2 N⋅m) at 3,500	81.0 lb⋅ft (109.8 N⋅m) at 3,500	82.0 lb⋅ft (111.2 N⋅m) at 3,300	82.7 lb⋅ft (112.1 N⋅m) at 3,200		–	89.6 lb⋅ft (121.5 N⋅m) at 3,000	100.0 lb⋅ft (135.6 N⋅m) at 3,000		56.5 lb⋅ft (76.6 N⋅m) at 3,000	71.5 lb⋅ft (96.9 N⋅m) at 3,000	98.0 lb⋅ft (132.9 N⋅m) at 2,800
Induction:	Single-barrel carburetor	CIS (fuel injection)	Zenith two-barrel carburetor		CIS (fuel injection)		two-barrel carburetor	CIS (fuel injection)		Digijet (MPFI)	Distributor injection pump (TD: + turbocharger)		
Transmission (standard):	4-speed					4-speed [Conv: 5-speed]	4-speed	4-speed [Conv: 5-speed]	5-speed		4-speed		5-speed
Transmission (optional):	3-speed automatic	3-speed auto 5-speed manual (Note: 5-speed manual introduced late in MY79)	3-speed Automatic			3-speed auto 5-speed manual	–	3-speed auto 5-speed manual	[Conv: 3-speed auto]		5-speed		–
Top speed (italics for automatic transmission):	94 mph (152 km/h)	101 mph (163 km/h) (Note: 93 mph (150 km/h) for all models fitted with bias-ply tires); 98 mph (158 km/h)	99 mph (159 km/h); 97 mph (156 km/h)		104 mph (167 km/h); 102 mph (164 km/h)		93 mph (150 km/h)	99 mph (159 km/h); CDN: 158 km/h (98 mph) (Note: 1982 Canadian market convertible top speed was 155 km/h (96 mph), 150 km/h (93 mph) in automatic); 152 km/h (94 mph)	GTI: 108 mph (174 km/h)	[102 mph (164 km/h); 99 mph (159 km/h)]	87 mph (140 km/h) (Note: Theoretical top speed in 5th gear; "max. speed on the level is about 5% below this figure")	83 mph (134 km/h); CDN: 136 km/h (85 mph)	
Top speed (italics for automatic transmission):	–	100 mph (161 km/h); 97 mph (156 km/h)	99 mph (159 km/h); 97 mph (156 km/h)		103 mph (166 km/h); 101 mph (163 km/h)		–	99 mph (159 km/h); CDN: 158 km/h (98 mph); 152 km/h (94 mph)	GTI: 108 mph (174 km/h)	[102 mph (164 km/h); 99 mph (159 km/h)]	87 mph (140 km/h)	83 mph (134 km/h); CDN: 136 km/h (85 mph)	
Front suspension:	Independent with MacPherson struts and lower wishbones												
Rear suspension:	Semi-independent Torsion beam axle with trailing arms and coil-over dampers												
Brakes:	front disc brakes (Ø 239 mm); Rear drums												
Track front/rear:	1,390 / 1,358 mm (54.7 / 53.5 in)												
Wheelbase:	94.5 in (2,400 mm)												
Length:	153.3–157.3 in (3,894–3,995 mm) (Note: depending on year and whether bumper overriders are fitted)								157.3 in (3,995 mm) [159.3 in (4,046 mm) (Note: 153.1 inches from MY88)]	153.1 in (3,890 mm)	153.3–157.3 in (3,894–3,995 mm)		
US-built at Westmoreland Assembly California emissions 49-state only													

=== Volkswagen Citi Golf (South Africa, 1984–2009) ===
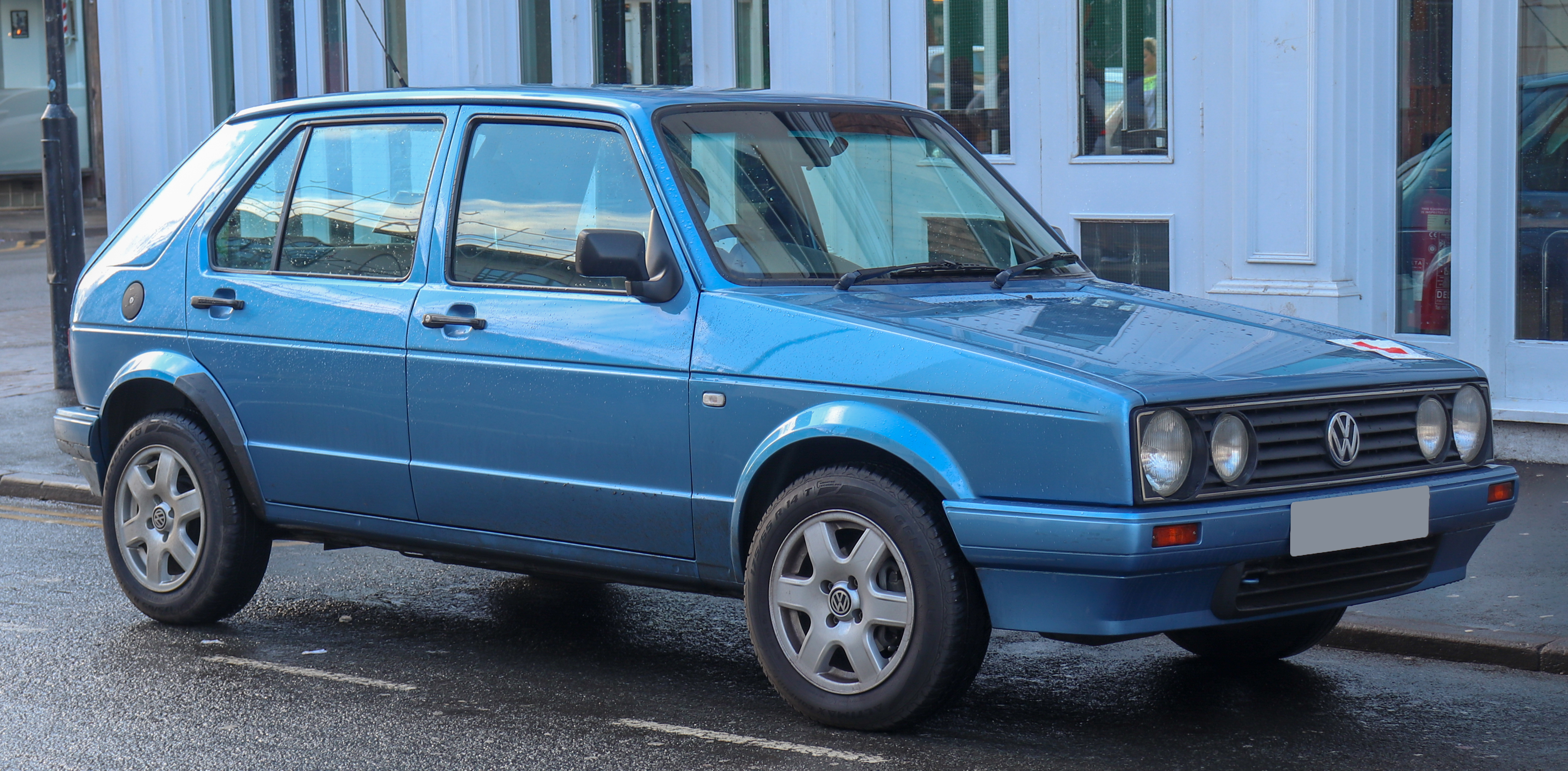
Volkswagen Citi Golf

From 1984 to 2009, Volkswagen of South Africa manufactured two variants of the Mk1 Golf: the five-door Citi Golf and the Volkswagen Caddy. Earlier, the original Golf Mk1 had been manufactured with petrol or diesel engines.

On 22 September 2006, to celebrate the continued success of the Mk1 based Citi Golf in South Africa, Volkswagen SA announced the limited edition Citi R, powered by a 90 kW (120 hp/123 PS) 1.8L fuel injected engine with a five-speed manual transmission as well as a GTI trademark red outlined front grille.

The 2007 VW South Africa Citi Golf range starts with a standard Citi Golf, in either 1.4 or 1.6 litre fuel injected models. Variations of the standard version with different options packages included the Citi Rhythm, Citi.com and others. The range topper is the CitiRox, also available in 1.4i and 1.6i, made as sportier versions of the standard Citi to replace the previous sports version, Velociti and Citi Life. The later Citi Golfs feature modern amenities such as a new dashboard adapted from a Škoda Fabia, and minor body "facelifts" such as revised tail-light clusters.

The 2009 VW South Africa Citi Golf range consisted of four new models:

- CitiRox 1.4i and 1.6i
- CitiSport 1.4i and 1.6i
- TenaCiti 1.4i
- CitiStorm 1.4i

Production of the Citi Golf ended on 2 November 2009, after 377,484 cars had been built. The final 1,000 vehicles manufactured were a special edition Citi Mk1 with a 1.6i engine. The colors available for the Citi Mk1 were "Shadow Blue" and "Black Magic Pearl".

== Experimental versions and specials ==
=== Volkswagen ===
Volkswagen used the Golf Mk1 as the basis of several experimental cars of their own. These included:

- ESVW II (1974), an experimental safety vehicle that included passive belts and airbags.

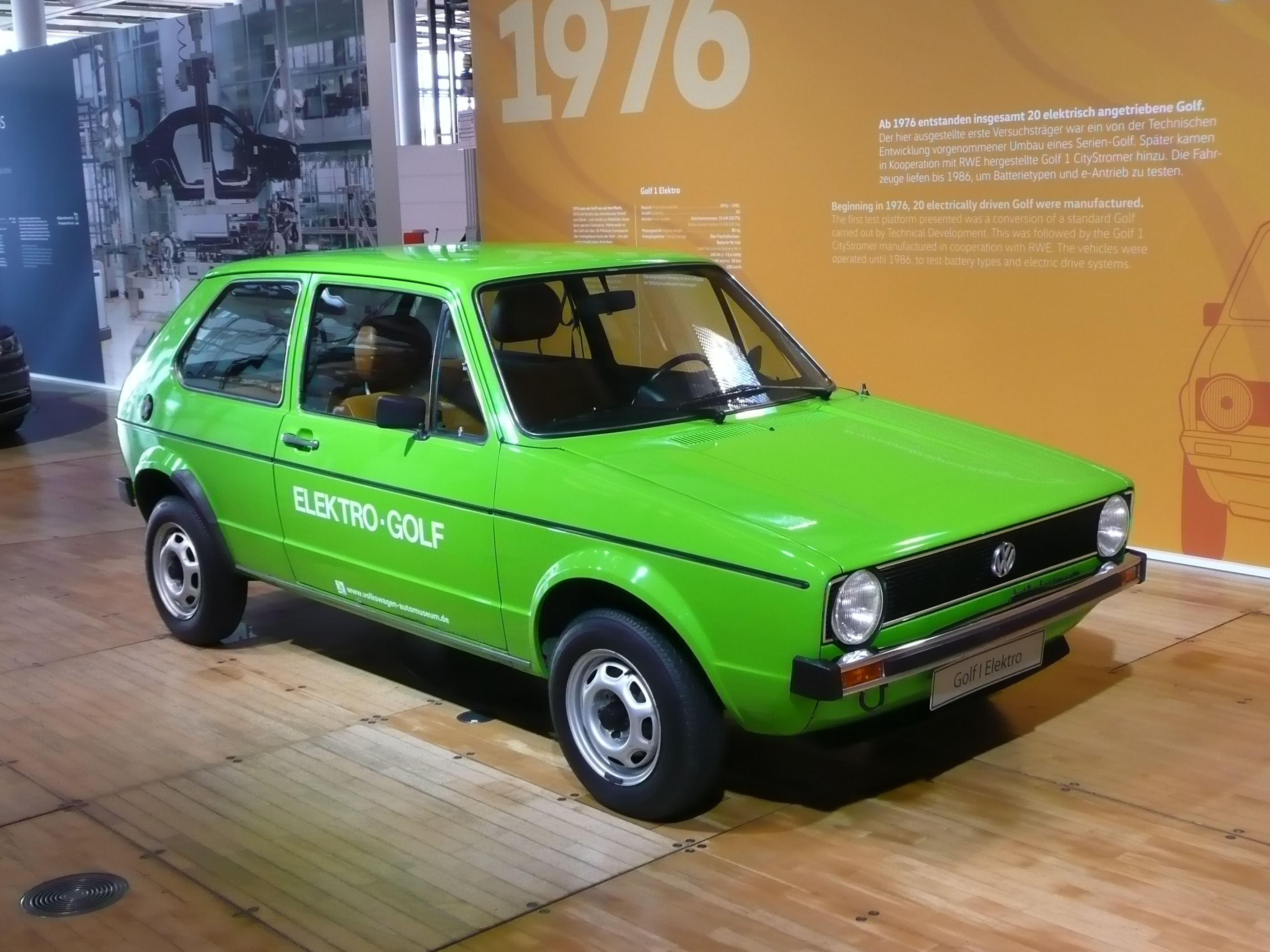
1976 Electro Golf 1

- Elektro Golf 1 (1976), an electrically powered prototype built by the factory. It was used for several years.
- RVW and IRVW (1979), two experiments in turbo-Diesel engines. The IRVW also implemented extensive changes to the chassis to improve crashworthiness. Both vehicles were tested by the EPA in the US from February 1977 to May 1978.
- Golf 1 CitySTROMer (1981), another electrically powered prototype and a follow-on to the Electro Golf and the first CitySTROMer. Using lead-acid batteries, this car had a range of 60 km (37.3 mi). Only 25 were made.
- Auto 2000 (1981), a streamlined, highly fuel efficient prototype that was designed to preview the cars of the year 2000 and used the platform of the Golf Mk I.
- EVW II, a prototype that adapted a 1982 Golf to an experimental two-shaft hybrid drive system that had both a petrol engine and a 5 kW electric motor.
- Seegolf (1983), a water-going Cabriolet and a special project of Ernst Fiala. With retractable pontoons, and a 175 PS (129 kW) engine driving the wheels and propeller, it achieved a speed of 22 kn (40.7 km/h) on the Wörthersee.

=== Artz/Nordstadt ===
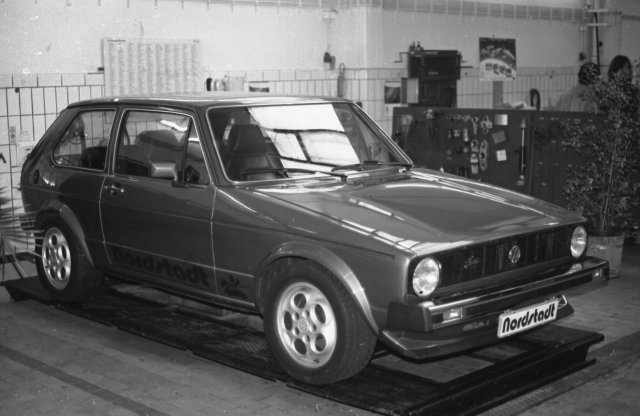
Nordstadt Golf

Günter Artz was director of the Hannover Volkswagen dealer Autohaus Nordstadt. Artz and Nordstadt produced several specials that were either based on or had the appearance of the Golf Mk1 or its derivative models.

- The Nordstadt Golf by Artz, also known as the Super Rabbit, was a Porsche 928 with a custom body in the style of the Mk1 Golf built in 1979. The body had to be widened by approximately 9 in (229 mm) and lengthened to fit the Porsche chassis. It produced 240 bhp (179 kW), could accelerate from 0–100 km/h (62 mph) in 7.6 seconds, 0–160 km/h (99 mph) in 18.9 seconds, and could reach a top speed of 230 km/h (143 mph). It was featured in the December 1979 issue of Road & Track. Six were built. A second-generation model was based on the 928S.
- The Artz Speedster was a Cabriolet whose roof-line had been lowered by 10 cm (3.9 in). Ten were produced.
- The Artz Cabrio and SuperCabrio were convertibles based on the two door Jetta. The donor car's B-pillar was retained in the Cabrio, while it was eliminated in the SuperCabrio.

=== Sbarro ===
Swiss fabricator Sbarro built several cars with the look of a Golf Mk1 but with greater performance. These included the following models:

- Golf Turbo (1983). This car had a 330 PS (243 kW) Porsche flat-six engine mounted amidships in a Golf Mk1 chassis. The engine was accessed by scissoring the rear sub-frame down, pushing the back of the car upwards.
- Sbarro 300S (1983). This Sbarro project mounted a Porsche 928 V8 driving the rear wheels in a Golf Mk1 body. Power was 310 PS (228 kW). Two were built.

=== Rinspeed ===
Rinspeed released their Golf Turbo 1 in 1979, and unveiled the Aliporta, a modified Golf Mk1 with gull-wing doors, in 1981.

=== ACM ===
In Italy, the ACM company built a vehicle called the Biagini Passo from 1990 to 1993. This crossover-like car started with a Mk1 Cabriolet body and mounted the engine, transmission, and Syncro four-wheel-drive system from the MkII Golf Country using a custom subframe. Approximately 65 were built.

== Motorsports ==
In the late 1970s, the Mk1 Golf GTI was campaigned in a variety of international rallying events, taking wins at Sweden (1978, 1982, 1983), Monte Carlo (1980), Great Britain (1983), and Portugal (1984).

In 1981, drivers Alfons Stock and Paul Schmuck won the German Rally Championship in a Golf GTI Mk1. The bright green Golf, sponsored by Rheila, was nicknamed the "Rheila Frosch" (Rheila Frog). In its final iteration, it was powered by a 147 kW (200 PS) Oettinger 16-valve engine.

== See also ==
- Volkswagen Group A platform
- Volkswagen Scirocco
- VDub

Preceded by Volkswagen Beetle	Volkswagen Golf Mk1; 1974–2009	Succeeded by Volkswagen Golf Mk2
