= Lucien Aigner =

Hungarian photojournalist (1901–1999)

- Born: September 14, 1901; Érsekújvár, Austria-Hungary
- Died: March 29, 1999 (aged 97); Waltham, Massachusetts, United States
- Occupation: Photojournalist
- Relatives: Etienne Aigner (brother)

Lucien Aigner (14 September 1901 – 29 March 1999) was a Hungarian photojournalist.

== Early life ==
Lucien Aigner was born on 14 September 1901 in Érsekújvár as Jenő Aigner (F:Adolf Aigner, M: Karola Stern), Austria-Hungary (now called Nové Zámky in Slovakia).

His first camera, a Brownie, was acquired when he was nine years old and he used it to photograph his family.

== Career ==
Initially earning a law degree, By 1926, Aigner was a reporter for the Hungarian newspaper Az Est, and soon became a photographer with them. During this time, Aigner started using a Leica camera.

From 1927 to 1939, Aigner was the chief of Az Est's Paris bureau. During this time he also freelanced for several other publications such as Vu, L'illustration, Picture Post, Berliner Illustrierte Zeitung and Münchner Illustrierte.

During his career Aigner's work was most often focused on political events that led up to the Second World War. He was the Paris correspondent of the London General Press at the Stresa Conference of 1935, where Aigner photographed Benito Mussolini, who was about to sneeze as the picture was taken. The photo made the cover of Newsweek in 1940, and established Aigner as a photojournalist. In 1939, he emigrated from France to the United States to escape Nazi persecution.

After his arrival he settled in New York, where Aigner continued his work as a freelancer, working for publications such as Christian Science Monitor and the New York Times. He spent time at Princeton University, taking photographs of Albert Einstein. The photos of Einstein are among Aigner's most famous, and were reportedly Einstein's favorite photos of himself. In 1948, Aigner retired from his work as a photojournalist.

Between 1948 and 1953 he worked as an announcer, scriptwriter, producer and director of American radio station Voice of America, moving to Massachusetts, where he opened a portrait studio.

== Achievements ==
In a 1999 article, published shortly after his death, The International Center of Photography described him, together with Henri Cartier-Bresson and Erich Salomon, as a "pioneer of the small camera" commending his work evoked “the atmosphere of everyday life in pre-war Europe."

Today, his works can be found in many collections including the Metropolitan Museum of Art, Museum of Modern Art, Smithsonian Institution, ICP New York City, Victoria & Albert, London and Bibliothèque Nationale, Paris.

== Personal life ==
Lucien's actual name was Ladislas. Throughout his life, he used the French version as it was easier to pronounce.

He gained United States citizenship in 1945.

Aigner was married twice and father to four children, having two daughters and two sons.

Aigner was the older brother of fashionable leather-goods manufacturer Etienne Aigner, who founded the luxury brand of the same name.

He died in Waltham, Massachusetts, United States, on 29 March 1999.
