= Volkswagen Auto 2000 =

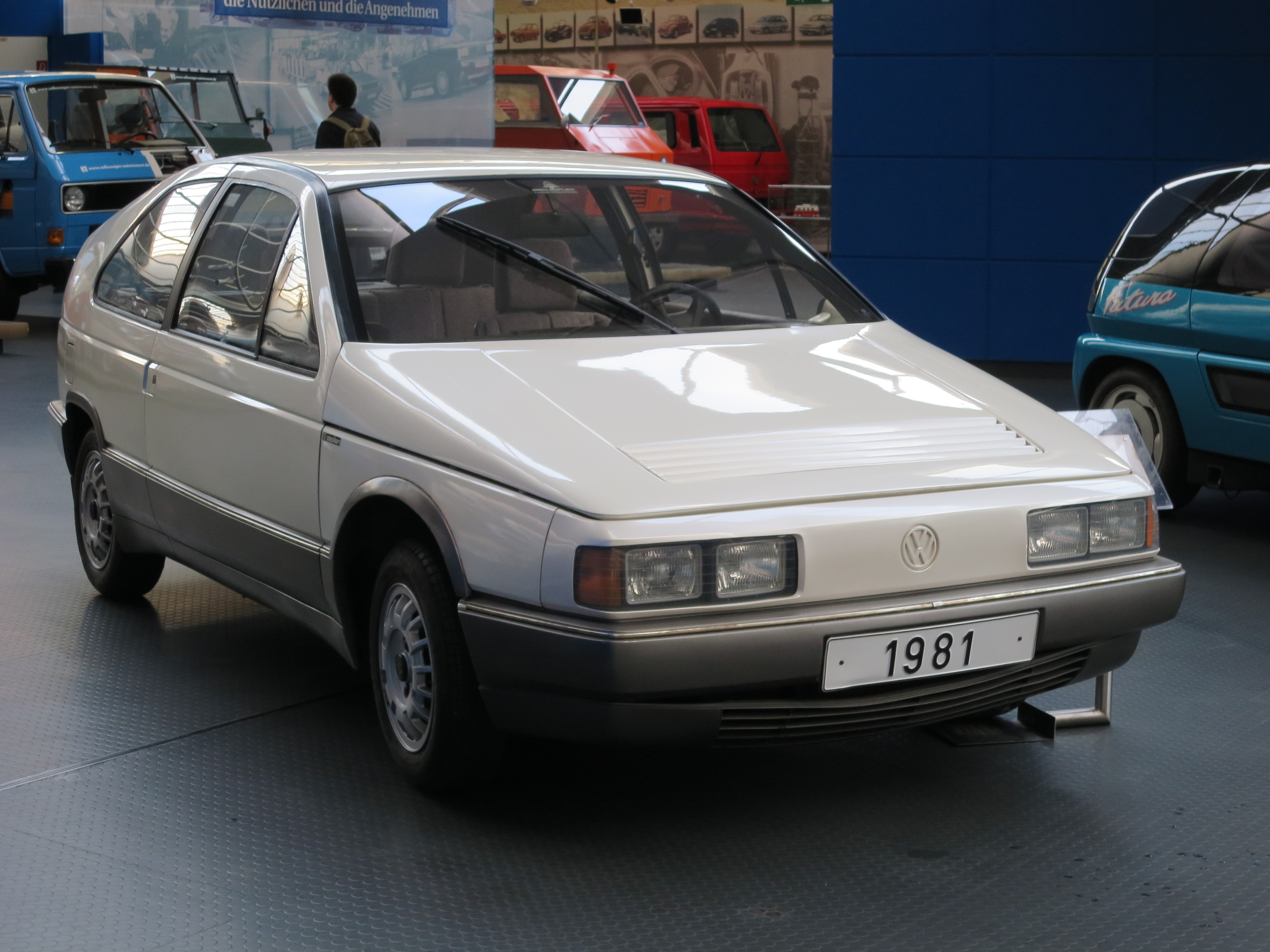

Overview
- Manufacturer: Volkswagen
- Production: 1981

Body and chassis
- Class: Concept car
- Body style: 3-door hatchback
- Related: Volkswagen Golf

Dimensions
- Length: 4,010 mm (158 in)
- Width: 1,670 mm (66 in)
- Height: 1,350 mm (53 in)
- Curb weight: 780 kg (1,720 lb)

The Volkswagen Auto 2000 is a concept car first shown by German car company Volkswagen in 1981. It was part of a German government-sponsored program to develop cars for the year 2000. Volkswagen's prototype was joined by efforts from Audi, Mercedes-Benz, and the University Working Group HAG (Hochschularbeitsgemeinschaft). As with the other Auto 2000 concepts, Volkswagen's car focused on fuel economy through the use of efficient engines and streamlining, and many of its features were to end up in series production.

== Auto 2000 ==
The Auto 2000 project was begun in January 1978 by the West German Federal Ministry for Research and Technology. They put forth 110 million Deutsche Mark for a program to develop the "car for the year 2000," with strict limitations on fuel consumption and weight. The four resulting projects were all presented at the 1981 Frankfurt Auto Show. BMW and Porsche were also initially part of the Auto 2000 project, but they did not reach the second stage (concept car).

== Design ==
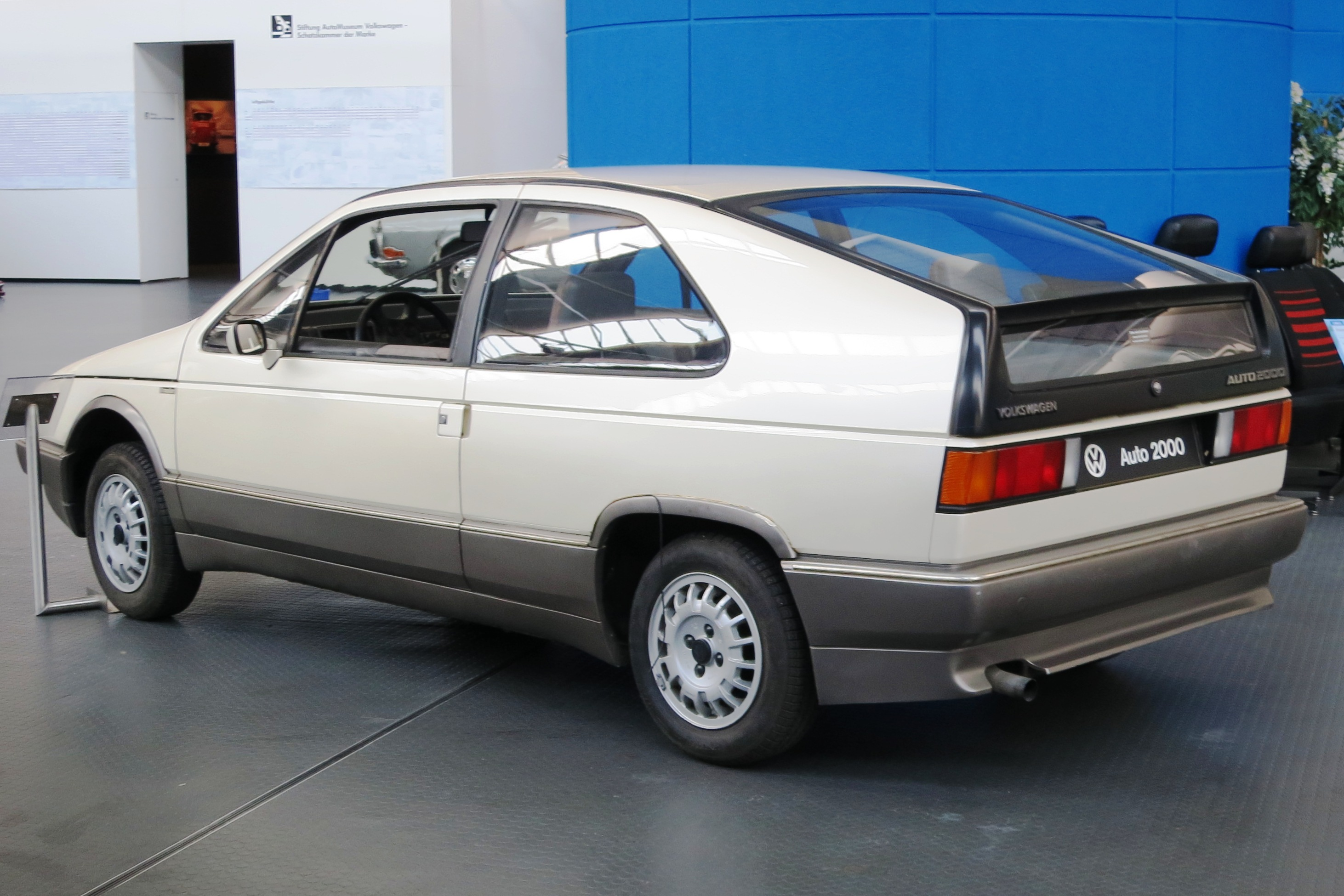
Rear view

The three-door hatchback used the chassis of the Volkswagen Golf Mk1 and was of a particular design, with a tall kammback rear end and a front without a traditional grille. Wind resistance was Cd=0.25. Smaller details such as the integrated drip rails (which also hid a welding seam) quickly made their way onto the Golf Mk2. Volkswagen had considered using the Auto 2000's front design on the new Golf, but in the end they decided on a more conventional front for what has long been their most important product. The Auto 2000 front end instead wound up on the Passat B3 in 1988. To save weight, the car used a number of parts made from composite materials, including a plastic rear axle.

The car was fitted with a succession of different engines as it underwent continuous development for a period: the first engine was a 1.2-liter, three-cylinder turbodiesel with 53 PS (39 kW). A supercharged version of the same developed 60 PS (44 kW); both these engines were fitted with Volkswagen's 4+E manual transmission, a five-speed 'box with a very long fifth gear to maximize economy. A 75 PS (55 kW) 1.05-liter supercharged petrol four was also used, coupled to a four-speed automatic with a freewheel function. The Auto 2000 was one of the first to feature Volkswagen's Stop-Start technology, allowing the car to save a considerable amount of gasoline in city driving. A flywheel was used to help start the motor again quickly. This was another feature that was to find its way into production cars, first in some of Volkswagen's own "Formel E" models and later spreading into a large share of all cars sold in Europe.
