= Etienne Aigner =

Clothing and accessory designer (1904–2000)

Étienne Aigner
- Born: November 8, 1904; Érsekújvár, Austria-Hungary
- Died: November 5, 2000 (aged 95); New York City, New York, United States
- Occupations: Handbag and leather goods designer

Étienne Aigner (November 8, 1904 – November 5, 2000) was the founder of Etienne Aigner US and Etienne Aigner AG, two presently separate high fashion houses, based respectively in New York City and Munich, Germany. Both companies produce luxury goods including handbags, shoes, women's ready-to-wear, wallets, and leather accessories.

== Biography ==
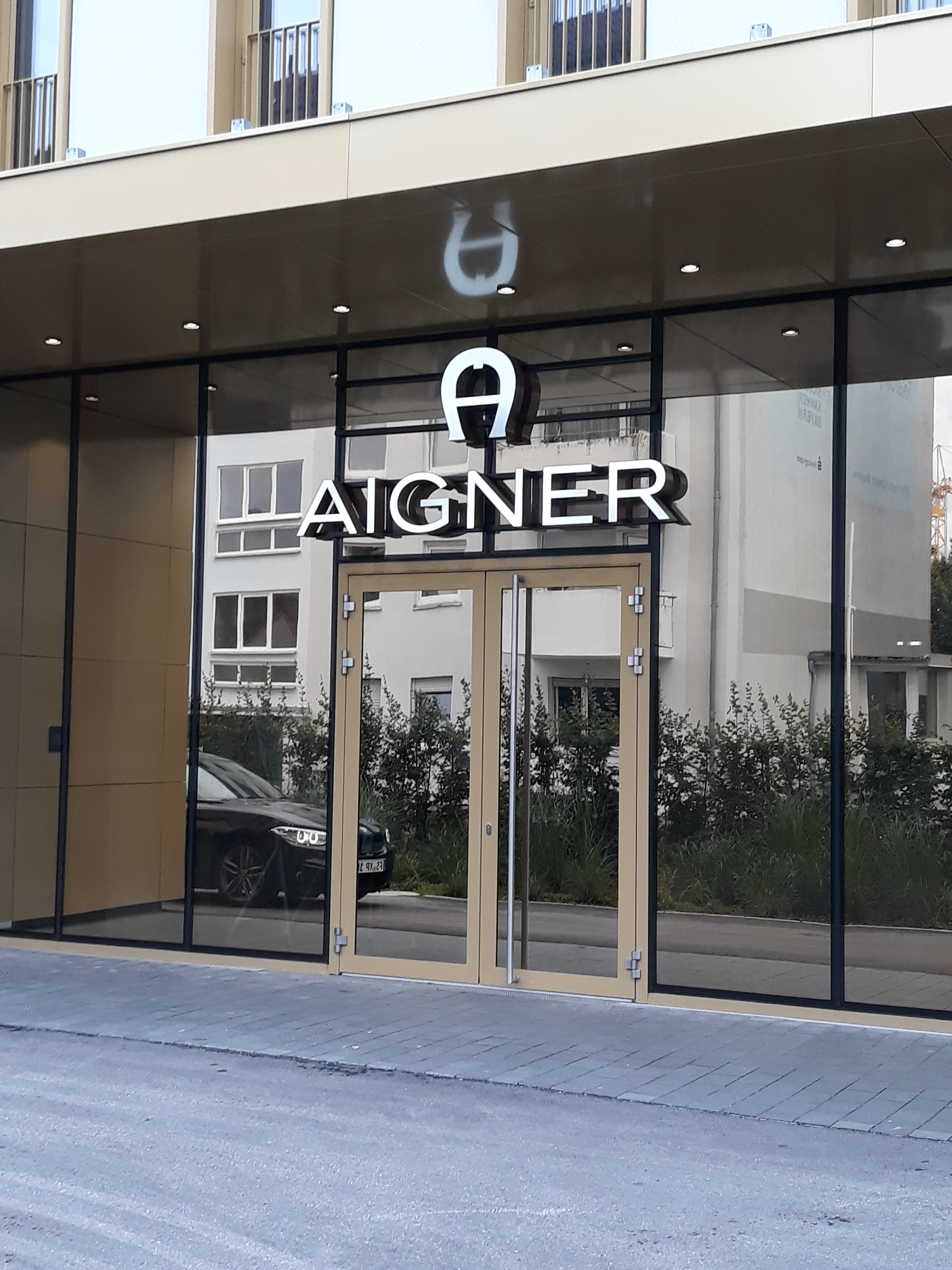
Headquarters of Etienne Aigner AG in Obersendling, Munich

Étienne (István) Aigner was born in Érsekújvár, Kingdom of Hungary, in 1904 (now Nové Zámky, Slovakia). Aigner was at first a bookbinder; in the 1930s he, together with his brother Lucien, who worked as a photo journalist, moved to Paris where he, at first, continued this profession.

During the Second World War, Aigner was an active participant in the French Resistance.

Shortly after the Second World War, he began creating custom-made high-end leather goods for a number of haute couture (high fashion) boutiques in Paris. Aigner established himself designing handbags and belts for the European fashion elite, attracting the attention of high end fashion brands, such as Dior, who ended up buying and using several designs of his

In 1950, after successful apprenticeships with designers Christian Dior and Cristóbal Balenciaga, Aigner moved from Paris to New York City with plans to launch his brand in the new burgeoning American market.

As was the case in Paris, Aigner's designs quickly began to attract the attention of high-end department stores across the country.

Etienne Aigner died in New York on November 5, 2000, at the age of 95, three days before his 96th birthday.

== Achievements ==
In 1950, he introduced his Antic Red leather open-pocket bag with angular processing (Antic Red being the brand's signature color). He also perfected the Aigner logo after his monogram, the "A" for Aigner shaped into a horseshoe.

In 1959, Aigner opened his first showroom in Manhattan, New York City.

In 1967, the brand was acquired by American dress manufacturer Jonathan Logan, and grew substantially.

During the 1980s Aigner stretched its product range by awarding licences for watches, jewellery and eyewear. In 1990 licences were awarded for the womenswear and menswear collection.

== Involvement in equestrian world ==
In 1974, Aigner inaugurated the "Royal Ascot in Munich": the 1974 Etienne Aigner Renntag (Race Day).

== Patents ==
Etienne Aigner took out design patents to protect his products, including:

- Etienne Aigner Buckle Patent: US Patent D218,007.
- Etienne Aigner Shoe Ornament Patent: US Patent D211,847.
- Etienne Aigner Handbag Closure Clasp Patent: US Patent D211,310.
- Etienne Aigner Handbag Closure Clasp Patent: US Patent D214,156.
- Etienne Aigner Chain variable element Patent: US Patent D214,156.
