= Real space =

Real space can mean:

- In physics, space in the real world, as opposed to some mathematical space or fictional space (such as hyperspace).
  - Three-dimensional Euclidean space
  - Position space
- In mathematics, a space which is not a complex space or a momentum space. These include:
  - Real coordinate space
  - Real manifold
  - Real vector space
  - Real affine space

Real spaces can also mean:

- Real Spaces, a book by David Summers.
