= Real Spaces =

2003 book by David Summers

Real Spaces: World Art History and the Rise of Western Modernism
- Author: Summers, David
- Language: English
- Subject: Art History
- Publisher: Phaidon
- Publication date: 2003
- Publication place: United States
- Media type: Hardcover
- ISBN: 0-7148-4244-3
- OCLC: 52056487
- Dewey Decimal: 701.18 21
- LC Class: N5303 .S88 2003

Real Spaces: World Art History and the Rise of Western Modernism is a non-fiction book by art historian David Summers, who aims to reconcile Western art history to artistic cultural production around the world from all time periods.

In the book, Summers creates his own art history methodology to explore spatial attributes of art and architecture and their connection to social functions throughout time. He disregards traditional formal and iconographical art historical models, aiming to explore cultural traditions from around the world within the chapters.

== Synopsis and chapter breakdown ==
=== Introduction ===
Summers divides the world into "Real Space", the space we share with other people and objects, and "Virtual Space", the space that exists within two dimensions which people "seem to see." He explains, "Real space is the space we find ourselves sharing with other people and things; virtual space is space represented on a surface, space we 'seem to see.' In fact, space can only be represented visually as virtual, but at the same time we always encounter a virtual space in a real space."

=== Facture ===
Facture is understood as an indication that an object has been made. Summers considers concepts of form, such as seriality, diachronicity, etc. Some are given new definitions, others are adjusted in relation to the existing literature; others do not change meaning at all. Summers relates and interconnects the concepts together in relationship to artworks such as Benvenuto Cellini's Salt Cellar of Francis I, of 1539–1543 to other artworks like Late Neolithic Arrowheads. The conceptual themes, such as fracture, become critical tools throughout the book.

=== Places ===
Places is based on that "places, as real social spaces, provide the possibility for the actual statement of relations of difference". The chapter discusses the concepts of difference (emphasizing its spatial qualities), centers and diasporas, shrines precincts, boundaries, paths, alignments and orientations, and the idea of a periphery and division of land outside the sanctum. For example, a Navajo hogan.

=== The Appropriation of the Centre ===
The Appropriation of the Centre gathers Egyptian, Akkadian, Roman, Khmer, Chinese, and French examples to articulate the change from cultures in which rulers appropriate the center. Rulers use centre as, "the point where the world is defined, with its values of collective generation, and the combination of notional 'cosmic' order and vital centrality provides the political order". For example, Shi Huangdi's capital of Xianyang.

=== Images ===
Images opens with a realignment of discussions on the origins of images, proposing that "images are fashioned in order to make present in social spaces what for some reason is not present". They are therefore substitutive, and it is important to study their "conditions of presentation" and "the relations of those conditions to our own spatiotemporality."

=== Planarity ===
Planarity follows the development of planar orders "as they shape and enable all kinds of routine, second-natural practices and activities". Concepts that follow from planarity include order (which is one of the basic relations between parts of an image, but is also "analogous to the order of the parts of something to which the image refers," measure and proportion, hierarchy, framing and division, symmetries, oppositions, profiles and frontal figures, harmony, ratio, grids, and maps.

=== Virtuality ===
Virtuality concerns the capacity to complete images by seeing three dimensions in two or by perceiving what is absent from what is given. Virtuality raises the problem of illusion, and effigies, narratives, and doubting or skepticism.

=== Conditions of Modernity ===
Conditions of Modernity examines "the conditions of presentation, trying to characterize the formation of Western modernity as a tradition of place and image-making traditions." Summers examines László Moholy-Nagy's Untitled (Looking Down from the Wireless Tower, Berlin) of 1932.

== Post-Formalism ==
Summers proposes that Western art history and world art history can be united by Post-Formalism, a new type of formalist artistic interpretation that privileges the form or shape of the art object. Throughout the text, Summers uses various definitions he has created or re-interpreted to better understand art objects based primarily on their form, which he believes will provide different cultural or social meanings of art.
