= Sibyl Moholy-Nagy =

German-American art historian

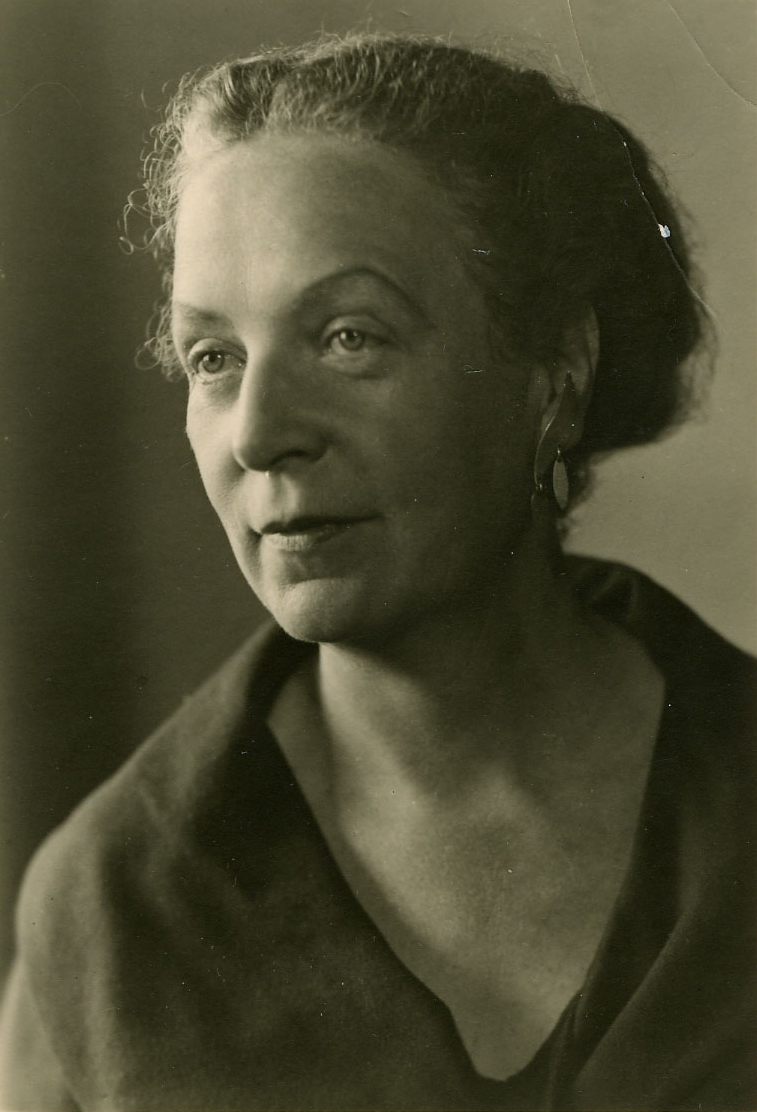
- Moholy-Nagy in 1967
- Born: Sibylle Pietzsch; October 29, 1903; Dresden, Germany
- Died: January 8, 1971 (aged 67); New York City, US
- Occupations: Professor, architectural historian and critic
- Employer: Pratt Institute (1951-1969)
- Spouses: Carl Dreyfuss (m. 1929, divorced) László Moholy-Nagy (m. 1935; died 1946)
- Children: 2

Sibyl Moholy-Nagy (born Dorothea Maria Pauline Alice Sybille Pietzsch; October 29, 1903 – January 8, 1971) was an architectural and art historian. She is known for shifting architectural attention away from iconic modernist buildings towards vernacular structures, urban history, and the lived experiences of building inhabitants. She was an outspoken critic of what she regarded as the excesses of postwar modernist architecture, arguing that it had lost connection to historical precedent, urban continuity, and human experience.

Moholy-Nagy was the first female full-time professor at the Pratt Institute in New York City. Originally a German citizen, she accompanied her second husband, the Hungarian Bauhaus artist László Moholy-Nagy, in his move to the United States. She was the author of several books on architectural history including Matrix of Man, Native Genius in Anonymous Architecture, and Moholy-Nagy: Experiment in Totality, a study of her late husband’s work.

== Biography ==
Sibylle Pietzsch was born in Dresden on October 29, 1903 to architect Martin Pietzsch (who was active in the Deutscher Werkbund movement) and Fanny (Clauss) Pietzsch. Her father also headed the Dresden Academy.

Moholy-Nagy was an intelligent and rebellious girl who did well in school but suffered from extreme anxiety. As the youngest daughter in a family of four, her parents believed in a privileged Bildung education, prioritizing a humanitarian focus on classics, an idea popular among Dresden bourgeois. Her deepest desire was to pursue a creative field, as a poet or literary author contributing to German culture. Her father, Martin Pietzsch, had an objection to females pursuing higher education, however, and she was not allowed to go to university.

After working at a variety of jobs (including clerical work for Leo Frobenius in 1923), she became an actress, performing on stage and in a couple of films. Sibylle would also anglicize her name to "Sibyl Peech" as a stage name. In 1929, she married the Frankfurt intellectual and industrialist Carl Dreyfuss, a close friend of social philosopher Theodor Adorno, who was one of their witnesses. At the time, Dreyfuss would attempt to convince her that it would be enough to have a small career in the performing arts occasionally playing theatre roles in Frankfurt, while simultaneously being a wife and mother. Sybil would however use her resources to her advantage an re-orient into a more writing-focused career, soon becoming an editor for the publishing house Rütten & Loening where she had access to many English and German manuscripts. Soon after in May 1931, she would also manage to publish her first piece of text under her name: a short article in an illustrated magazine.

In 1931, Moholy-Nagy would move to Berlin with the support of her career, now working as a scriptwriter and editor for Tobis Film Berlin. There she met the former Bauhaus professor, artist, and photographer László Moholy-Nagy (1895–1946) who was trying to get support for what would become his most famous film, A Lightplay black white gray. They became a couple by 1932, and had a daughter Hattula the next year, 1933.

Due to the rise of Nazism, László Moholy-Nagy worked for a year in Amsterdam in 1934, while Sibyl and Hattula remained in Berlin. The family reunited in London in 1935, where the couple formally married. A second daughter, Claudia, was born in 1936.

In 1937, the family emigrated to the United States, settling in Chicago. There, Moholy-Nagy assisted her husband in opening the New Bauhaus in October 1937, which was sponsored by the Association of Arts and Industries. After the New Bauhaus closed in June 1938, Moholy-Nagy helped her husband open his own school, the School of Design in Chicago in February 1939. In 1944 this school was reorganized and renamed the Institute of Design. Her husband died in November 1946 (ten years later, the Institute of Design became a department of the Illinois Institute of Technology, IIT Institute of Design). She finished copyediting her late husband's book Vision in Motion, which was published in 1947.

Following the death of her husband, Moholy-Nagy left the Institute and took teaching positions both at the University of Chicago College and at Bradley University in Peoria, Illinois. During this period, she lectured on topics in modern art as well as her late husband’s career specifically. It was also during this time that she published her book detailing his life’s work. Upon moving to New York in 1951, she would take a teaching position at the Pratt Institute of Design’s architecture program. At this juncture of her career, her scholarly focus turned to architecture. Her writings built on knowledge from her father, and from her friendships with Walter Gropius and Sigfried Giedion, who she had met through her husband.

In 1951, Moholy-Nagy was hired as associate professor of architecture history at Pratt Institute in New York City on the recommendation of Jose Luis Sert. She had fabricated her CV to claim she had studied at prestigious German universities. Despite this, she has been called “the pillar on which Pratt Institute was built” by Ron Shiffman, for her contributions to broadening and deepening the curriculum at the Pratt Institute, offering students up-to-date, visually attractive and engaging lectures, and exposing students to the architectural legacy of other continents. She positioned herself as a teacher for the next generation of architects. She taught courses on such subjects as urban history and design, becoming Pratt's first female full professor in 1960.

Moholy-Nagy resigned in 1969 over a conflict with other faculty about the future direction of the school, as she felt that the general climate at Pratt was such that it no longer provided an environment where a quality education was guaranteed.

then became a visiting professor at Columbia University in 1970.

She died in New York City on January 8, 1971.

After her death in 1971, fellow writer Reyner Banham eulogized her as "the most formidable of the group of lady-critics (Jane Jacobs, Ada Louise Huxtable, etc.) who kept the U.S. architectural establishment continually on the run during the 50s and 60s".

== Professional ambitions ==
Moholy-Nagy long harbored the ambition of becoming a professional writer, and following her intermittently successful acting career pursued roles alternately as an editor for the publishing house Rütten & Loening, as an assistant dramaturg at the Hessisches Landestheater Darmstadt, as a speechwriter, and as an independent freelance writer. These ambitions were largely put on hold as she poured herself into the support of her husband and their children following their immigration to the United States in 1937. However, following the establishment of the School of Design alongside her husband, she pursued recognition for her writing with renewed vigor.

She first found success with a semi-autobiographical essay submitted to Harvard that described her experience living in Germany before and after 1933. The success of this work, which provided a vivid, if partially fictitious, account of the role women play in maintaining family cohesion under the strain of impending war, sparked her continued success as a writer until her death. She went on to publish prolifically both fiction works and, in her later professional life, on the topic of architectural theory.

== Writings ==
Throughout the 1950s and 1960s, Moholy-Nagy had a parallel career as an architecture critic, maintaining professional relationships with such figures as Philip Johnson and Carlos Raul Villanueva. In 1945 she published a novel, Children's Children, under the pseudonym "S. D. Peech". In 1950 she wrote a biography of her husband, Moholy-Nagy: Experiment in Totality.

With a growing interest in architectural writing, Moholy-Nagy contributed a variety of criticisms and reviews on topical building projects that raised her standing as an architectural historian and critic. In 1952, the Architectural League of New York awarded her an Arnold Brunner research grant to study vernacular architecture, and she subsequently produced Native Genius in Anonymous Architecture (1957), one of the first books on vernacular design for modernist architects, calling attention to traditional buildings compatible with the natural environment. Native Genius in Anonymous Architecture was a precursor to the more recognized Architecture Without Architects: A Short Introduction to Non-Pedigreed Architecture by Bernard Rudofsky. Her writing was innovative in advancing an understanding of architecture that considered form, material, and climate as essential. Her critiques of modernism using a vernacular lens were rare for her time and deviated from conventional architectural historical scholarship.

In pursuit of a more regionalist and less abstract version of modern architecture, Moholy-Nagy turned her focus to contemporaries of modern architecture. She was an adamant supporter of Frank Lloyd Wright.

Wright, according to her, imbued his work with a transcendental message, referring to Christianity, ethnography, democracy and humanism. He was the most American among the masters, giving America an intrinsically American architecture, rooted in his empathy for the land. "Wright's claim to genius lies with his autochthonous design of the house," she wrote in her essay, "F.L.W. and the Ageing of Modern Architecture."

She was less supportive of architects moving towards a more abstract, industrial architecture, such as Le Corbusier, Ludwig Mies van der Rohe, and architects following the Bauhaus movement. Her critique of this form of modern architecture was grounded in her belief that modern architecture is—above all—a combination of art and architecture. In an excerpt from The Spiritual and Social Aspects of Constructivist Art, meant for Bauhaus students, Moholy-Nagy wrote:

Like them, constructive art is processual, forever open in all directions. It is a builder of man's ability to perceive, to react emotionally, and to reason logically.

One of her most important books, Matrix of Man: An Illustrated History of Urban Environment (1968), focused on the development of cities and the influence of landscape, regional climate, tradition, culture, and form. A major "objective in writing Matrix of Man [was to] study the origins of the city, in order to better grasp the concept of what a city could and should be." She also made numerous contributions to significant architecture magazines, such as Architectural Forum and Progressive Architecture. She was one of the first critics following MoMA’s Latin American Architecture Since 1945 exhibition to study postwar Latin American architecture in depth. Her professional relationship with Carlos Raul Villanueva and the opportunity to explore South America through the lens of vernacular architecture, a particular point of focus for her, led to considerable engagement with the continent. For example, in 1957 Moholy-Nagy commented on the university complex in Mexico City in an article titled "'Mexican Critique' for Progressive Architecture", questioning the success of the development in meeting the needs and culture of the university.

With that, Moholy-Nagy held the strong idea of the architect as a form-giver. She was critical of Jane Jacobs's 1961 book The Death and Life of Great American Cities, denouncing Jacobs's critique of architects harming the livability of the city. In turn, she argued the importance of architects and how “architecture ... has been and remains man's greatest tool to make this desire visible and viable."

In her career, she took strides to write about celebrated postwar and modernist architects, several of whom were friends of Moholy-Nagy and even her husband's former colleagues. In 1968, she published an essay in Art in America titled "Hitler's Revenge". She started this polemic with the words:

In 1933 Hitler shook the tree and America picked up the fruit of German genius. In the best of Satanic traditions some of this fruit was poisoned, although it looked at first sight as pure and wholesome as a newborn concept. The lethal harvest was functionalism, and the Johnnies who spread the appleseed were the Bauhaus masters Walter Gropius, Mies van der Rohe, and Marcel Breuer.

However, Moholy-Nagy’s work was not always received as she intended. In Matrix of Man, critics raised concerns about the lack of discussion regarding the practical application of Moholy-Nagy’s ideas in urban planning. It has been argued that what she intended was instead to discuss elements of the city in the realm of theoretical political arrangements rather than their physical design.

== Legacy ==
In the years following László Moholy-Nagy's death, Sibyl Moholy-Nagy actively engaged in preserving and promoting her husband's legacy. Not only did she undertake the responsibility of organizing exhibitions and delivering lectures on his art, but she also initiated contact with publishers to further disseminate his ideas. This commitment to sustaining Moholy-Nagy's influence went hand in hand with practical considerations, as she skillfully managed her and her children's financial well-being through a combination of Moholy-Nagy's life insurance, the sale of some of his paintings, and her income from teaching. Through her dual role as a custodian of his legacy and a provider for her family, Sibyl demonstrated a multifaceted dedication to preserving the impact of Moholy-Nagy's contributions to the world of art and design.

Yet over time, Sibyl's own contributions have far surpassed that of a custodian or a widow. Sibyl had a pronounced and widespread impact as an educator as a professor at the Pratt Institute from the 1950s through the late 1960s– especially as several of her students went on to become important figures in various fields of art and culture. These students include Jeffrey Cook, Peter Zumthor, David Easton, and Robert Wilson who all cite her as a major influence in their work. Sibyl Moholy-Nagy's broader teaching philosophy was rooted in the conviction that architecture is not a matter of style or taste, but of ethical and historical consciousness.

Sibyl Moholy-Nagy's achievements as a writer and critic make her an important figure in the history of women's involvement in art and architecture, yet she never identified herself as a feminist. She held more traditional understandings of gender inequality, with her daughter Hattula noting how Sibyl said of her success: "I've done all this as a woman." Despite actively rejecting feminist values as they were articulated in the 60s and 70s, Sibyl lived and worked in ways that embodied a form of structural feminism, asserting her own voice and skills in male-dominated spaces.

Regardless, her impact as a prominent female critic and art historian challenged the gender norms of the time and left a feminist legacy. Working during a time known for male architects like Frank Lloyd Wright, Le Corbusier, and Ludwig Mies van der Rohe, Sibyl nevertheless stood out, unafraid to criticize widely praised "starchitects". By becoming an advocate for the balance of perceived masculine and feminine influences in architecture, she embodied how women could overcome the gender-driven systemic barriers present in the post-war modernist culture of design and aesthetics.

Sibyl Moholy-Nagy embodied the central paradoxes of 20th century feminism: a woman who rejected the label yet lived its tensions daily. Navigating the roles of mother, wife, critic, and teacher, she carved out intellectual authority in a male-dominated field without aligning herself with the feminist movement of the time. Her life and work expose both the constraints imposed by gender and the strategies through which women asserted influence despite them, making Sibyl Moholy-Nagy not just a case study in exclusion, but a powerful figure of resistance and redefinition.

== Awards and honors ==
- 1953 – Arnold W. Brunner Grant, The Architectural League, New York City
- 1967 – John Guggenheim Fellowship, Guggenheim Foundation
- 1970 – American Institute "Critic of the Year"

== Selected publications ==
- Hilde Heynen (2019). Sibyl Moholy-Nagy: Architecture, Modernism and its Discontents . London, Bloomsbury. ISBN 1350094110, 9781350094116
- Children's Children (writing as S.D. Peech). New York: H. Bittner, 1945
- Moholy-Nagy: experiment in totality (2nd revised, original 1950 ed.). Cambridge, Mass.: MIT Press. 1969. ISBN 978-0262130530. OCLC 13372.
- Paul Klee: Pedagogical Sketchbook (Introduction and translations). New York: Praeger, 1953 (rev. 1968)
- Native Genius In Anonymous Architecture. New York: Horizon Press, 1957.
- Carlos Raul Villanueva and the Architecture of Venezuela. New York: Praeger, 1964.
- Matrix of Man: An Illustrated History of Urban Environment. Preager, 1968.
- The Architecture of Paul Rudolph. (Introduction). Praeger, 1970.
- Stratigakos, Despina (16 March 2015). "Hitler's Revenge". Places Journal (2015). doi:10.22269/150316. [A commentary on the proposed Grand Central Tower Project] Originally published in Art in America 56, no. 5 (September/October 1968): p. 42–43).
