= David Summers (art historian) =

American art historian

John David Summers (born 1941) is the Emeritus William R. Kenan Jr. Professor of Art Theory and Italian Renaissance Art at the University of Virginia. He holds a B.A. from Brown University (1963) and a Ph.D. from Yale University (1969). He taught at Bryn Mawr College and the University of Pittsburgh before accepting an appointment to the Center for Advanced Studies at the University of Virginia in 1981. In 1984, he was appointed William R. Kenan Jr. Professor of the History of Art and retired in 2015. He was elected to the American Academy of Arts and Sciences in 1996.

Summers is generally regarded as an expert on Renaissance art and a notable figure in the field of art historical research. Among his main contributions to art history is the publication Real Spaces: World Art History and the Rise of Western Modernism. This nearly seven-hundred-page book is the result of twenty years of studies and is an attempt to reformulate the disciplinary approach of art history.

Summers is the older brother of the writer Marilynne Robinson.

== Select list of Summers' publications ==
- Michelangelo and the Language of Art, Princeton: Princeton University Press 1981.
- The Judgment of Sense: Renaissance Naturalism and the Rise of Aesthetics, Cambridge: Cambridge University Press 1987.
- Real Spaces: World Art History and the Rise of Western Modernism, London: Phaidon 2003.
- Vision, Reflection, and Desire in Western Painting, Chapel Hill: University of North Carolina Press 2007.
