= László Moholy-Nagy =

Hungarian painter and photographer (1895-1946)

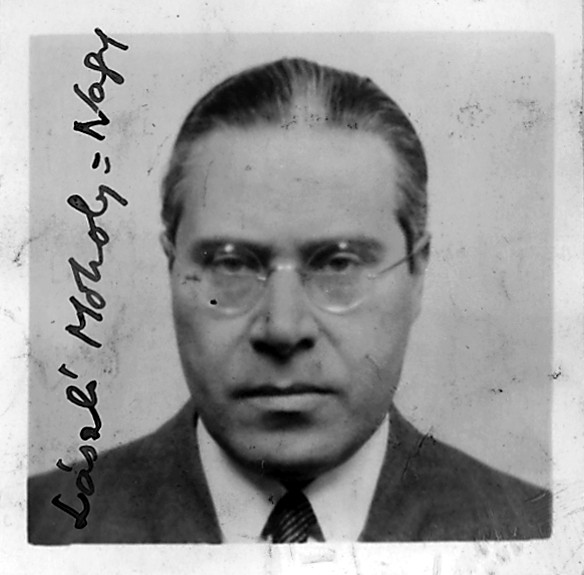
- Declaration of Intention for US citizenship (1938)
- Born: László Weisz; July 20, 1895; Bácsborsód, Austria-Hungary
- Died: November 24, 1946 (aged 51); Chicago, Illinois, US
- Resting place: Graceland Cemetery
- Education: University of Budapest
- Known for: Painting, photography, sculpture, film
- Notable work: Light Prop for an Electric Stage (1928–1930, also called Light-Space Modulator posthumously)
- Style: Constructivism
- Movement: Bauhaus
- Spouses: Lucia Schulz (m. 1921; div. 1929); Sibylle Pietzsch (m. 1932)

László Moholy-Nagy (/məˌhoʊliˈnɒdʒ/; Hungarian: [ˈlaːsloː ˈmoholiˌnɒɟ]; born László Weisz; July 20, 1895 – November 24, 1946) was a Hungarian painter and photographer as well as a professor in the Bauhaus school. He was highly influenced by constructivism and a strong advocate of the integration of technology and industry into the arts. The art critic Peter Schjeldahl called him "relentlessly experimental" because of his pioneering work in painting, drawing, photography, collage, sculpture, film, theater, and writing.

He also worked collaboratively with other artists, including his first wife Lucia Moholy, Walter Gropius, Marcel Breuer, and Herbert Bayer. His largest accomplishment may be the Institute of Design in Chicago, which survives today as part of the Illinois Institute of Technology, and art historian Elizabeth Siegel called "his overarching work of art". He also wrote books and articles advocating a utopian type of high modernism.

== Early life and education (1895–1922) ==
Moholy-Nagy was born László Weisz in Bácsborsód (Hungary) to a Jewish family. His mother was Karolin Stern, whose second cousin was the conductor Sir Georg Solti. László was the middle child of three surviving sons, but the family was soon abandoned by the father, Lipót Weisz.

The remainder of the family took protection and support from the maternal uncle, Gusztáv Nagy. The uncle was a lawyer, and sponsored the education of László and his younger brother, Ákos. In turn, Moholy-Nagy took the Magyar surname of his mentor. Later, he added "Moholy" to his surname, after the name of the town of Mohol (now part of Serbia) where he spent part of his boyhood in the family home nearby.

Moholy-Nagy attended a gymnasium school in the city of Szeged, which was the second-largest city in the country. Initially he wanted to become a writer or poet, and in 1911, some of his poems were published in local daily newspapers. Starting in 1913, he studied law at the University of Budapest.

In 1915, during World War I, he enlisted in the Austro-Hungarian army as an artillery officer. In service, he also made crayon sketches, watercolors, and writings to document his wartime experiences. He was injured on the Russian Front during the Kerensky offensive of July 1917, and convalesced in Budapest. While on leave and during convalescence, Moholy-Nagy became involved first with the journal Jelenkor ("The Present Age"), edited by Hevesy, and then with the "Activist" circle around Lajos Kassák's journal Ma ("Today").

After his discharge from the military in October 1918, Moholy-Nagy abandoned his law studies and attended the private art school of the Hungarian Fauve artist Róbert Berény. In 1918, he formally converted to the Hungarian Reformed Church; his godfather was his Roman Catholic university friend, the art critic Iván Hevesy. He was a supporter of the Hungarian Soviet Republic, declared early in 1919, though he assumed no official role in it.

After the defeat of the Communist regime in August, he withdrew to Szeged. An exhibition of his work was held there, before he left for Vienna around November 1919.

Moholy-Nagy moved to Berlin early in 1920, where he met photographer and writer Lucia Schulz; they married the next year.

In 1922, at a joint exhibition with fellow Hungarian Peter Laszlo Peri at Der Sturm, he met Walter Gropius. That summer, he vacationed on the Rhone with Lucia, who introduced him to making photograms on light-sensitized paper. He also began sketching ideas for what would become his most well-known sculpture, the Light-Space Modulator.

== Bauhaus years (1923–1928) ==
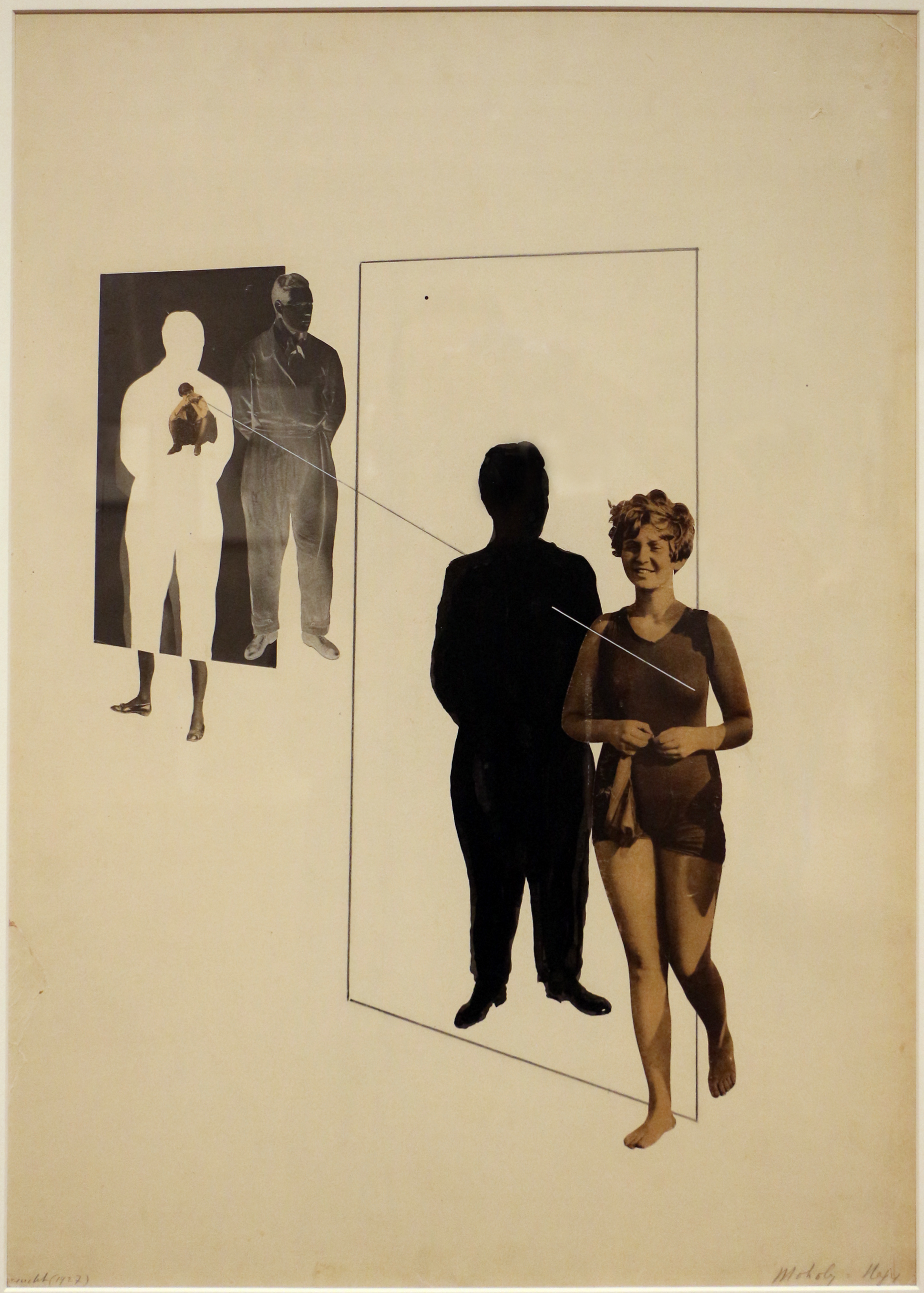
Jealousy (1927)

In 1923, Moholy-Nagy was invited by Walter Gropius to teach at the Bauhaus in Weimar, Germany. He took over Johannes Itten's role co-teaching the Bauhaus foundation course with Josef Albers, and also replaced Paul Klee as Head of the Metal Workshop. This effectively marked the end of the school's expressionistic leanings and moved it closer towards its original aims as a school of design and industrial integration. The Bauhaus became known for the versatility of its artists, and Moholy-Nagy was no exception. Throughout his career, he became proficient and innovative in the fields of photography, typography, sculpture, painting, printmaking, film-making, and industrial design.

One of his main focuses was photography; starting in 1922, he had been initially guided by the technical expertise of his first wife and collaborator Lucia Moholy. In his books Malerei, Photographie, Film (1925) and The New Vision, from Material to Architecture (1932), he coined the term Neues Sehen (New Vision) for his belief that the camera could create a whole new way of seeing the outside world that the human eye could not. This theory encapsulated his approach to his art and teaching.

Moholy-Nagy was the first interwar artist to suggest the use of scientific equipment such as the telescope, microscope, and radiography in the making of art. With Lucia, he experimented with the photogram; the process of exposing light-sensitive paper with objects laid upon it. His teaching practice covered a diverse range of media, including painting, sculpture, photography, photomontage, and metalworking.

== Depression era (1929–1937) ==
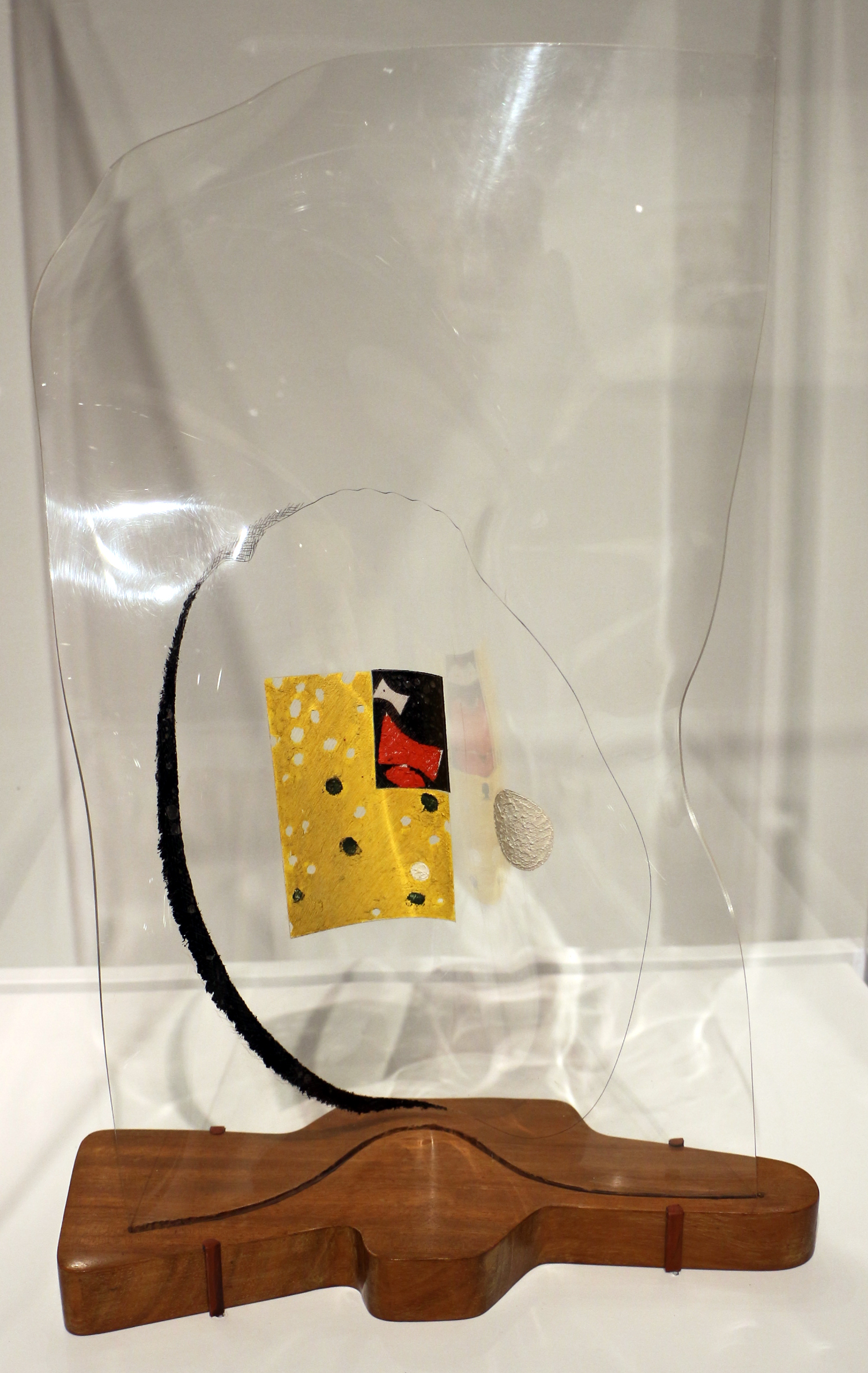
Space modulator with evidence (1942)

Moholy-Nagy left the Bauhaus in 1928 and established his own design studio in Berlin. Marianne Brandt took over his role as Head of the Metal Workshop. He separated from his first wife Lucia in 1929.

An iconic achievement was Moholy-Nagy's construction of the Lichtrequisit einer elektrischen Bühne (Light Prop for an Electric Stage) (1928–1930), a device with moving parts designed to have light projected through it to create shifting light reflections and shadows on nearby surfaces. It was made with the help of the Hungarian architect Istvan Seboek for the Deutscher Werkbund exhibition held in Paris during the summer of 1930; it was later dubbed the Light-Space Modulator and was seen as a pioneer achievement of kinetic sculpture using industrial materials like reflective metals and Plexiglas. Given his interest in the light patterns it produced more than its appearance when viewed directly, it might more accurately be seen as one of the earliest examples of Light art. This was a form that he continued to develop in the 1940s in the United States, in Space Modulator (1939–1945), Papmac (1943), and B-10 Space Modulator (1942).

Moholy-Nagy was photography editor of the Dutch avant-garde magazine International Revue i 10 from 1927 to 1929. He designed stage sets for successful and controversial operatic and theatrical productions, designed exhibitions and books, created ad campaigns, wrote articles, and made films. His studio employed artists and designers such as Istvan Seboek, György Kepes, and Andor Weininger.

In the summer of 1931 Moholy-Nagy travelled to Finland with his then girlfriend actress Ellen Frank (sister-in-law of Walter Gropius), as a guest of Finnish architect Alvar Aalto. During the trip, Moholy-Nagy visited the Holy Cross Church in Hattula, and in 1933 he would name his first daughter Hattula.

Also in 1931 he met actress and scriptwriter Sibylle Pietzsch. They married in 1932 and had two daughters, Hattula (born 1933), and Claudia (1936–1971). Sibyl collaborated with her husband to make Ein Lichtspiel: schwarz weiss grau ("A Lightplay: Black White Gray"), a now-classic film based on the Light-Space Modulator. She would also work with him on the films Gypsies and Berlin Still Life, and would remain with him for the rest of his life, later becoming an art and architectural historian.

After the Nazis came to power in Germany in 1933, as a foreign citizen, he was no longer allowed to work there. He worked in 1934 in the Netherlands (doing mostly commercial work) before moving with his family to London in 1935.

In England, Moholy-Nagy formed part of the circle of émigré artists and intellectuals who based themselves in Hampstead. Moholy-Nagy lived in the Isokon building with Walter Gropius for eight months and then settled in Golders Green. Gropius and Moholy-Nagy planned to establish an English version of the Bauhaus but could not secure backing, and then Moholy-Nagy was turned down for a teaching job at the Royal College of Art.

Moholy-Nagy earned a living in London by taking on various commercial design jobs, including work for Imperial Airways and a shop display for men's underwear. György Kepes worked with him on various commercial assignments.

He photographed contemporary architecture for the Architectural Review where the assistant editor was John Betjeman who commissioned Moholy-Nagy to make documentary photographs to illustrate his book An Oxford University Chest. He was commissioned to make the films Lobsters (1935) and New Architecture and the London Zoo (1936). He began to experiment with painting on transparent plastics, such as Perspex.

In 1936, he was commissioned by fellow Hungarian film producer Alexander Korda to design special effects for the now-classic film Things to Come, based on the novel by H. G. Wells. Working at Denham Studios, Moholy-Nagy created kinetic sculptures and abstract light effects, but they were mostly unused by the film's director. At the invitation of Leslie Martin, he gave a lecture to the architecture school of Hull School of Art.

In 1937 his artworks were included in the infamous "Degenerate art" exhibition held by Nazi Germany in Munich.

== Chicago years (1937–1946) ==
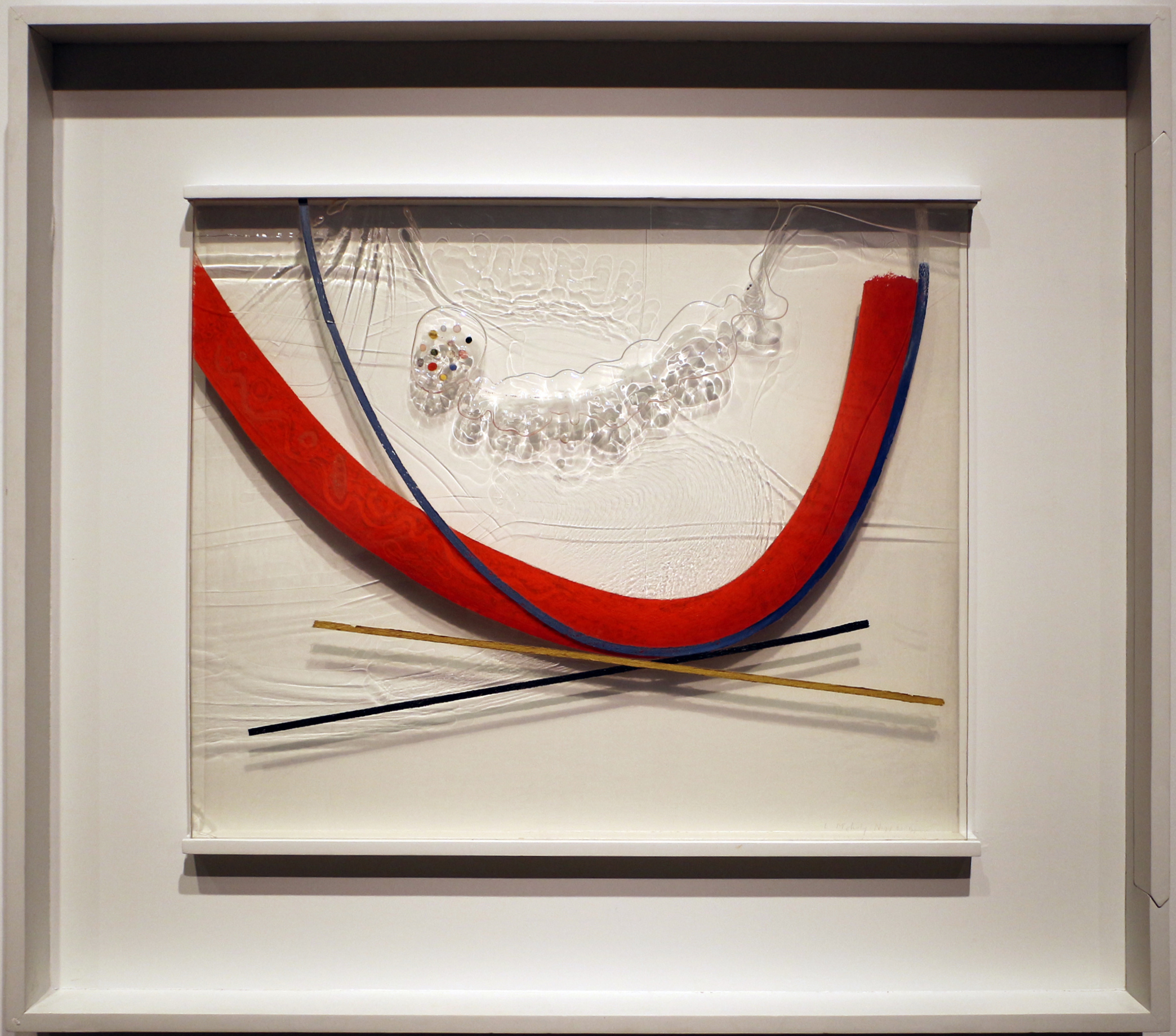
Papmac (1943)

In 1937, on the recommendation of Walter Gropius, and at the invitation of Walter Paepcke, the Chairman of the Container Corporation of America, Moholy-Nagy moved to Chicago to serve as the founding director of the New Bauhaus. The philosophy of the school was basically unchanged from that of the original, and its headquarters was the Prairie Avenue mansion that architect Richard Morris Hunt had designed for department store magnate Marshall Field.

By 1938, the New Bauhaus closed due to financial difficulties, but with Paepcke's continued support, Moholy-Nagy continued the academic program by reopening in February of 1939 as the School of Design in Chicago.

In 1940, the summer session of the School of Design was held at Mills College in Oakland, California. In 1942, he taught a summer course at the Women's Teachers College in Denton, Texas.

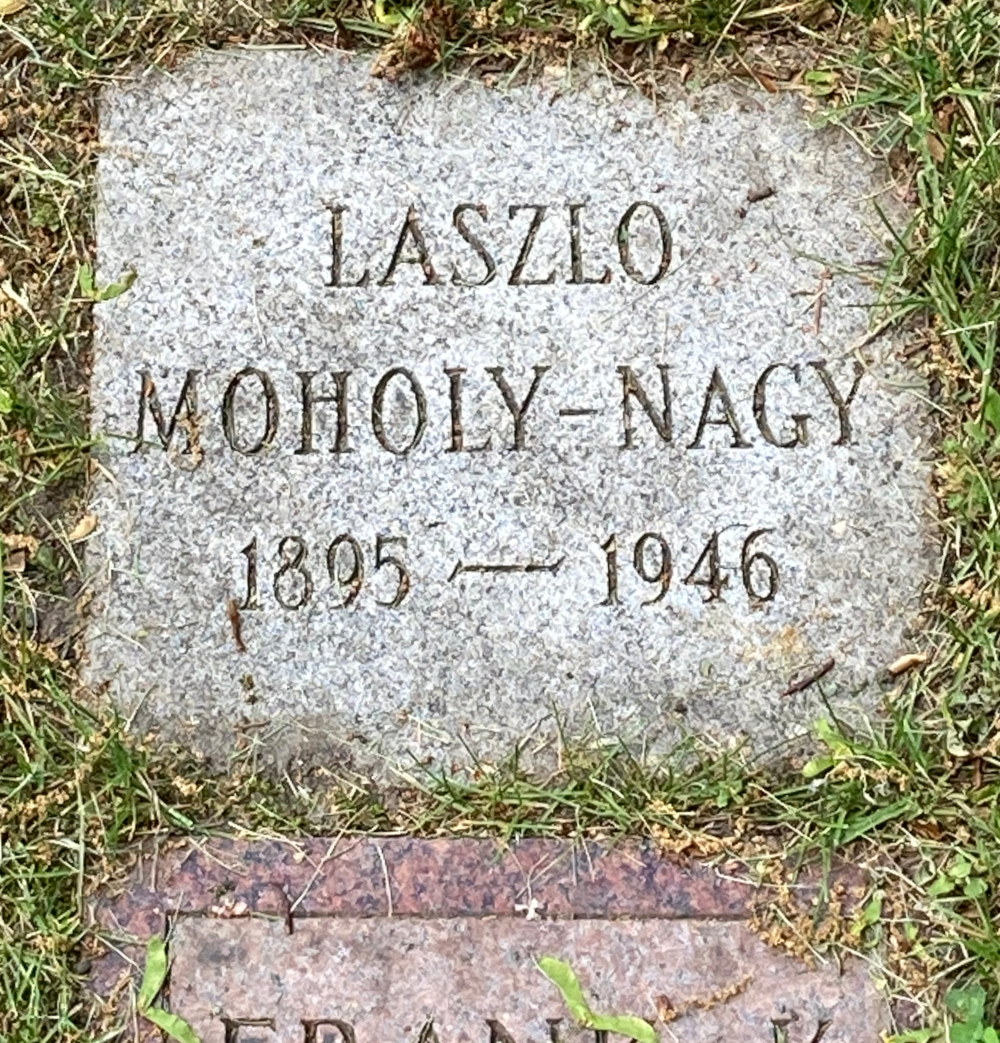
Moholy-Nagy's grave at Graceland Cemetery

By 1943, Moholy-Nagy began work on an account of his efforts to develop the curriculum of the School of Design. It would be posthumously published in his 1947 book Vision in Motion, in collaboration with his art historian wife Sibyl.

In 1944, the School of Design in Chicago became the Institute of Design, and by 1949 it would become a part of Illinois Institute of Technology, the first institution in the United States to offer a PhD in design.

In the 1930s after the New Bauhaus initially closed, Moholy-Nagy resumed doing commercial design work, which he continued to do for the rest of his life and he served as the Art Advisor for the mail-order house of Spiegel in Chicago. As an artist, Moholy-Nagy notably started making static and mobile sculptures in transparent plastic, often accented with chromed metal.

Moholy-Nagy was diagnosed with leukemia in 1945. He became a naturalized American citizen in April 1946. He continued to produce artworks in multiple media, to teach, and to attend conferences until he died of the disease in Chicago on November 24, 1946. He was buried at Graceland Cemetery.

=== Pedagogy and influence ===
Moholy-Nagy's teaching emphasized experimentation, interdisciplinary collaboration, and learning through making; his approach rejected rigid academic specialization in favor of integrating artistic, technological, and scientific methods. These principles influenced postwar American design education and helped shape the development of design as a distinct academic discipline through the New Bauhaus, then the School of Design, and finally the Institute of Design.

== Legacy ==
The software company Laszlo Systems (developers of the open source programming language OpenLaszlo) was named in part to honor Moholy-Nagy. Moholy-Nagy University of Art and Design in Budapest is named in his honor. In 1998 a Tribute Marker from the City of Chicago was installed to commemorate his work, which established the foundation for modern design education in the United States, particularly through the Institute of Design (a center for experimental and systems-oriented design).

In the autumn of 2003, the Moholy-Nagy Foundation, Inc. was established as a source of information about Moholy-Nagy's life and works. In 2016, the Solomon R. Guggenheim Museum in New York exhibited a retrospective of Moholy-Nagy's work that included painting, film, photography, and sculpture.

In 2019, a documentary film The New Bauhaus directed by Alysa Nahmias was released. The film centers on Moholy-Nagy's life and legacy in Chicago, featuring his daughter Hattula Moholy-Nagy, grandsons Andreas Hug and Daniel Hug, curator Hans-Ulrich Obrist, and artists Jan Tichy, Barbara Kasten, Barbara Crane, Kenneth Josephson, Debbie Millman, and Olafur Eliasson.

Moholy-Nagy was a partial inspiration for the character of László Tóth in Brady Corbet's film The Brutalist.

== Gallery ==
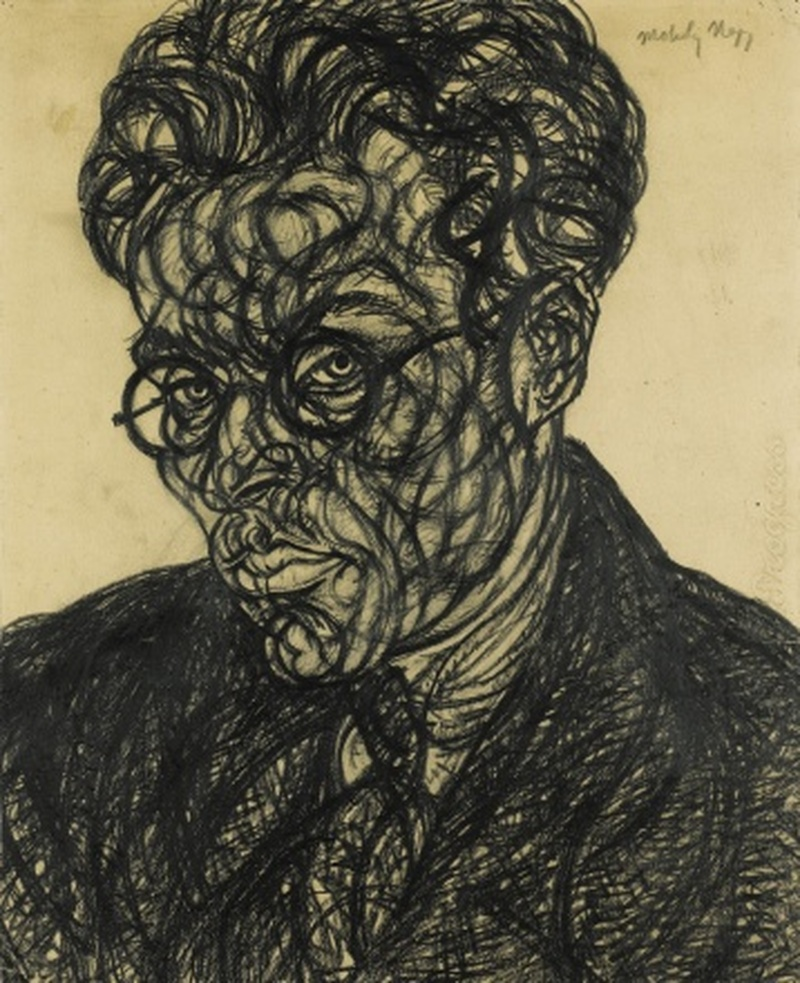
Self portrait (1918)

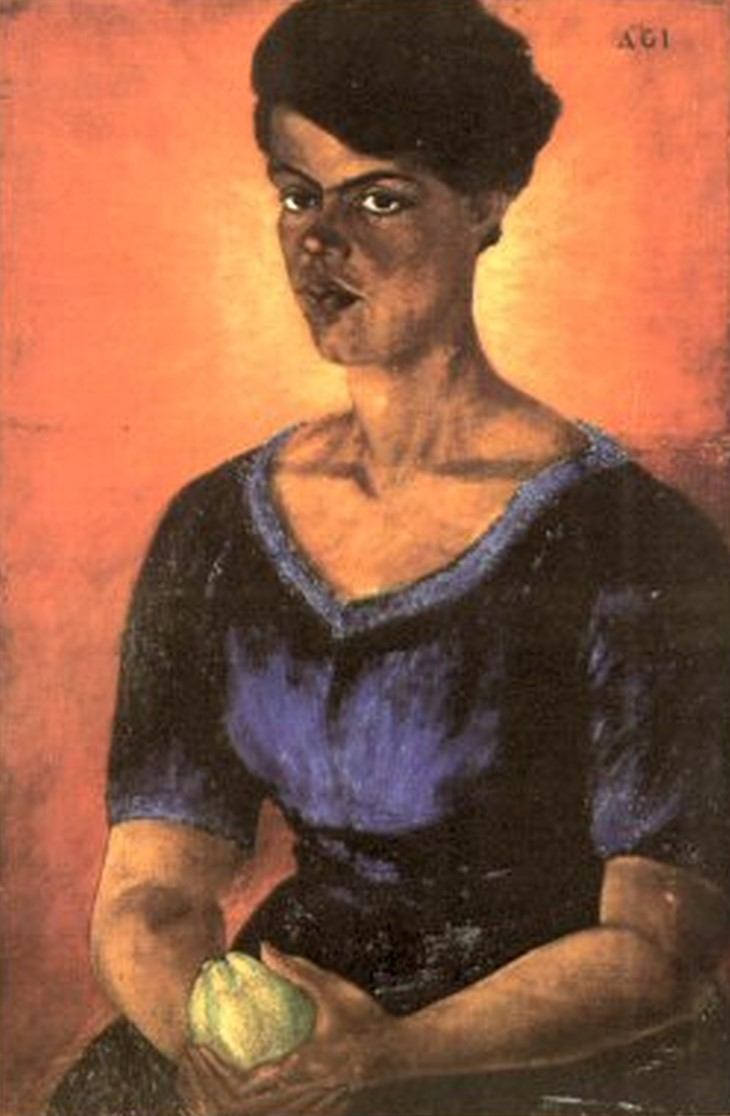
Ágota Fischhof (1918)

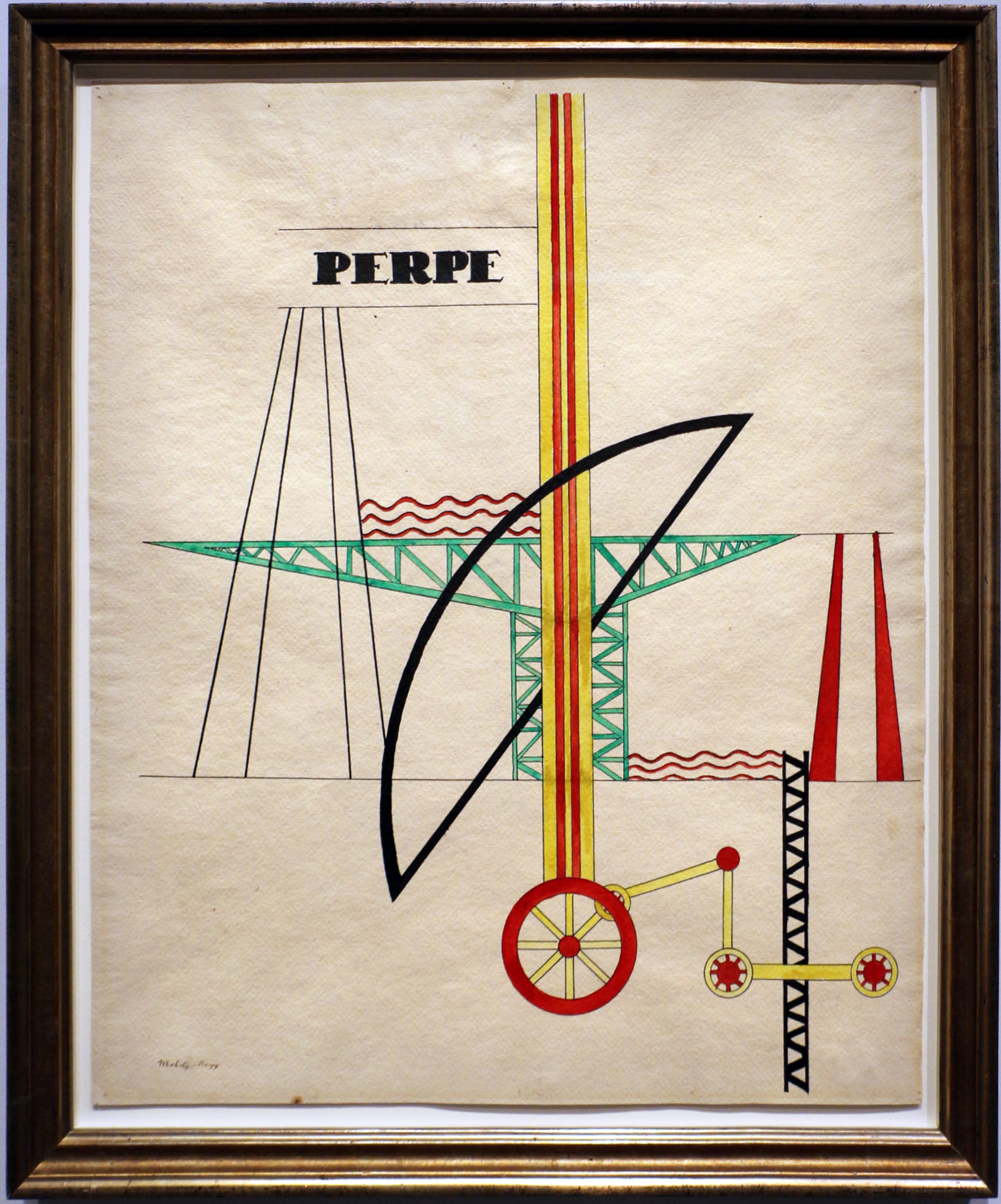
Perpe (1919)

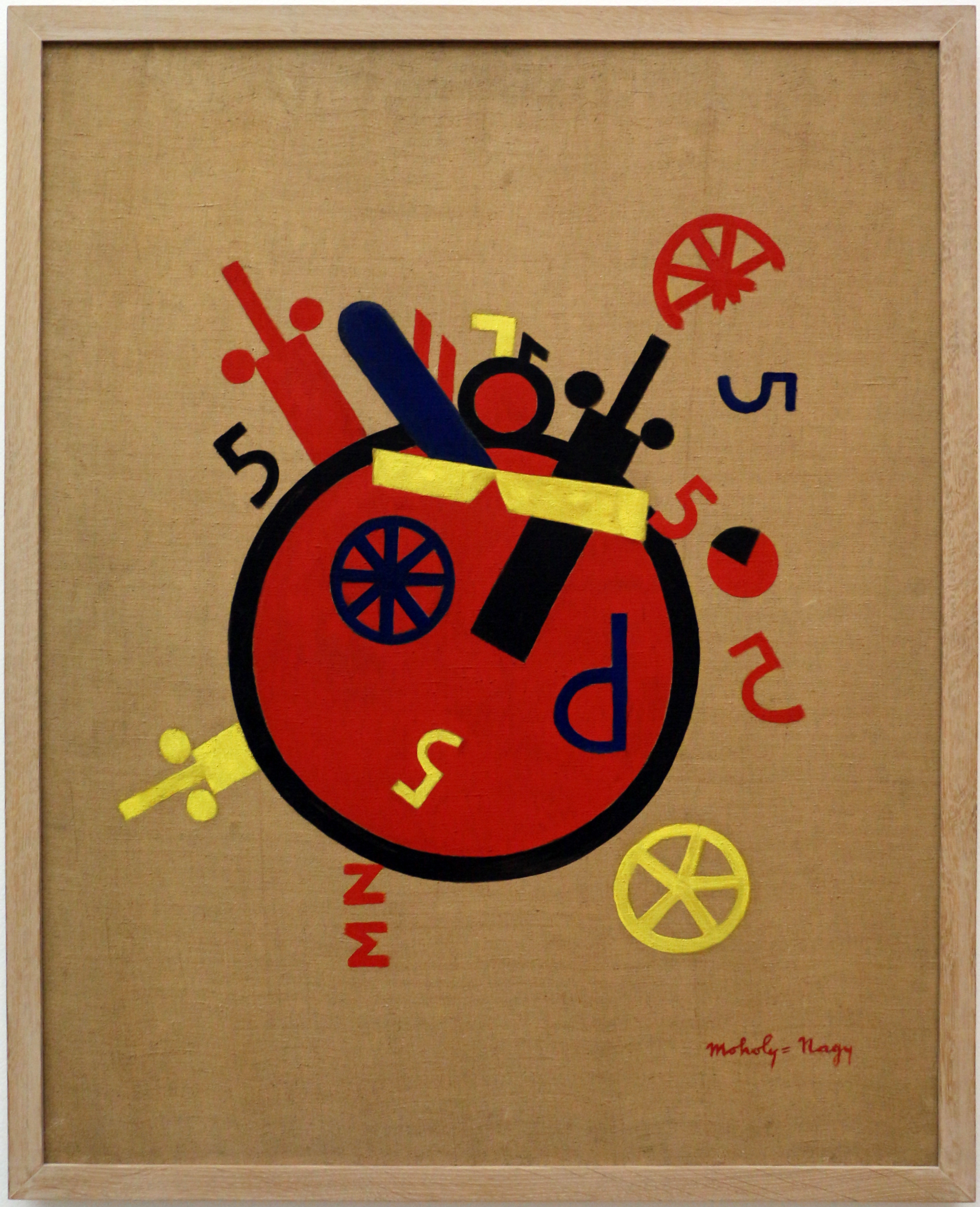
Great machine of emotion (1920)

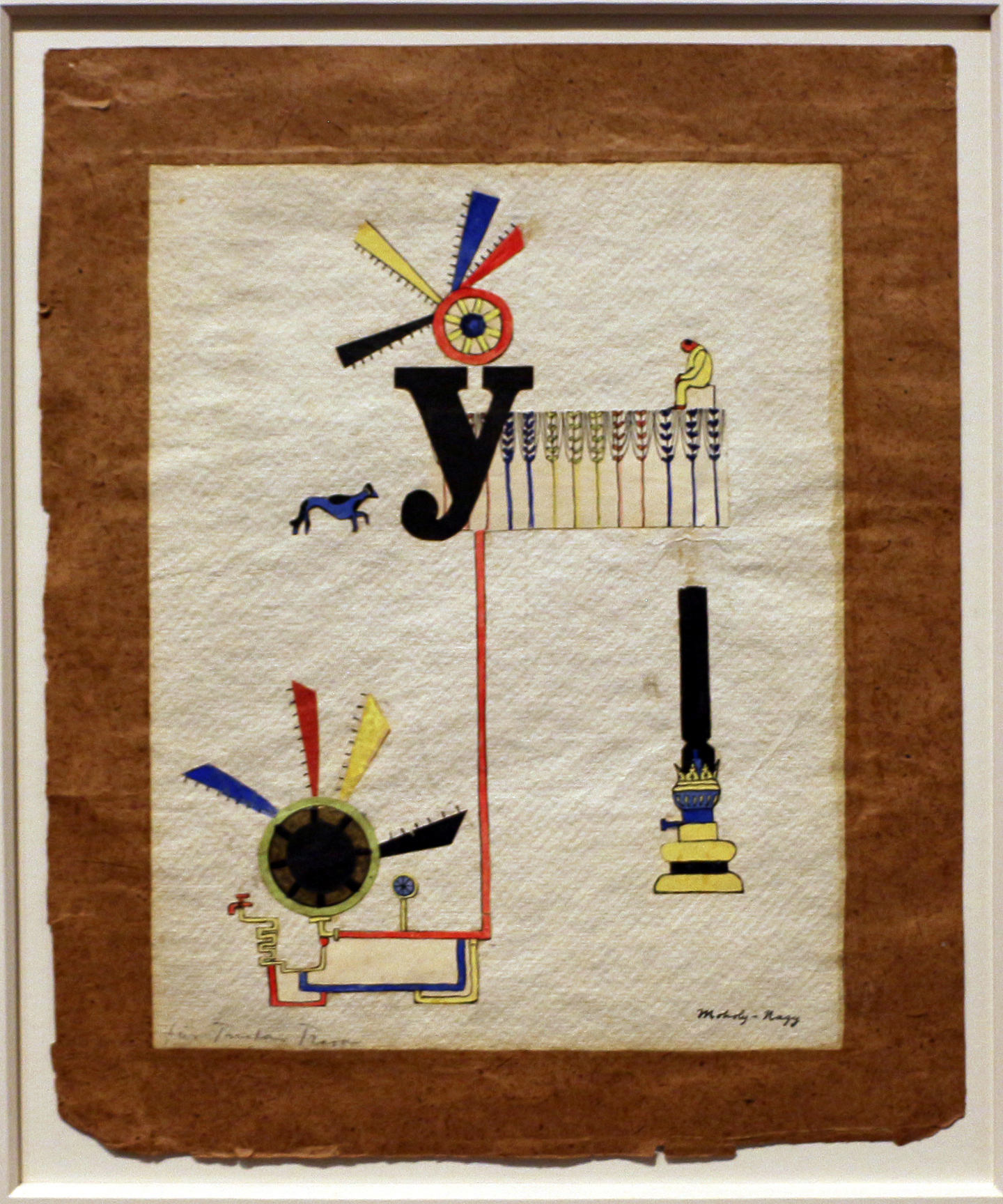
Y (1920–1921)

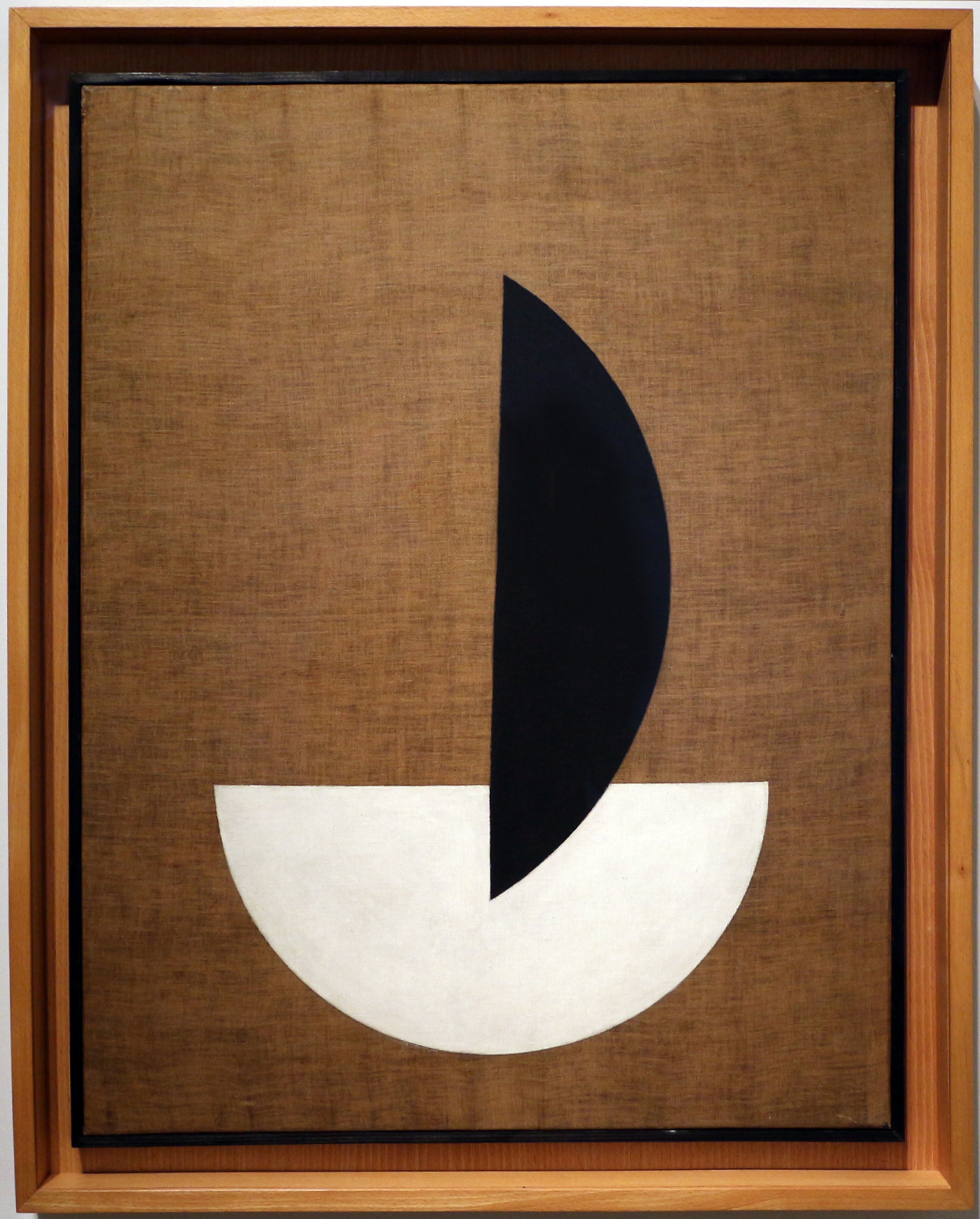
Circular segments (1921)

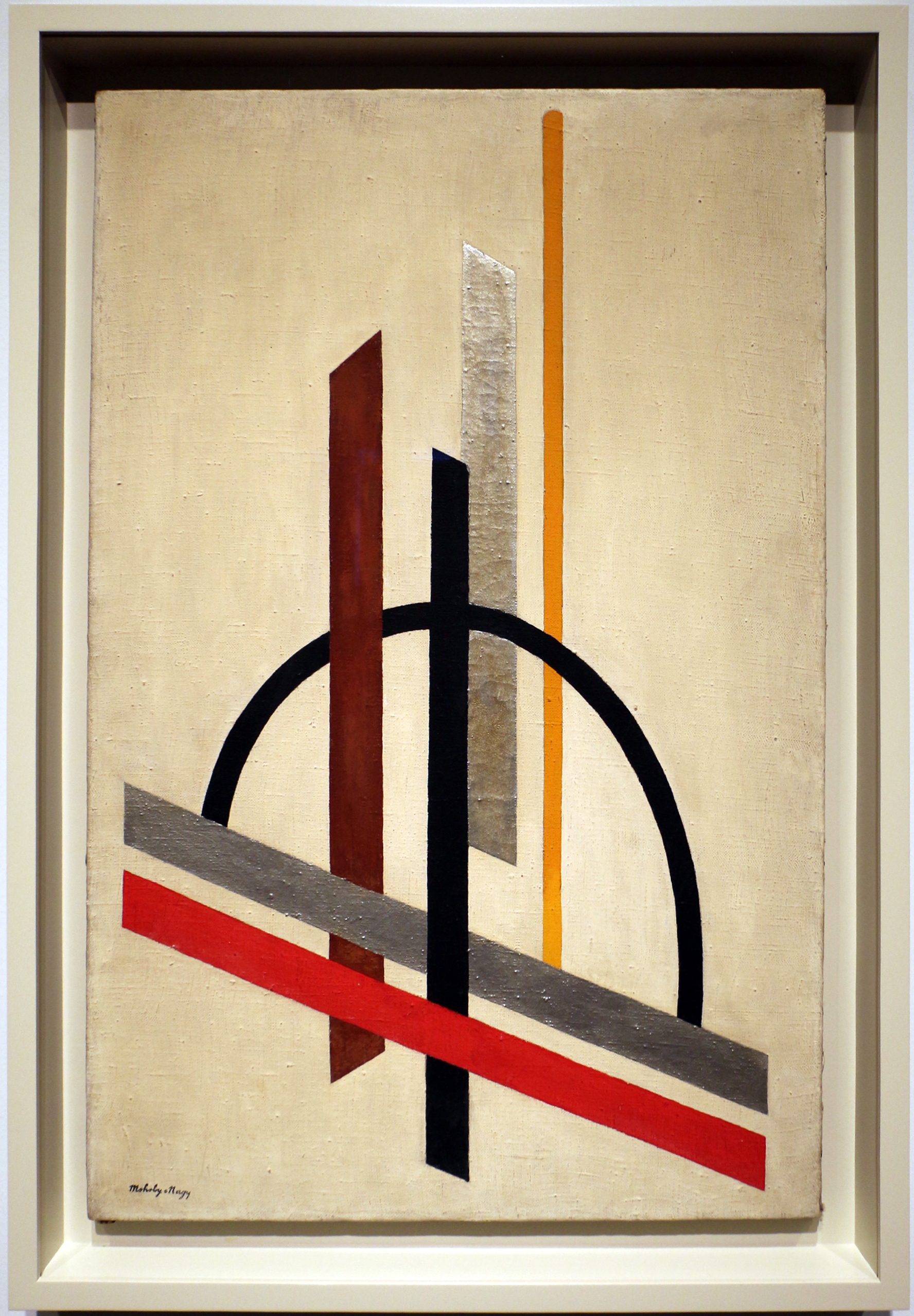
Architecture (Eccentric Construction) (c. 1921)

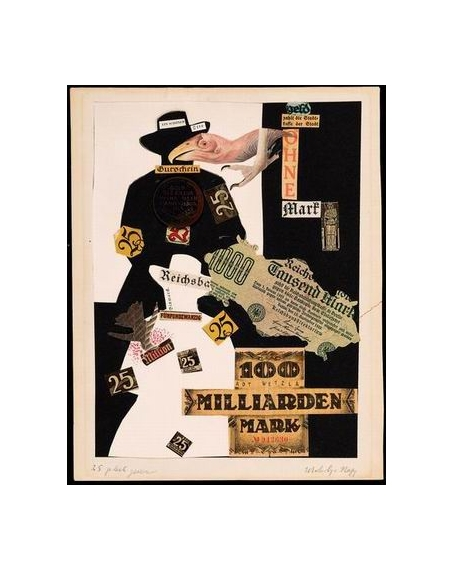
25 bankruptcy vultures (1922)

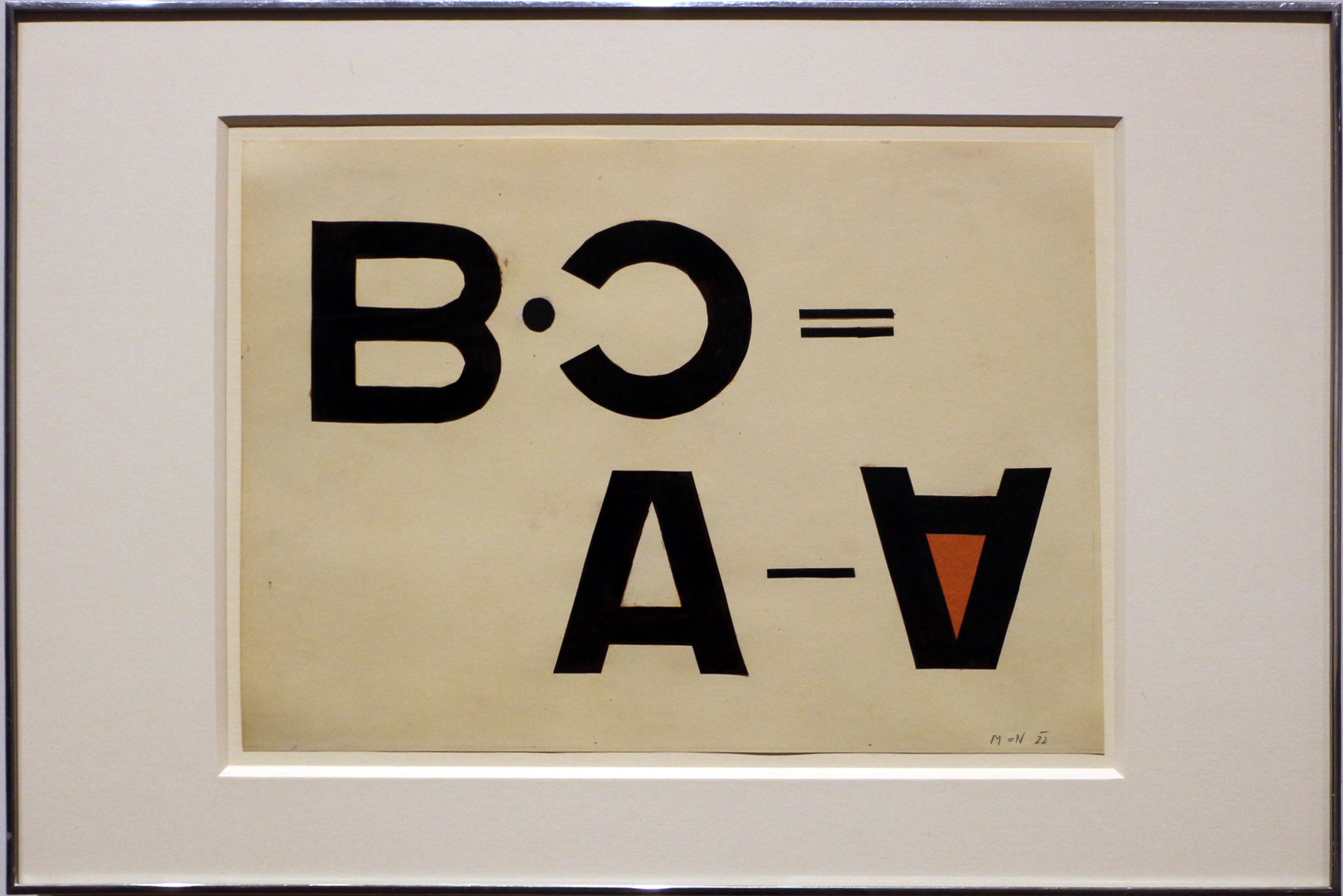
Typographic collage (1922)

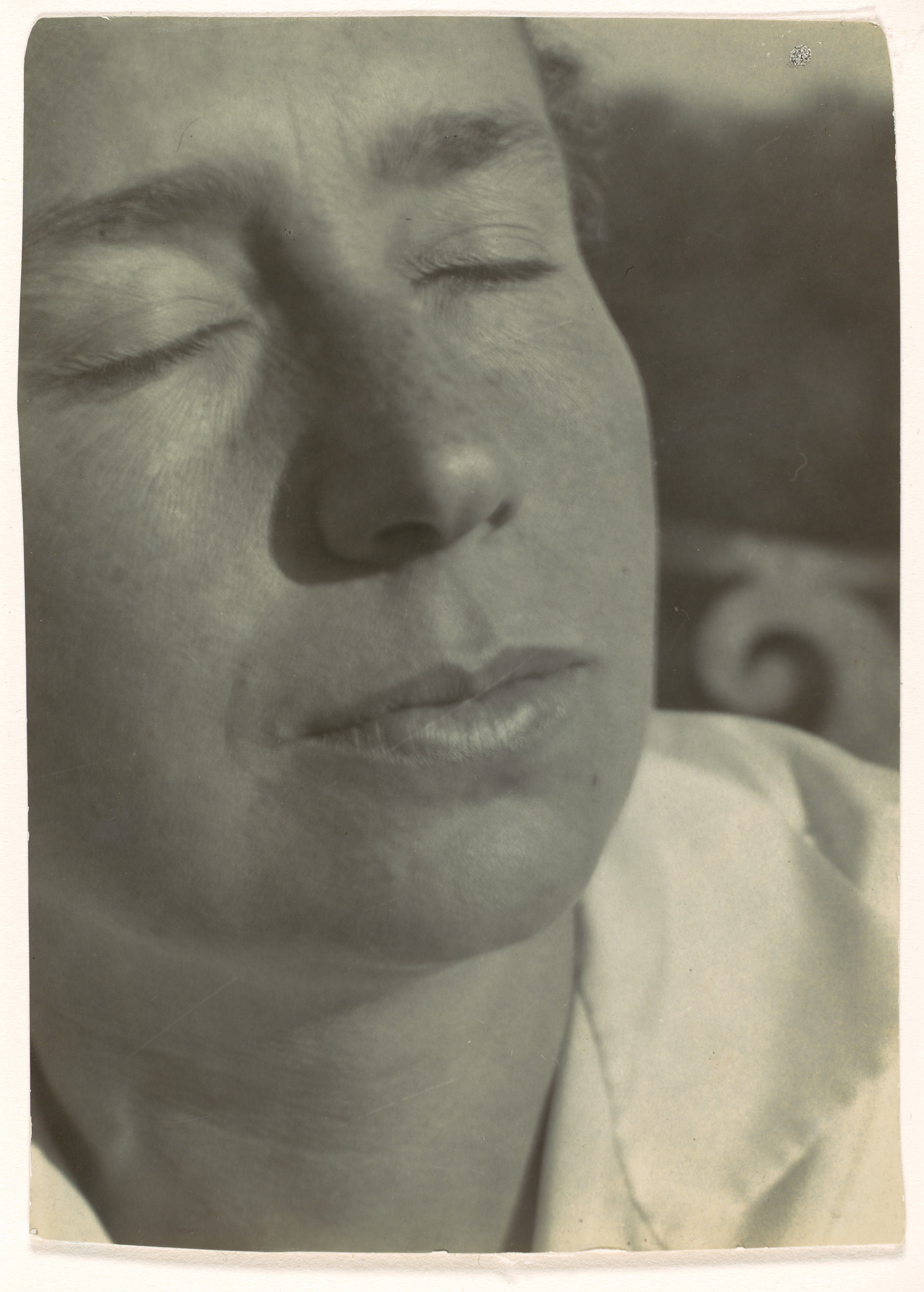
Portrait of Lucia Moholy (1920s)

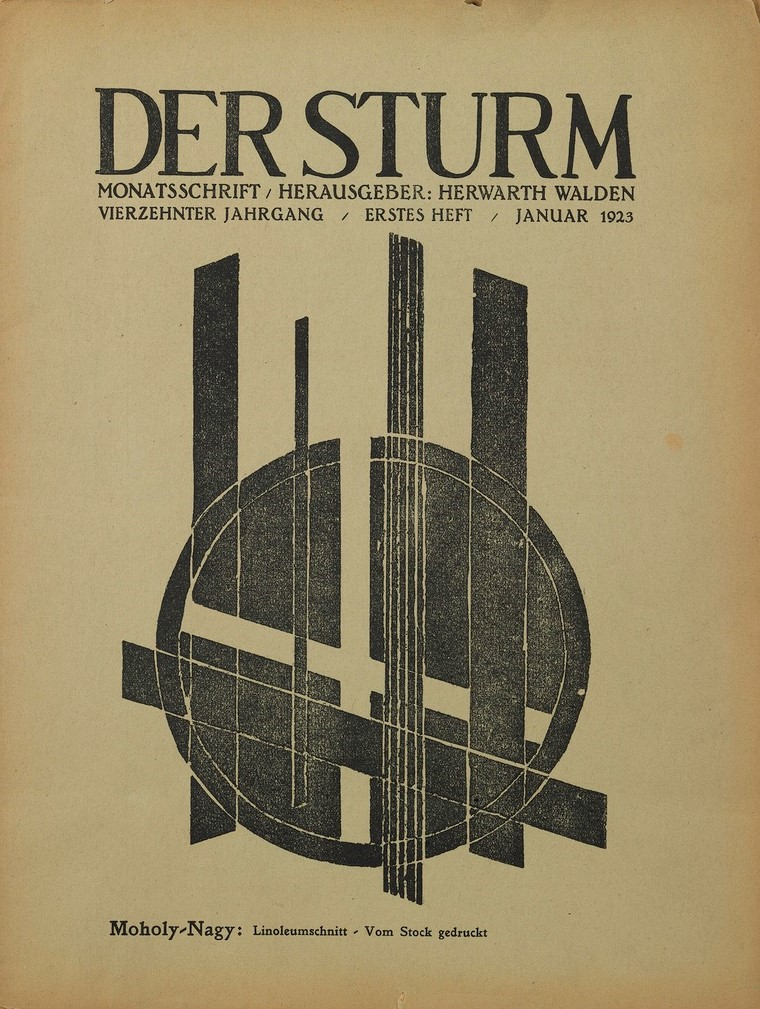
Magazine cover for Der Sturm (1923)

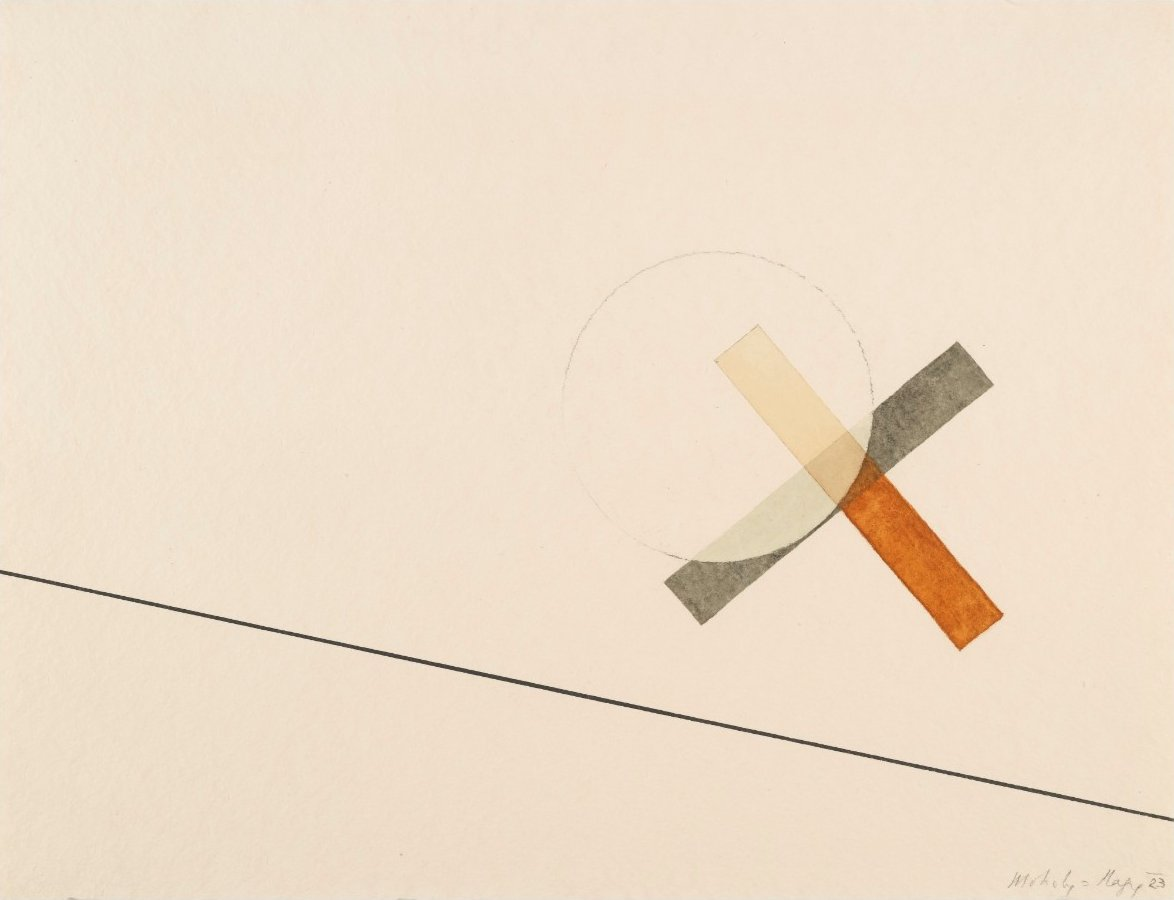
Untitled (1923)

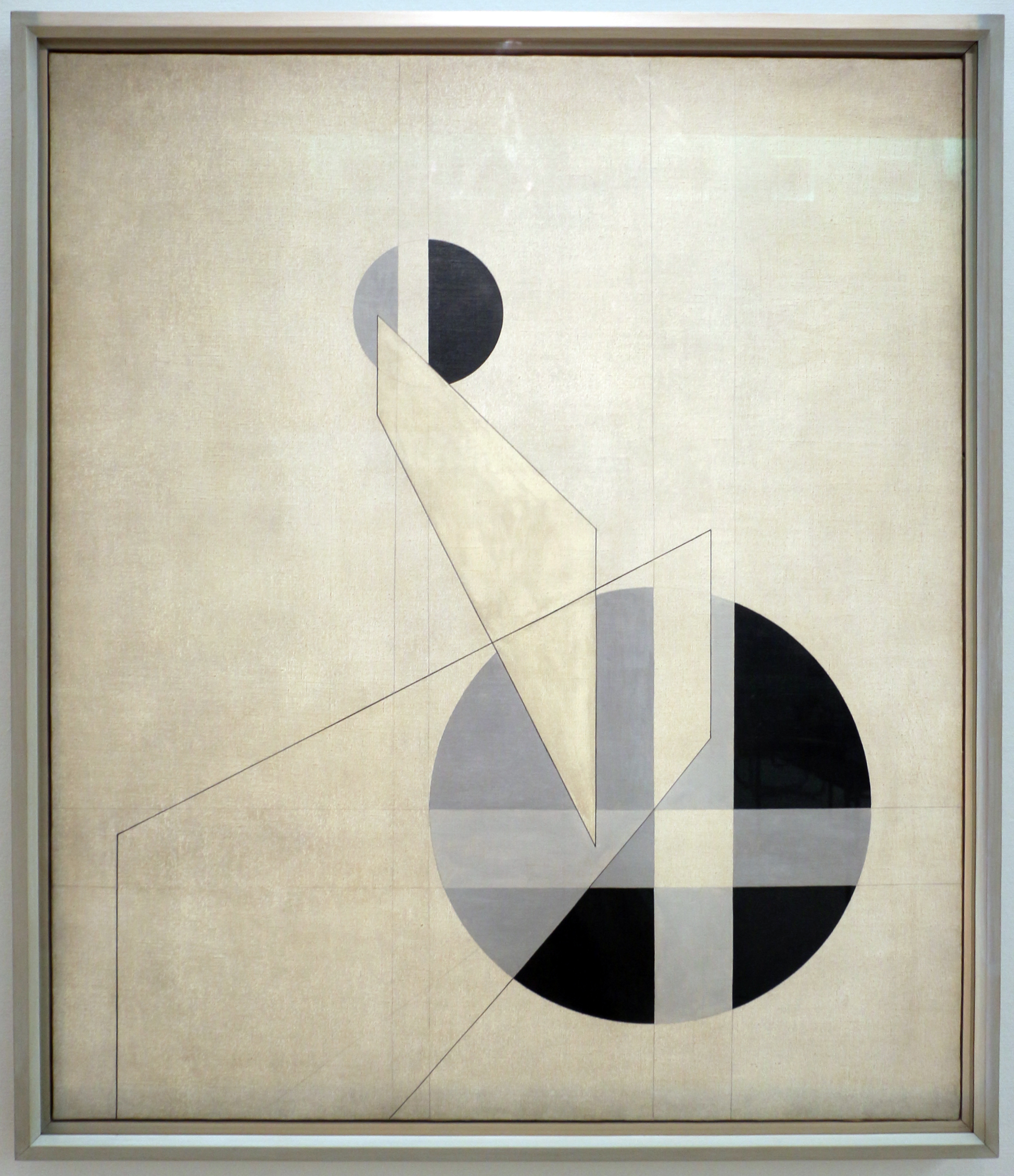
A.XX (1924)

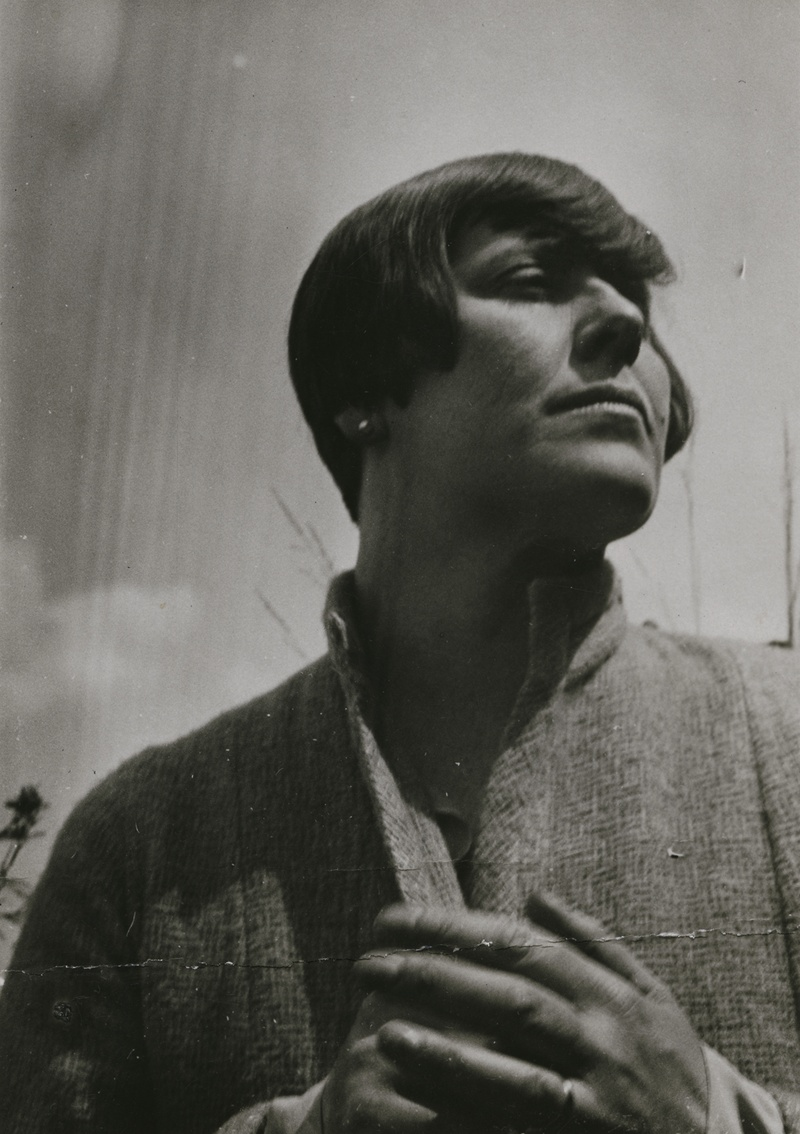
Hilla von Rebay (1924)

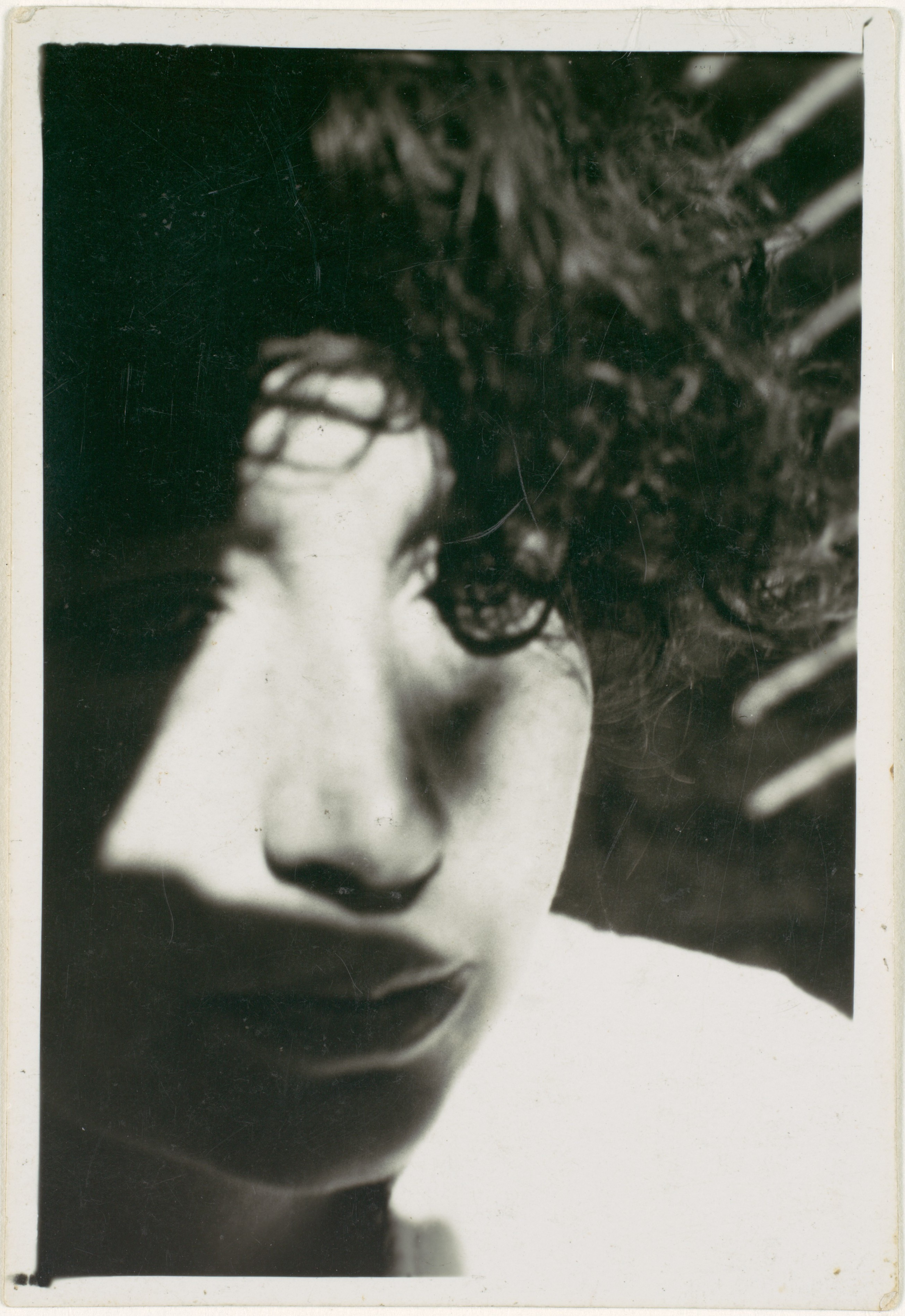
Lucia (c. 1924–1928)

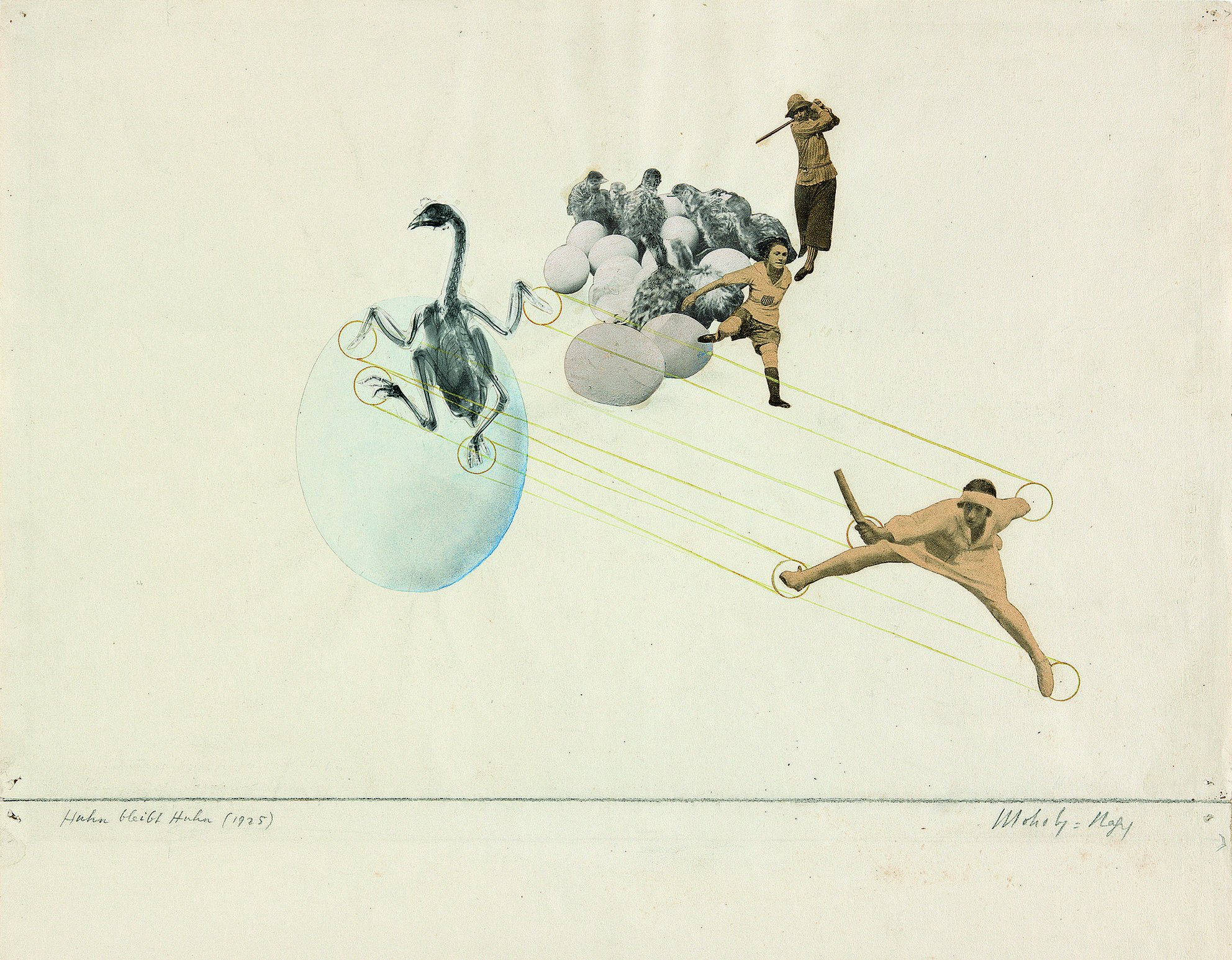
Once a Chicken, Always a Chicken (1925)

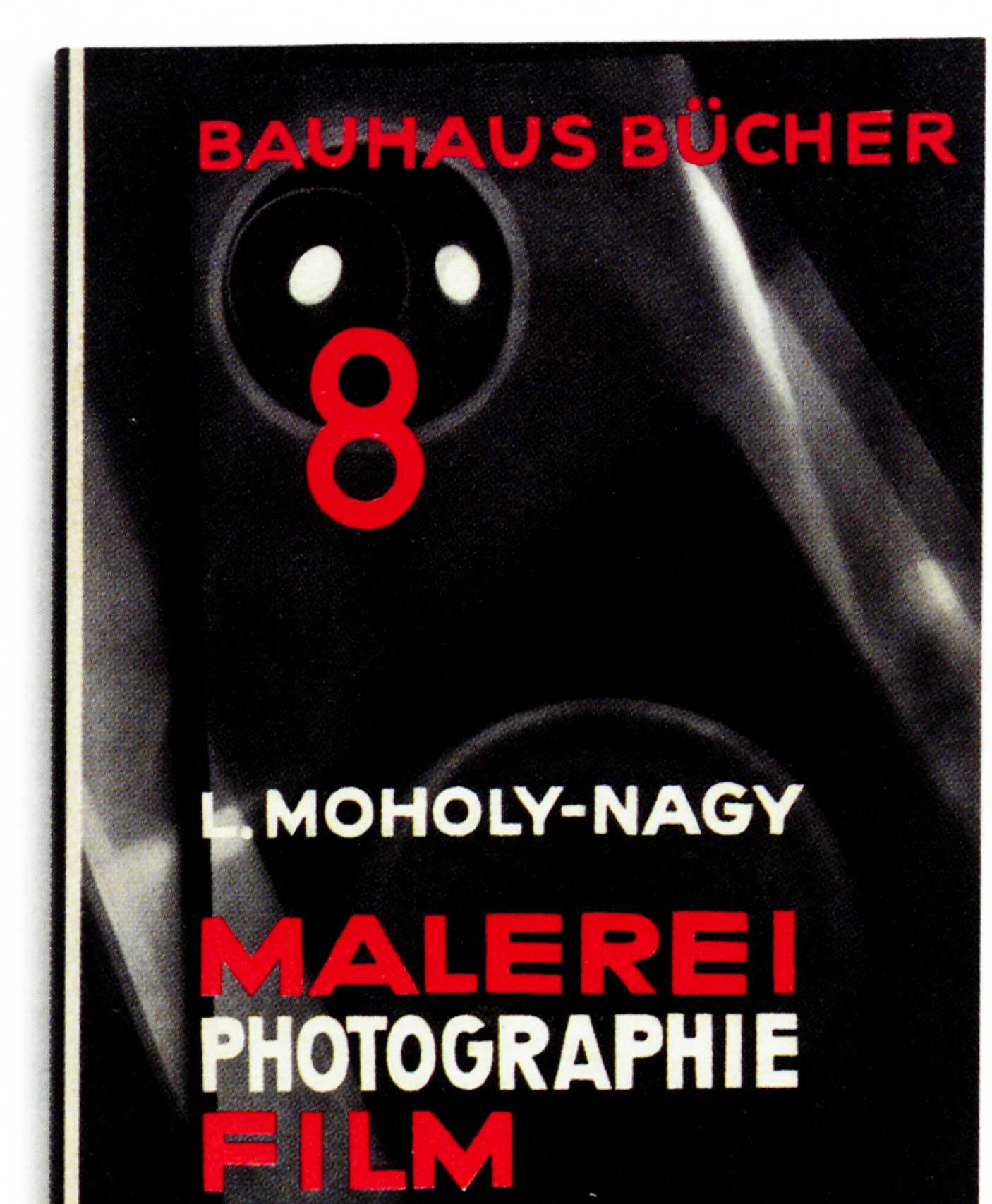
Cover of book published by the Bauhaus(1925)

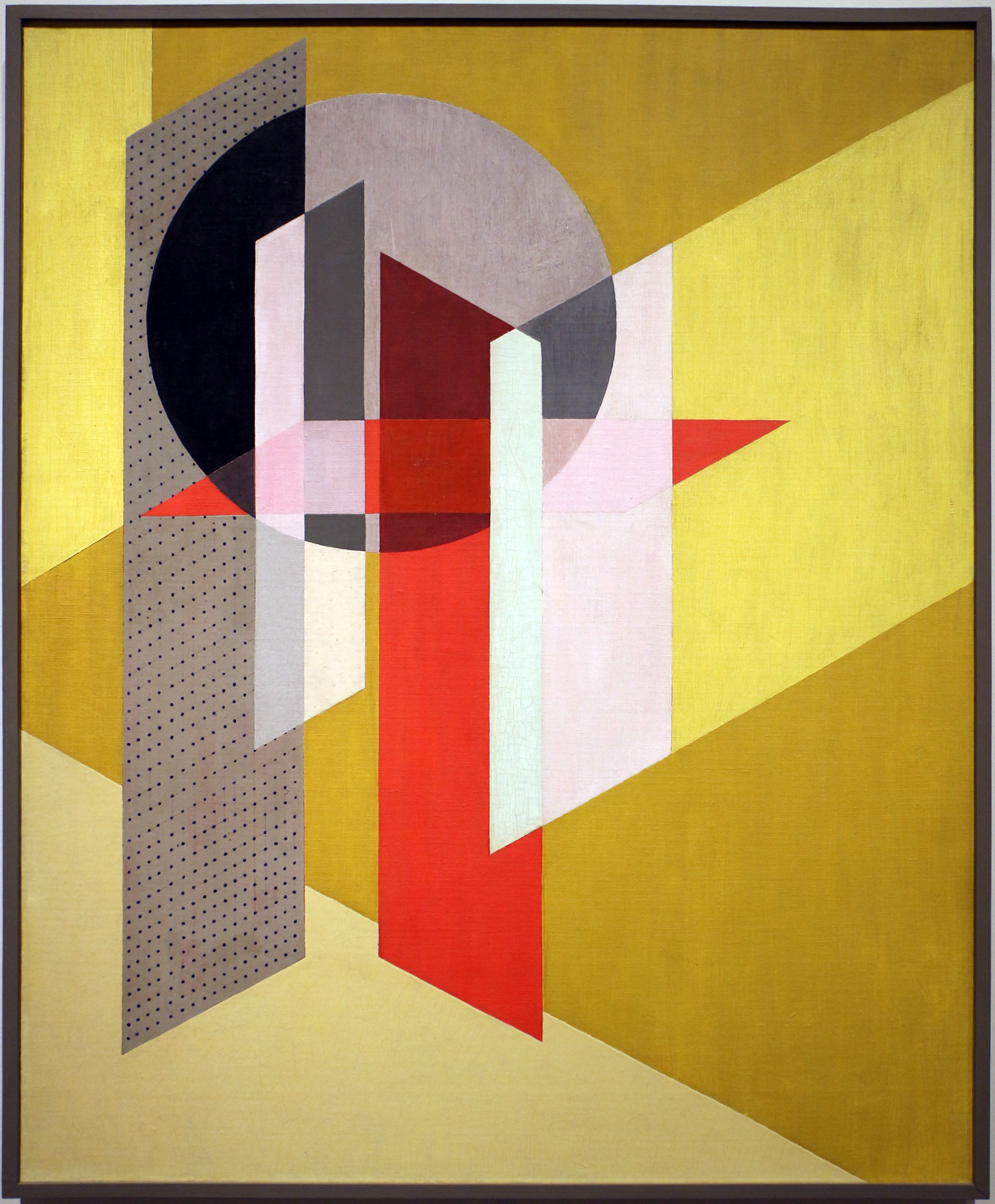
Z VII (1926)

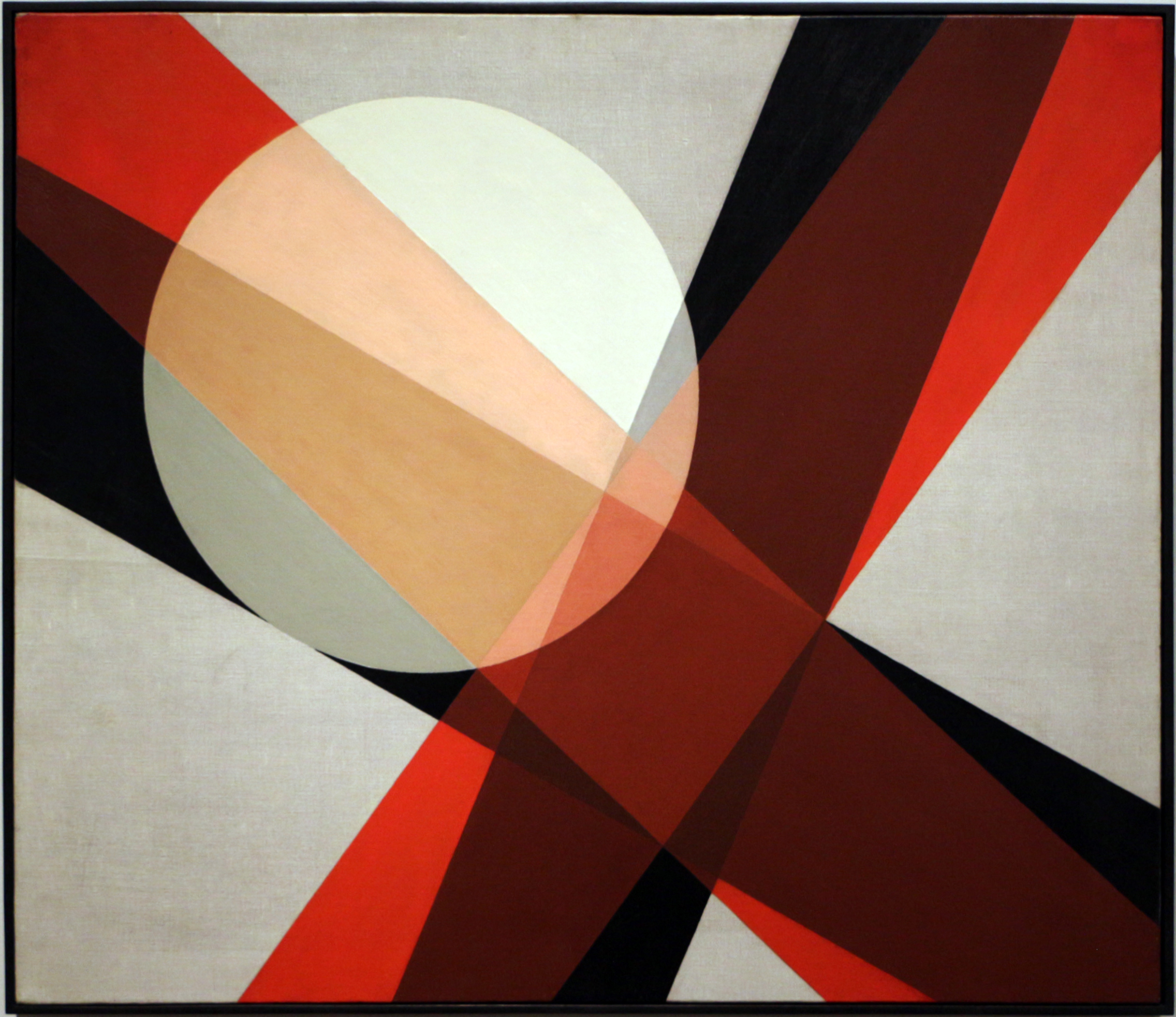
A 19 (1927)

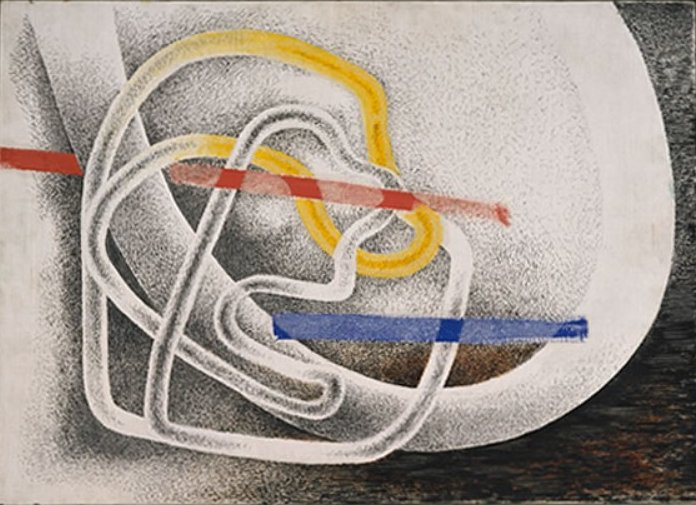
CH XI (1929)

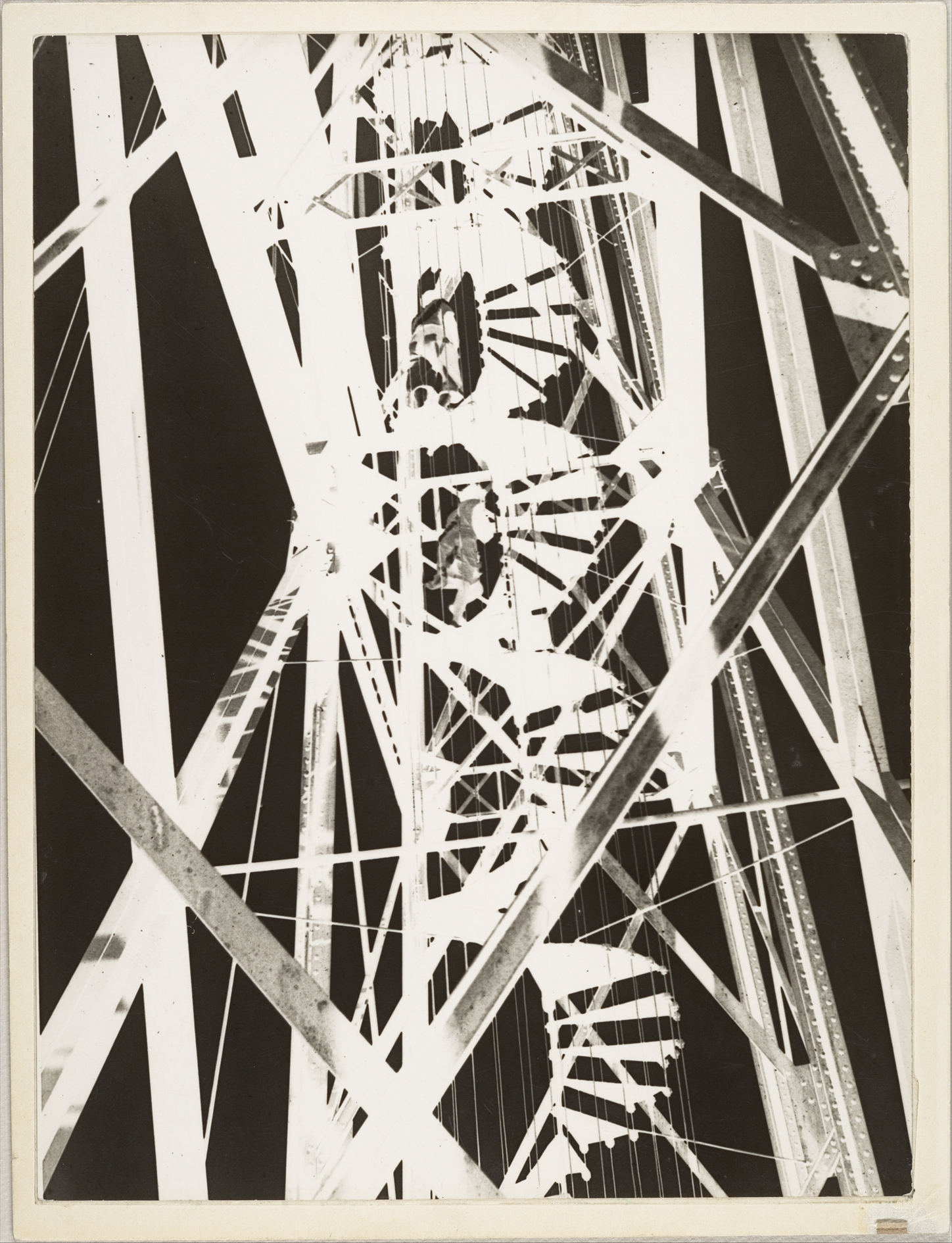
Pont Transbordeur, Marseille (1929)

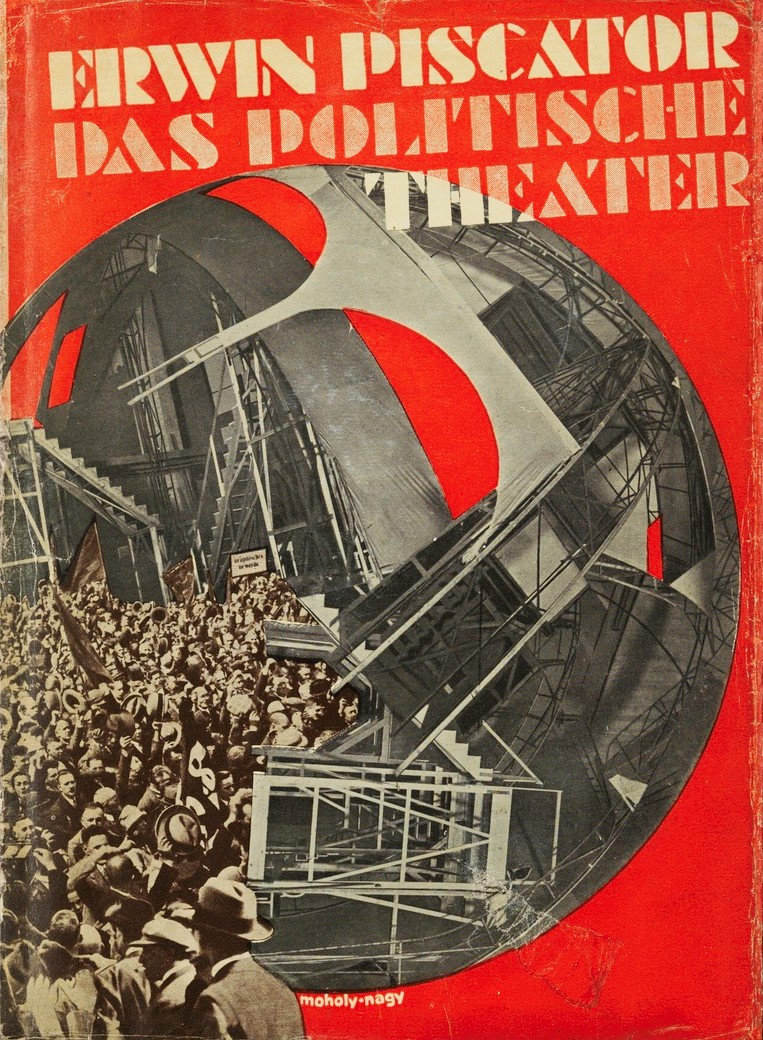
Erwin Piscator – Das politische Theater (1929)

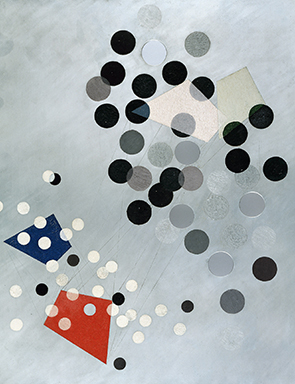
Construction AL6 (1933–1934)

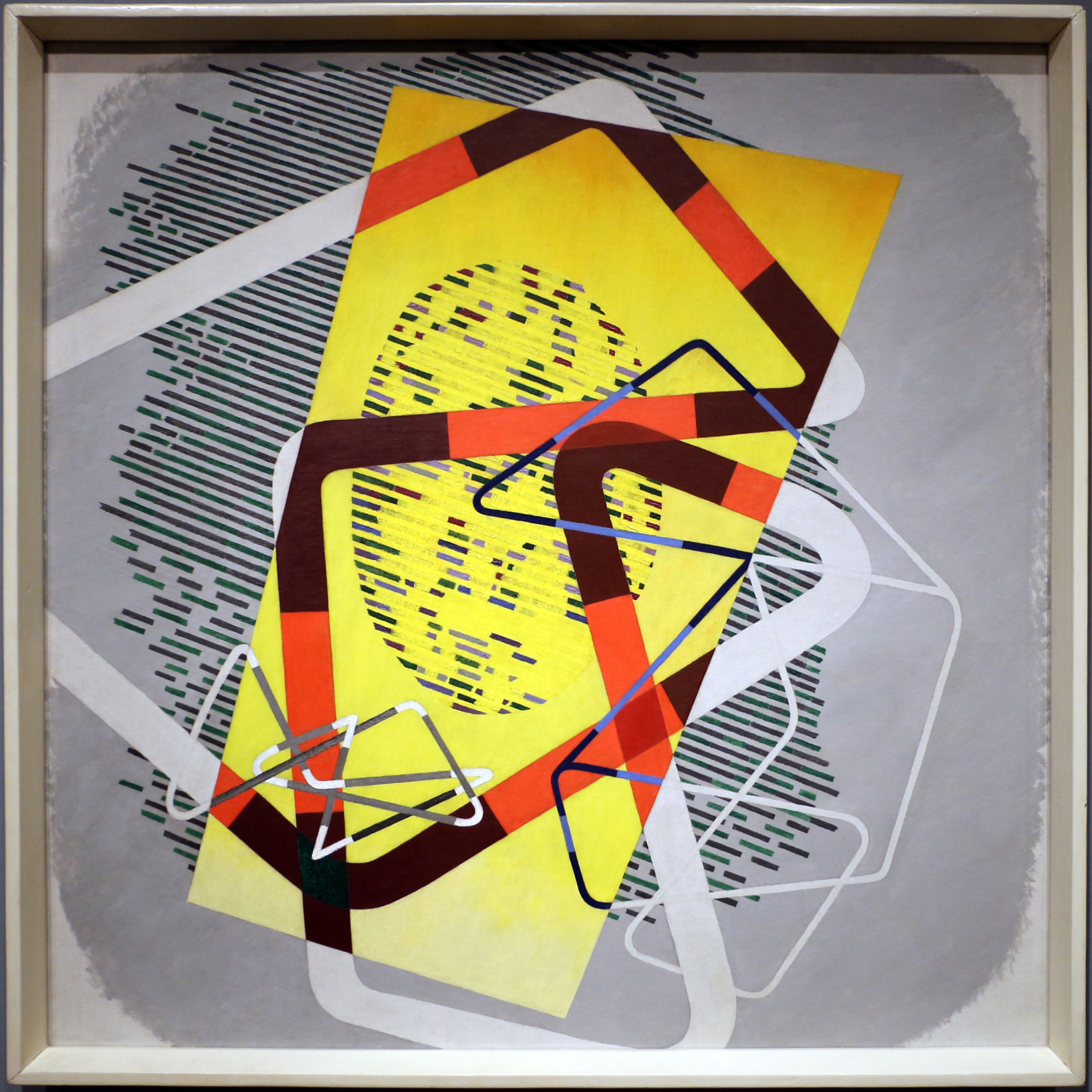
Space modulator (1938–1940)

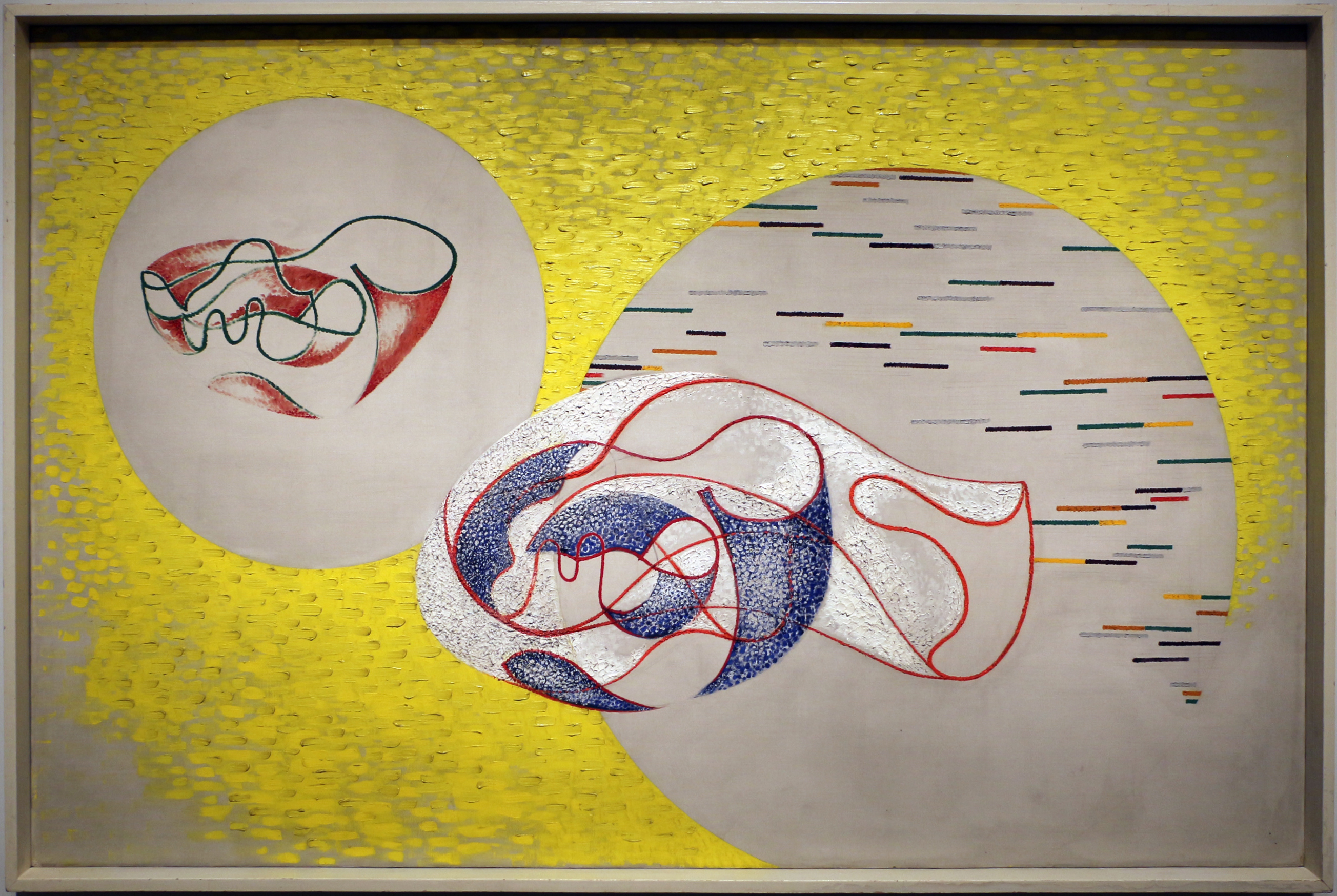
CH B3 (1941)

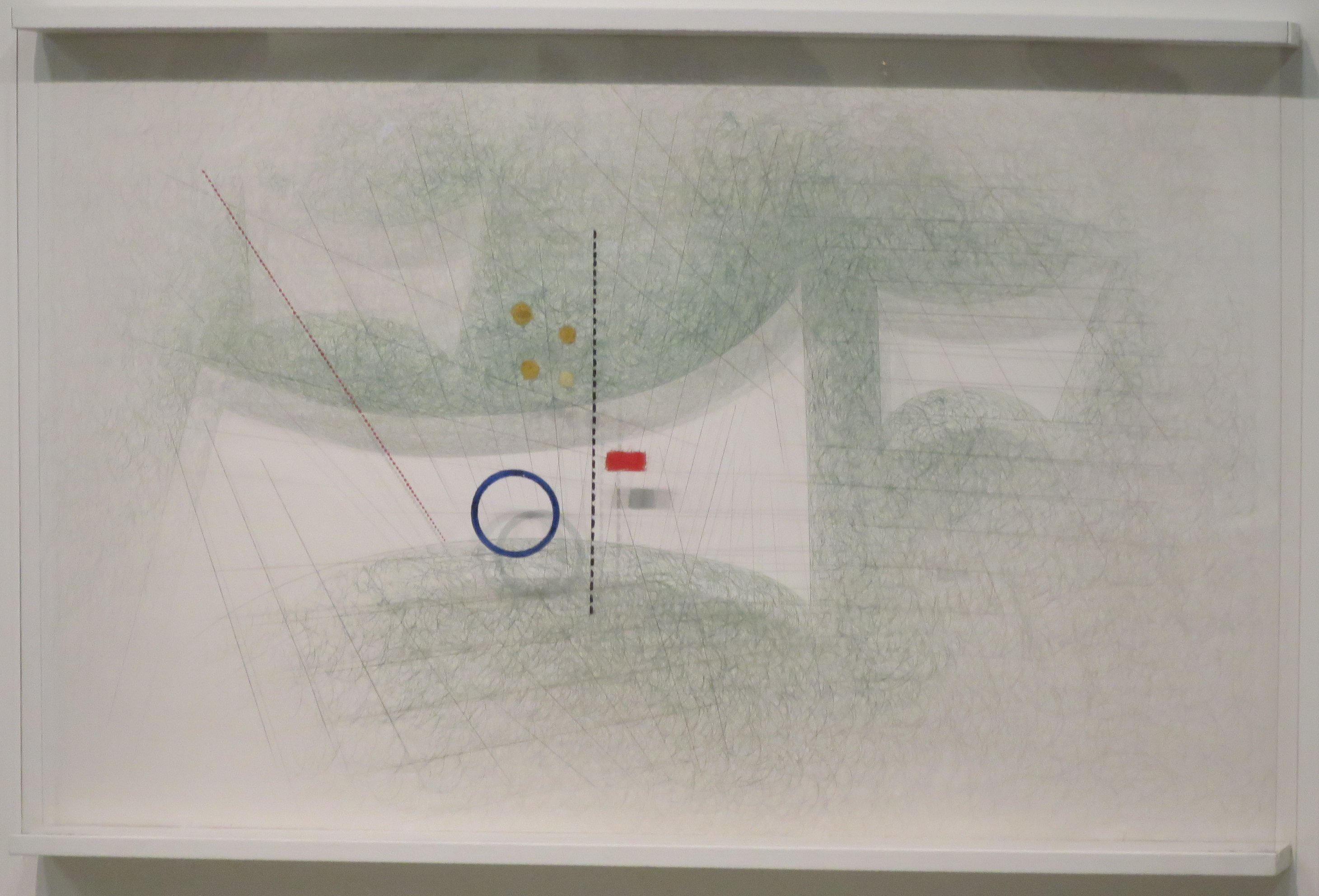
CPL 4 (1941)

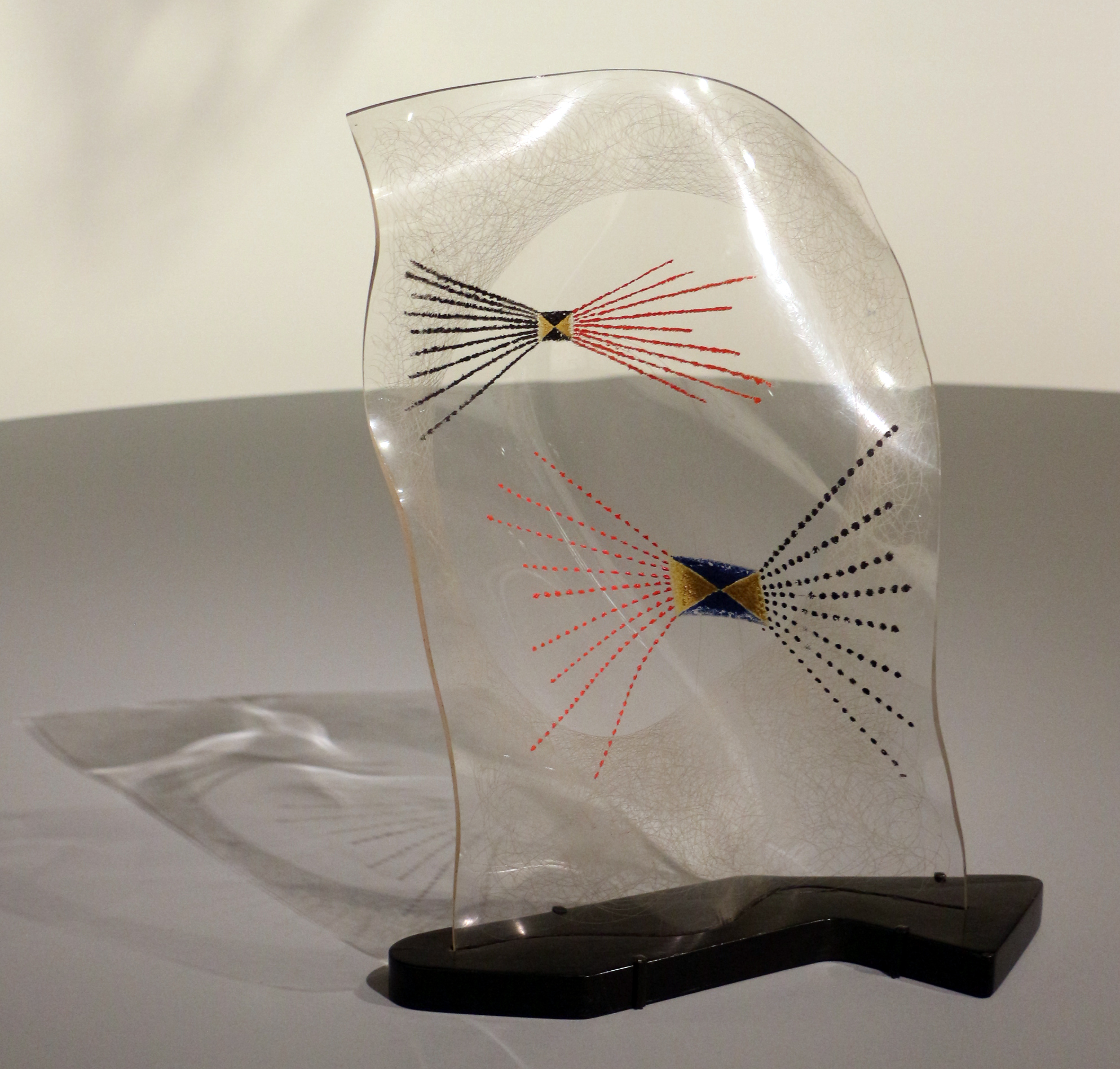
Vertical black, red, and blue (1945)

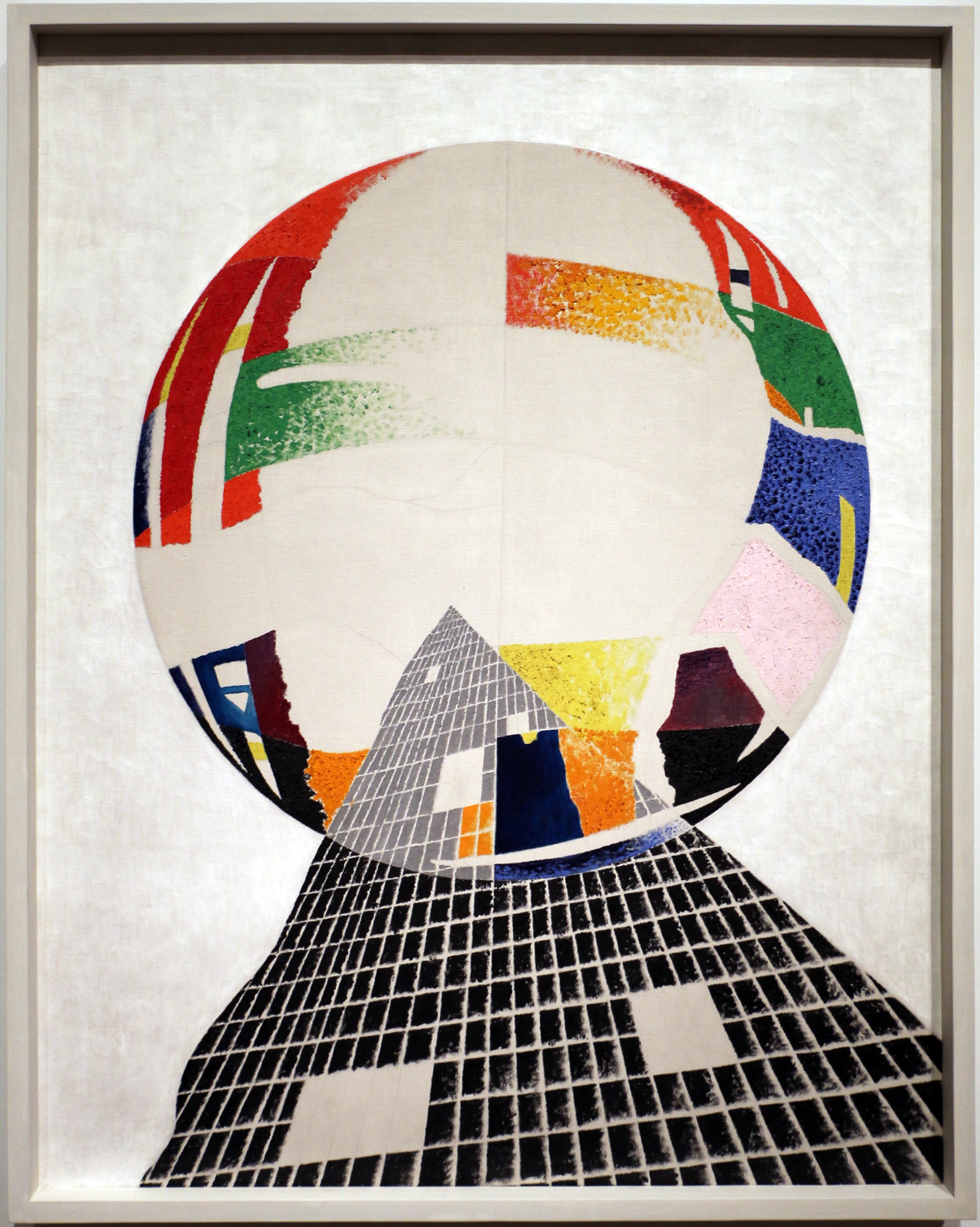
Nuclear I (1945)

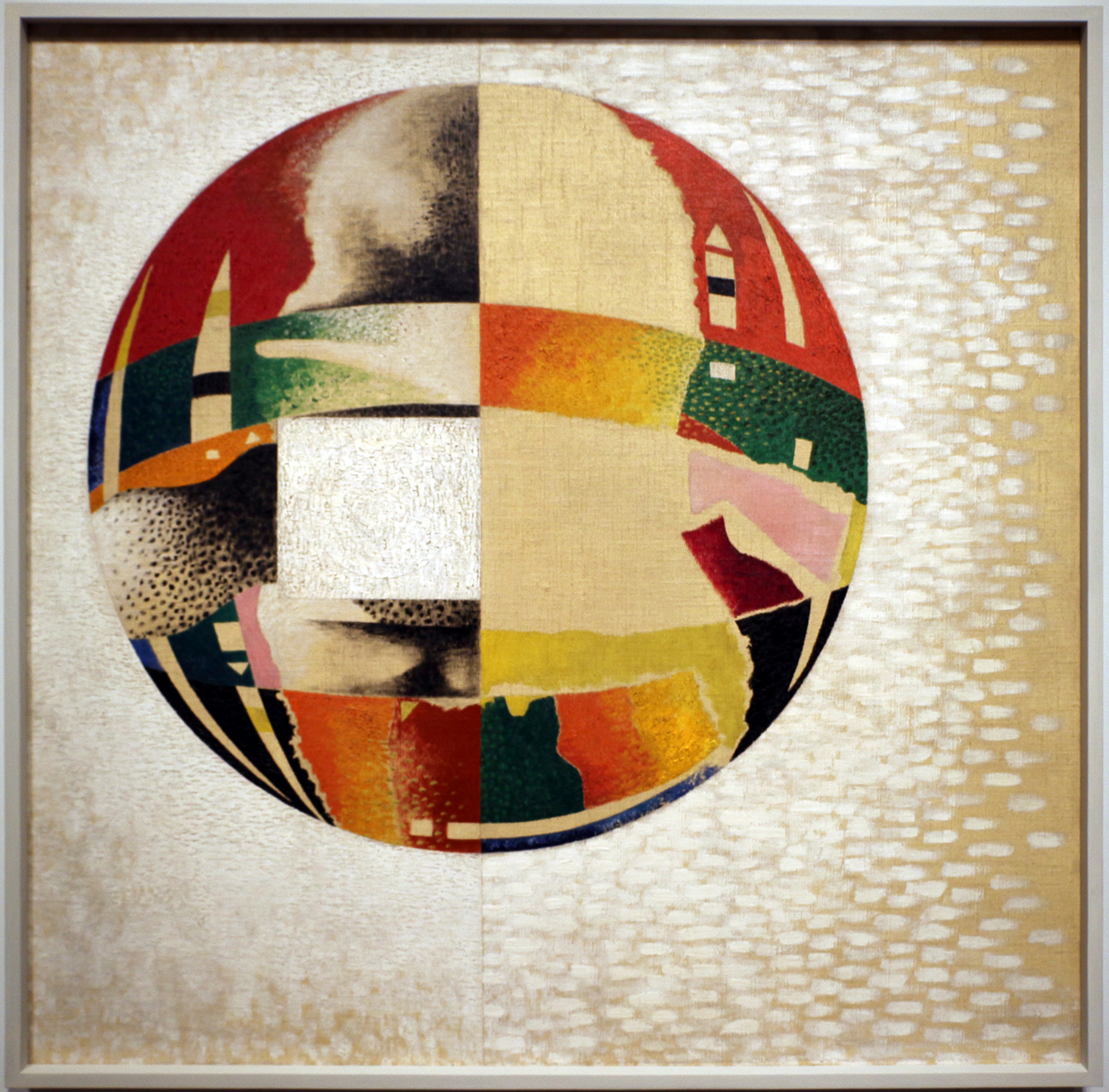
Nuclear II (1946)

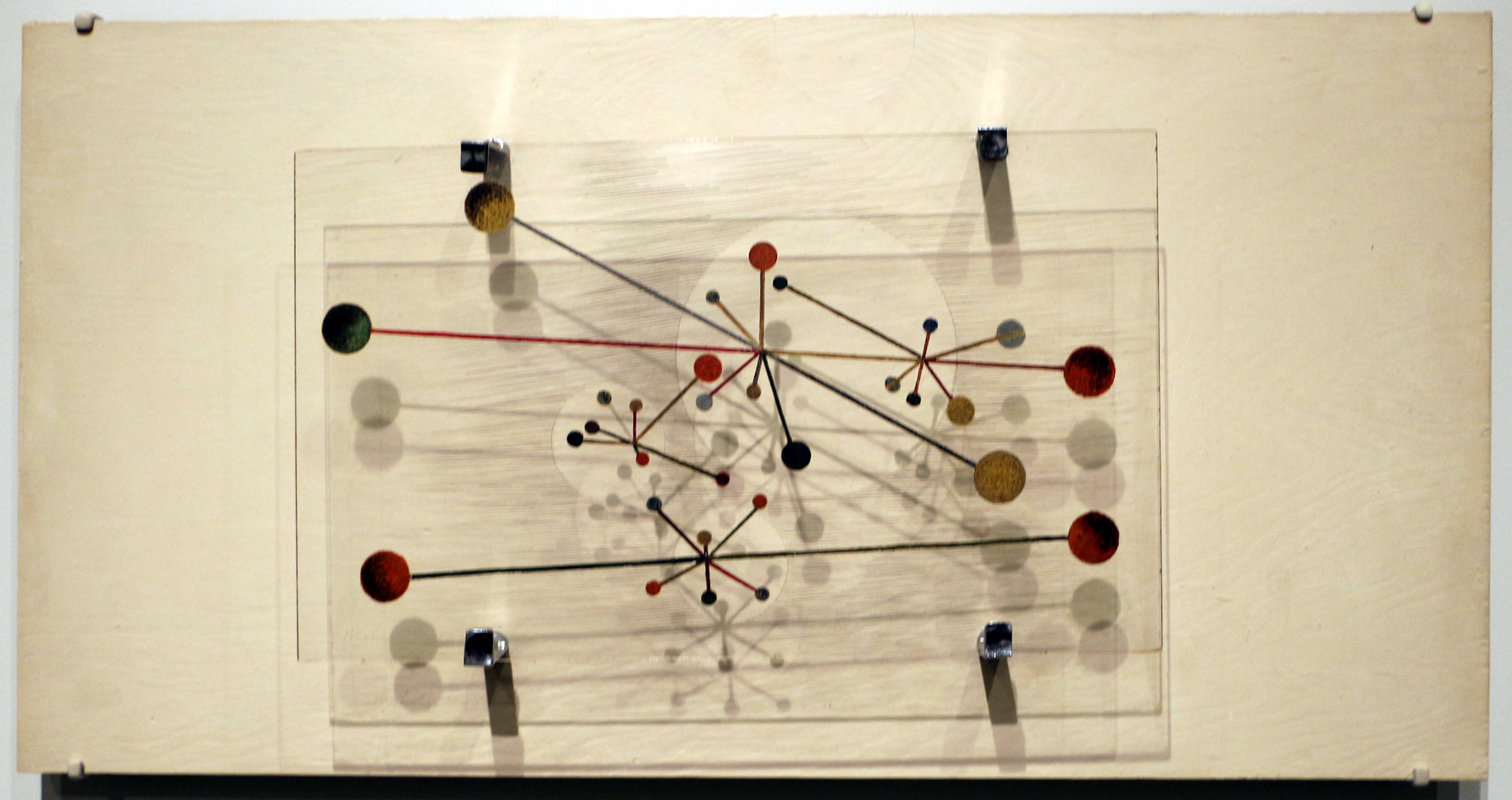
Revolving bars (1946)

== Bibliography ==
- Moholy-Nagy, László. Malerei, Fotografie, Film, Munich: Albert Langen, 1925, 115 pp; 2nd ed., 1927, 140 pp.(German) PDF version: Bauhaus Bücher 8. Malerei, Fotografie, Film (Accessed: January 12, 2017)
- Moholy-Nagy, L. (1947). Vision in motion. P. Theobald.
- Moholy-Nagy, László; Hoffmann, Daphne M. (translator) (2005) The New Vision: fundamentals of Bauhaus design, painting, sculpture, and architecture. Dover, ISBN 9780486436937.

== See also ==
- Artificial obsolescence
- Lumino kinetic art
- Otto Piene – kinetic sculptor directly inspired by Moholy-Nagy's work, including Light-Space Modulator
