= Complex space =

A complex space is a mathematical space based upon complex numbers. Types of complex space include:

- Complex affine space, an affine space over the complex numbers, with no distinguishable point of origin
- Complex analytic space, a generalization of a complex manifold, with singularities allowed
- Complex coordinate space, the set of all ordered n-tuples of complex numbers
- Complex Hilbert space, a complex inner product space that is also a complete metric space
- Complex manifold, in differential geometry, a manifold with an atlas of charts to the open unit disk such that the transition maps are holomorphic
- Complex projective space, a projective space with respect to the field of complex numbers
- Unitary space, a vector space with the addition of an inner-product structure
- Complex vector space, a vector space whose scalar field is the complex numbers
