= Akasztott Ember =

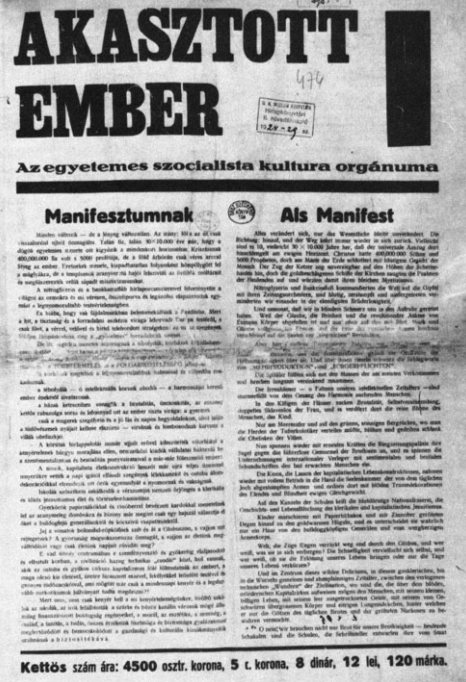
- Editor: Sándor Barta
- Categories: Art magazine
- First issue: November 1922
- Final issue: February 1923
- Country: Austria
- Based in: Vienna
- Language: Hungarian

Akasztott Ember (Hanged Man) was a Hungarian language avant-garde art magazine published in Vienna by Sándor Barta. Five issues appeared between November 1922 and February 1923. It was subtitled "The Organ of Universal Socialist Culture".

Barta had indicated his dissatisfaction with the stance of MA, another Hungarian émigré avant-garde arts magazine based in Vienna in July 1922. He indicated that owing to the need for a social revolution it was inappropriate to base an arts practice in anything other than literature. This set him on a track at odds with both MA and Egység another magazine established by Béla Uitz and Aladár Komját, who likewise broke away from MA. The title was taken from a poem of the same name published in the 15 July issue of MA which commemorated those who had been executed in the suppression by the White Terror following the fall of the Hungarian Soviet Republic. The first issue included a Manifesto in which Barta wrote, in capital letters: "TODAY WE AS PEOPLE FEEL HANGED, AND THOSE WHO DO NOT FEEL HANGED BELONG TO THOSE WHO HANG US AND KICK US."

== Notable contributions ==
- Ernő Kállai: “The Russian Exhibition in Berlin” (Originally published as “A berlini orosz kiállfíás”, Akasztott Ember Vol. 2 (February 15, 1923)]

== See also ==
- List of avant-garde magazines
