= Erzsi Újvári =

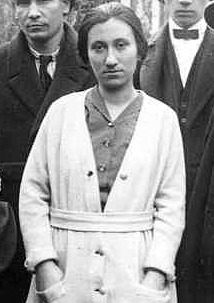
Erzsi Újvári in Vienna, 1922

Erzsi Újvári (born Erzsébet Kassák) (14 July 1899, Érsekújvár-11 August 1940, Moscow) was a Hungarian poet.

Her parents were Istvan Kassák and Erzsébet Istenes, and Lajos Kassák was her brother. In 1912 she moved to Budapest and got work in a textiles factory. Influenced by her brother she became involved in literature, and joined him in founding the avant-garde journals A Tett (1915–16) and MA. She married the poet Sándor Barta.

Along with many other avant-garde writers, she left Hungary after the fall of the Hungarian Soviet Republic.

== Published works ==
- Prózák (Prose) Vienna:MA 1921, illustrated by George Grosz
- Csikorognak a kövek (The Stones Roar) Budapest: Szépirodalmi Könyvkiadó, 1986
