= János Mácza =

Hungarian and Soviet art theorist and historian (1893–1974)

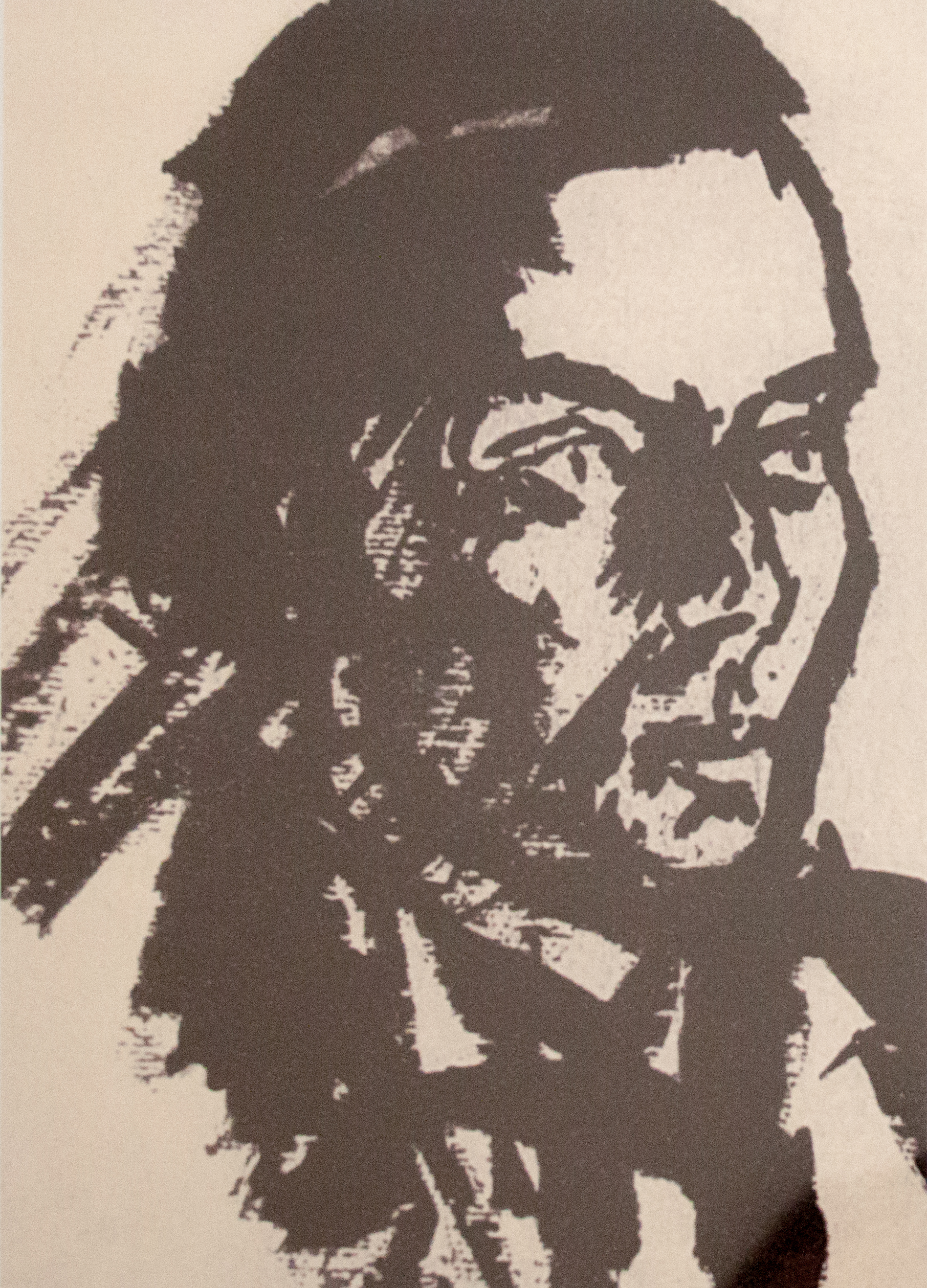
Portrait of János Mácza by József Nemes Lampérth

János Mácza (4 August 1893 in Alsóhrabóc – 14 November 1974 in Moscow) was Hungarian and Soviet art theorist, critic and historian.

== Biography ==
Mácza was born in to a teacher's family. Initially studying to become a pharmacist, he left for Budapest and from 1915, he wrote for the monthly magazines A Tett and MA from 1916, both edited by Lajos Kassák. During the short-lived Hungarian Soviet Republic, Mácza was deputy director of the Budapest National Theatre in 1919.

After the collapse of the Soviet Republic in August 1919, Mácza left for Prague and then Vienna, where he joined the Hungarian Communist Party. He returned his native Upper Hungary and was co-editor of the communist newspaper Kassai Munkás in Kassa, which was now part of Czechoslovakia. The Hungarian-language paper played a pioneering role in the presentation and translation of the new Soviet art and literature.

In 1923, Mácza moved to the Soviet Union and joined the Communist Party of the Soviet Union that same year. His academic work in the 1920s focused on aesthetic theory and the theory and history of architecture. In Moscow, he initially taught art theory at various educational institutions; from 1928 onward, he taught art theory at Moscow State University, where he was appointed professor in 1930. There, in 1933, he began collecting valuable documents of artistic activities from the Soviet avant-garde era. From 1928 to1932 he was a member of the Constructivist art association October and a member of the OSA magazine's journal Contemporary Architecture. Later he became chairman of the VOPRA (All-Russian Society of Proletarian Architects). From 1930 to 1936 he was a corresponding member of the Communist Academy.

From 1934 to 1954, Mácza lectured at the Academy of Architecture. In 1936, he received the degree of Doctor of Sciences. From 1954 to 1970, he taught aesthetics and industrial design theory at the MSU. In 1962, his textbook on the history of the science of aesthetics was published. His estate is preserved in the Petőfi Literary Museum in Budapest.
