= Béla Uitz =

Hungarian painter and communist activist

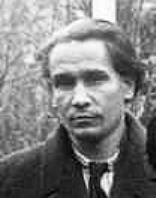
Béla Uitz in 1922

Béla Uitz (8 March 1887, Mehála, Kingdom of Hungary (today part of Timișoara, Romania) – 26 January 1972, Budapest, Hungary) was a Hungarian painter, graphic artist and communist activist.

In 1907 he studied at the Hungarian National School of Applied Arts before moving on to the Hungarian Academy of Fine Arts in 1908.

He was a contributor to the anarchist-pacifist magazine A Tett, published by Lajos Kassák 1915–1916. After A Tett was suppressed by the authorities, Kassák launched MA in 1917 and Uitz joined the editorial team.

He attended the "Russian Evening" organised by MA on 20 November 1920 in Vienna. This led him to rethink his political-artistic stance. In "Jegyzetek a 'Ma' orosz estélyéhez" (Notes on MAs Russian evening) an article published in MA he was very critical of the Russian Proletkult movement which he viewed as an obstacle to the parallel progress of the material and spiritual revolution he envisaged. Nevertheless, he later developed a more sympathetic view of Proletkult. He then joined the Communist Party of Hungary who sent him with Alfréd Kemény to attend the 3rd Congress of the Communist International. Whilst in Moscow he met Jolán Szilágyi, a Hungarian studying at VKhUTEMAS.

He was the editor of Egység, a radical art journal published in Vienna and Berlin, 1922–1924. Aladár Komját was his co-editor.
