= Ernest Zmeták Art Gallery =

Art museum in Nové Zámky, Slovakia

Coordinates: 47.984548°N 18.16414°E

The Ernest Zmeták Art Gallery (Slovak: Galéria umenia Ernesta Zmetáka, Hungarian: Ernest Zmeták Művészeti Galéria) is an art museum in Nové Zámky, Slovakia.

The museum was established on 1 January 1979 by a local painter, Ernest Zmeták, who was the most significant collector of artworks in Slovakia in the 2nd half of the 20th century, and his wife, art historian Danica Zmetákova. At first it was housed temporarily on the second floor of the City Hall where the first permanent exhibition was opened on November 21, 1980. It was moved in 2003 into the former Craftsmen Association Building on 1 Björnsonova Street where the new permanent exhibitions were opened in March and June 2004.

The art gallery has two permanent exhibitions. The first one, called ″European Art of the 16th to 20th Century″ is based on the donation of Ernest Zmeták. This was rearranged in 2016 and a new catalogue was published. The second one presents the works of art of a local Hungarian avantgarde artist and writer, Lajos Kassák.
