= Ernő Kállai =

Hungarian art critic

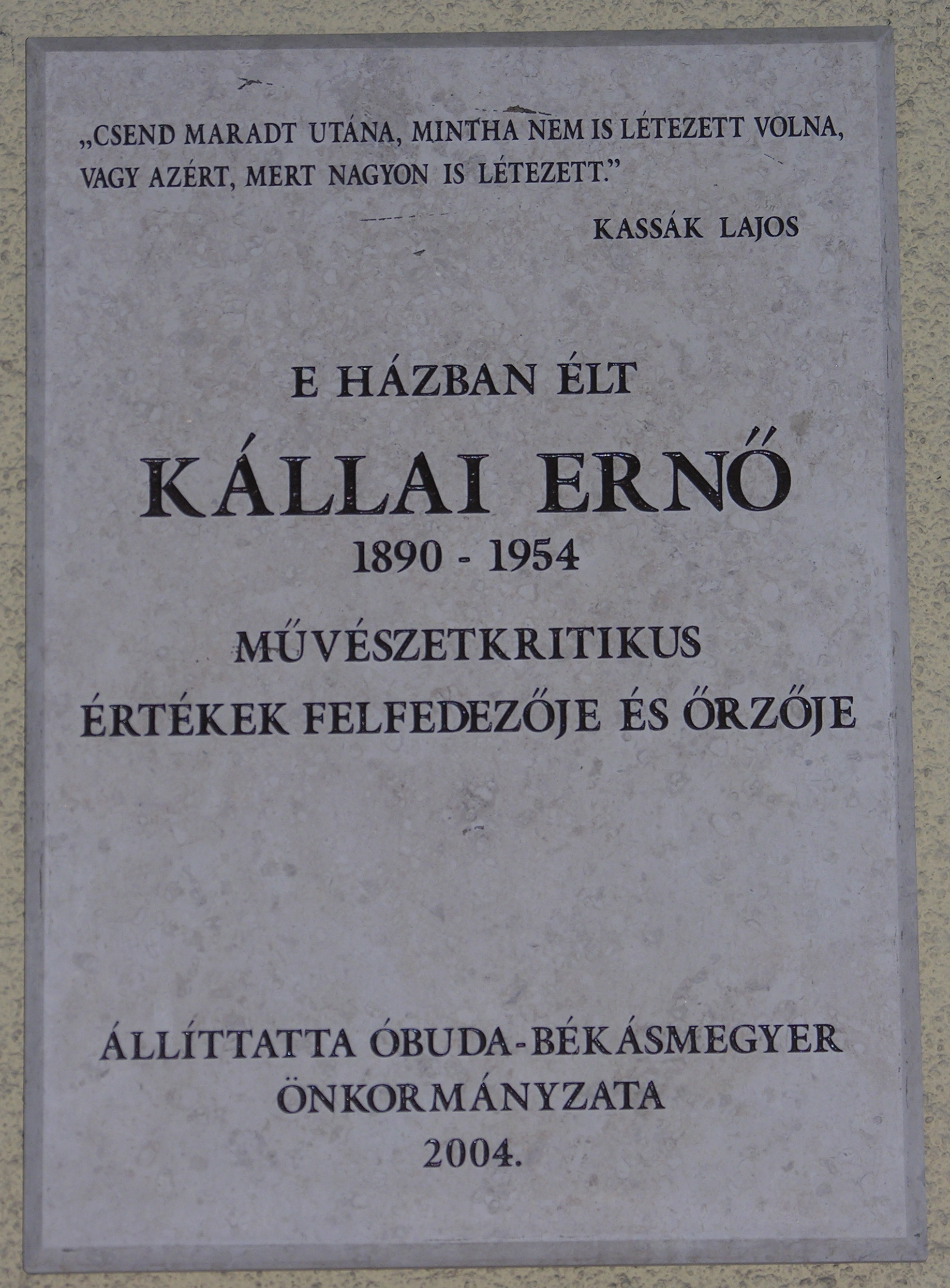
Commemorative plaque, erected at his former home, 76 Kiscelli Street, Budapest

Ernő Kállai (9 November 1890, Szakálháza – 28 November 1954, Budapest) was a Hungarian art critic who was involved in the promotion of and theorisation around Constructivism.

He encountered avant-garde art upon visiting the MA gallery of Lajos Kassák and soon contributed to MA under the pseudonym Péter Mátyás.

Following the suppression of the Hungarian Soviet Republic, Kállai went to Berlin but stayed in touch with other Hungarian refugees from the avant-garde art movement in Vienna.

In 1923 he wrote “The Russian Exhibition in Berlin” (Originally published as “A berlini orosz kiállítás”, Akasztott Ember vol. 2 (February 15, 1923)]

He also co-wrote a manifesto, “Nyilatkozat”, with Alfréd Kemény, László Moholy-Nagy and Laszlo Peri which appeared in Egység no. 4 (February 1923)]
