= Egység =

Hungarian art magazine from 1922 to 1924

Egység was a communist Hungarian art magazine published in Vienna and Berlin between 1922 and 1924. The full title was Egység, Irodalom, Müvészet which means "Unity, Literature, Art".

It was edited by Béla Uitz and Aladár Komját. They had previously been aligned with Lajos Kassák and his journal MA. Whereas Kassak advocated an ideologically autonomous artistic avantgarde, Egység advocated that artistic activity should be more closely aligned with other aspects of class struggle and was critical of a more individualistic approach.

The first issue was illustrated with a fresco plan Uitz's Emberiség (Humanity), a work commenced in 1919 but soon abandoned when the Hungarian Soviet Republic was crushed by the White Terror. As his accompanying text explained, this work was created according to the principles advocated by Georg Lukacs and Iván Hevesy, by which a future socialist culture should adapt the culture of the medieval period, whereby despite differing content, strong iconic forms could be used to instill a new world view. Uitz explained that the work illustrated a four part process of redemption, moving from man's origin, through suffering and labour to a final redemption. Love played a central role in this. However, Uitz indicated that he was aware of the limitations of his work.

In February 1923 Egység published a joint manifesto (Nyilatkozat) signed by Ernő Kállai, Alfréd Kemény, László Moholy-Nagy and Laszlo Peri. Kemény also contributed "Notes to the Russian Artists’ Exhibition in Berlin", (Originally published as “Jegyzetek az orosz mũvészek berlini kiállitáshoz,”), Egység (February, 1923).
