= Jolán Szilágyi =

Hungarian painter, graphic artist and cartoonist

Jolán Szilágyi (15 June 1895, Székelyudvarhely - 8 July 1971, Budapest), was a Hungarian painter, graphic artist and cartoonist.

She married Tibor Szamuely. During the Hungarian Soviet Republic Tibor was People's Commissar for Military Affairs and Jolán produced political posters, such as Minden gyárnak legyen munkászászlóalja! (Every factory should have a workers' battalion!). When the Republic was overthrown, she went into exile spending time in Italy, Germany and the Soviet Union, before returning to Hungary in 1948.

In 1921-1922 she was studying at VKhUTEMAS, the art and technical school founded in 1920 in Moscow. When Béla Uitz and Alfréd Kemény attended the 3rd Congress of the Communist International in Moscow, they met with Szilágyi who introduced them to El Lissitzky.
