= Aladár Komját =

Hungarian poet and communist activist

Aladár Komját (born Aladár Korach; 11 February 1891, Kassa – 3 January 1937, Paris) was a Hungarian poet and communist activist.

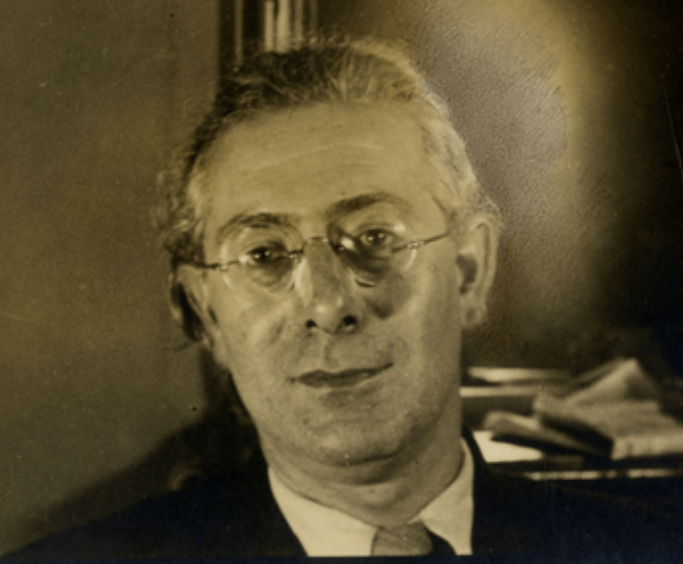
Aladár Komját

Komját broke with Lajos Kassák and the circle of artists around MA in 1917 and participated in the founding of the Communist Party of Hungary in 1918. In 1919 he worked with Gyula Hevesi to launch the first Hungarian communist journal, Internationálé. He joined Béla Uitz in editing Egység, a journal they launched in 1922 while in exile in Vienna.

In 1931 Komját was involved in debates amongst the German literary avant-garde allying himself with Karl Biro-Rosinger and Hans Marchwitza in advocating a more proletarian approach to writing which challenged the positions of Karl August Wittfogel.
