= Sándor Barta =

Hungarian poet (1897–1938)

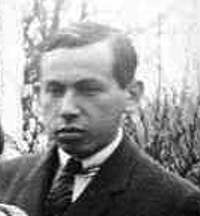
Sándor Barta in Vienna, 1922

Sándor Barta (born Sándor Blau; 7 October 1897 – 3 June 1938) was a Hungarian poet active in various avant-garde movements. After emigrating to the Soviet Union, he remained active amongst German-speaking cultural groups. He was an active agent in carrying out the Stalinist purges amongst the literary intelligentsia, but was himself arrested by the Soviet authorities and shot in 1938.

== Early life ==
His schooling stopped at secondary school and he went to work in his father's workshop. However he suffered from tuberculosis as a teenager. Then he got a job as a bookshop assistant and became involved with the Galileo Circle. He started writing poetry, and his first poem was published in MA. He married the poet Erzsi Újvári the sister of Lajos Kassák who edited MA.

== In Vienna ==
=== MA period ===
Barta wrote the manifesto "A zöldfejü ember" (The Green Headed Man) appeared in the January 1921 issue of MA in January. This indicates an interest in Dadaism, but Lassák was to later distance himself from Dadaism and Barta claiming that it was only published to appease Barta.

"A zöldfejü ember" p. 1

"A zöldfejü ember" p. 2

=== Akasztott Ember ===
Barta launched the journal Akasztott Ember ("Hanged Man") in November 1922. In 1923 it was renamed Ék ("Wedge"). He explained the title thus: "As people, we now feel ourselves to be hanged. And if someone doesn't feel hanged, he belongs among those who hang and kick us".
