= Stadium in Nové Zámky =

Ice rink in Nové Zámky, Slovakia

- Nickname: Zimak
- Interactive map of Stadium in Nové Zámky
- Coordinates: 47°59′21.41″N 18°10′55.02″E

Stadium in Nové Zámky is an ice rink in Nové Zámky, Slovakia.

The winter stadium lures not only home visitors and sports teams, but also foreign clubs. It is not odd, if the ice ring is available also during the summer. Every year ice hockey tournaments are organized on an international level. It is a modern all-round facility mostly for use during the winter, ideal for ice hockey and ice dancing team assemblies, organization of tournaments and contests.

== History ==
The beginnings of ice hockey in Nové Zámky were very hard, because the nearest man-made ice ring was in Nitra. The players had to travel to the ice rink. This status was until the year 1974, when the man-made ice ring was built in Nové Zámky. In that year TJ established a youth team. This team took part in the county tournament. To the end of the seventies teams of young and old students started to form. School sport centers were established. At the beginning of the eighties the ice ring started to be fitted with a roof and the object started to have the shape of a winter stadium. The whole object had been built during the "Z" plan, whereupon the railway men had endeavoured the most. They worked many brigade hours for free, so the ice hockey team bears the name Lokomotiva - locomotive.
