= Ladislav Pataki =

Czechoslovak sports scientist and athlete

Personal information
- Born: June 20, 1946 Nové Zámky, Czechoslovakia
- Died: April 5, 2007 (aged 60) San Jose, California, United States Spouse=Gisela Pataki (died 2003) Child= Neomi Pataki
- Years active: Junior: –1964; Masters: c. 1997 – c. 2003

Sport
- Sport: shot put, discus
- Team: Czechoslovak National Team

Achievements and titles
- Personal bests: Masters Track and Field; Outdoor Weight Pentathlon: 5366 points (Masters World Record July 12, 2001); Discus: 52.68 meters (1st place); Shot put: 15.85 meters (1st place) (Masters World Championship; Brisbane, Australia, July 6–12, 2001); Indoor Shot put: 16.04 meters (Masters World Record February 17, 1998; Silver State Indoor Masters Classic, Reno, Nevada)
- Updated on April 13, 2007

Ladislav Pataki (June 20, 1946 – April 5, 2007) was an American coach, sports scientist, and masters track and field thrower. He defected from Czechoslovakia in 1985 with his wife and daughter, settling in Los Gatos, California.

Dr. Pataki served as SyberVision System's Director of Advanced Sport Science upon his arrival in 1985 to 1990.

In this tenure he established and integrated the Stanford University/SyberVision-developed film-to-brain sport training technology into the USA Olympic elite athlete training program in Colorado Springs, CO.

After SyberVision he influenced the training of several world-class athletes living in the South Bay Area, where he continued his sports science career and developed nutritional supplements. As a masters competitor in track and field, he won several world championships and set world records in shot put and discus.

He had surgery for brain cancer in the Czech Republic in 2006, after declining chemotherapy. When the tumor could not be completely removed, he entered an assisted living residence in San Jose, California. He died at age 60.

== Early life and education ==
Pataki grew up in Nové Zámky, in the former Soviet-bloc state of Czechoslovakia. Nové Zámky is located in the Nitra Region in the southwest of modern Slovakia. According to his resumes, Pataki was the 1964 Czechoslovak Junior Champion and record holder in shot put. After competing in sports internationally as a youth, he earned two Doctorate of Research degrees from Comenius University in Bratislava, with a 1971 thesis in kinesiology and a 1977 thesis in sport science.

== Sports science career ==
After completing his first doctorate, he started his career in 1972 as head coach for discus throwing of the Czechoslovak National Team. He held progressively responsible positions in Czechoslovakia until his defection in 1985.

In the U.S., Pataki joined SyberVision Systems as its director of Advanced Sport Science.

He successfully introduced the Stanford University/SyberVision film-to-brain elite athlete training program into the USA Olympic training regimen at Colorado Springs, CO.

Dr. Pataki, the highest ranking sport scientist to defect from the Soviet Union, believed the SyberVision methodology (the ability to capture pure athletic skills on video and edit them in such a way that the viewer's body and "muscle memory" responded as if the viewer was physically performing the repetitive skill/action presented on the video) was more advanced and effective than the elite athlete training methodology used in the Soviet Union.

After SyberVision, in 1990 he continued his sports science career influencing the training of a group of world-class throwers who were competing in shot put, discus, and hammer throw. The concentration of strength-event athletes became known as "Weight City." (Nearby San Jose State University had been nicknamed Speed City during its period of track and field success in the 1960s.) He also began a business career developing marketing nutritional supplements.

In 2006, Pataki helped develop a nanotechnology-based skin care product at AmerElite Solutions, where he was the director of research and development.

== Masters competition ==
Pataki won world championships and set several records as a masters athletics (track and field) competitor in shot put, discus, and weight pentathlon.
