= Nové Zámky Roman Catholic Church =

Coordinates: 47.98577°N 18.1648°E

- Rimskokatolicky kostol NoveZamky
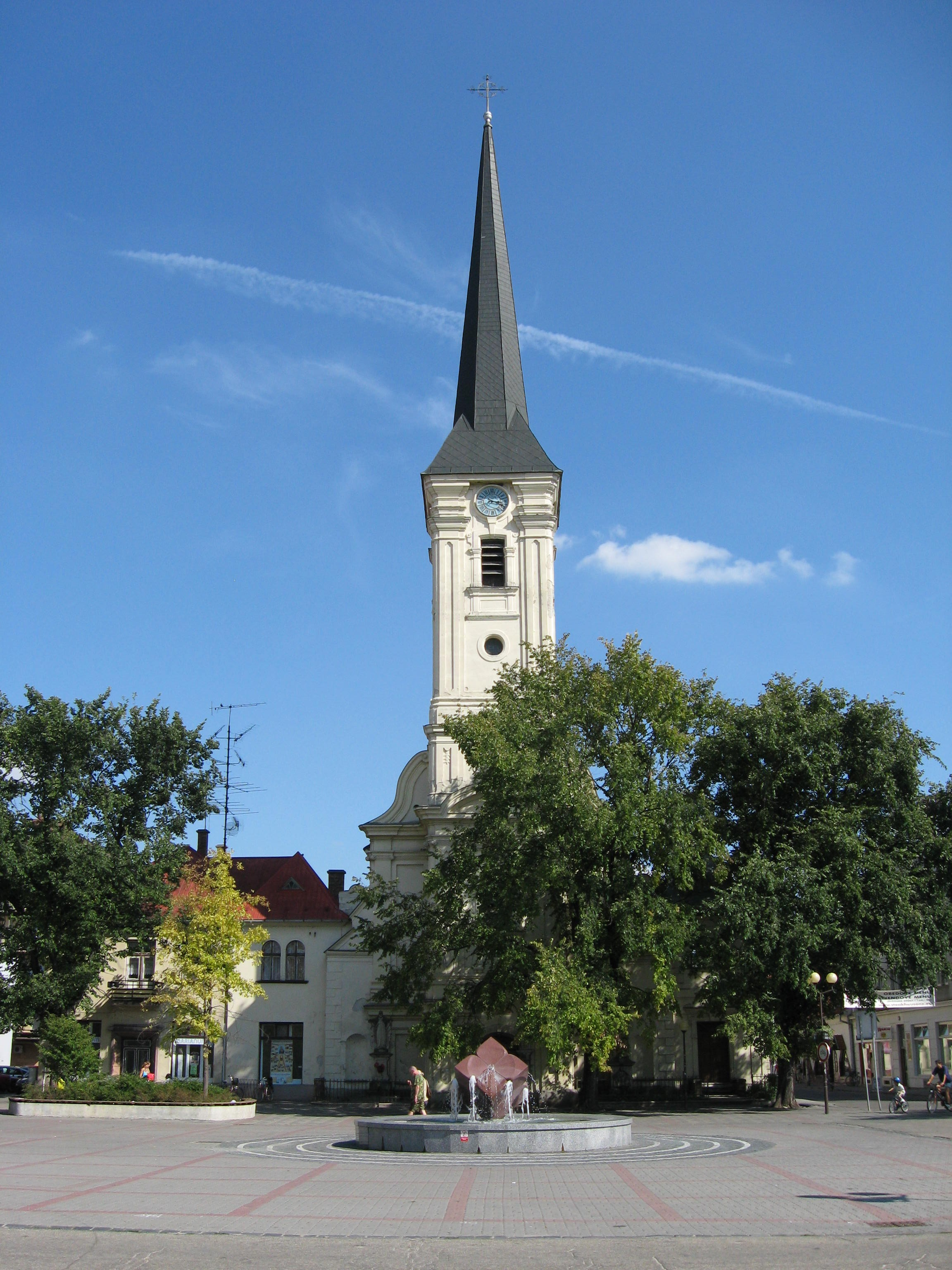
- Nové Zámky Roman Catholic Church
- Location: Nové Zámky
- Country: Slovakia

History
- Founded: 1585

The Roman Catholic Church of Nové Zámky (Slovak: Rimskokatolicky kostol NoveZamky) dominates the main square of the town, which is in south-west Slovakia.

A church at the site was built originally in 1584–1585. This was a simple late-Gothic building, and was later rebuilt several times. The building with all its facilities was totally destroyed by a fire. Only the sacristy remained, and an "eternal light" from the presbytery was saved. Until 1867, the church was decorated in a typical building in the late-Baroque classic style. The most recent major reconstruction work was undertaken in 1877, giving the church a neoclassic character. The round shape of the windows probably dates from this era.
