= Franciscan church and monastery, Nové Zámky =

Church in Slovakia

Franciscan church and monastery
- Františkánsky kostol a rímskokatolícky kláštor
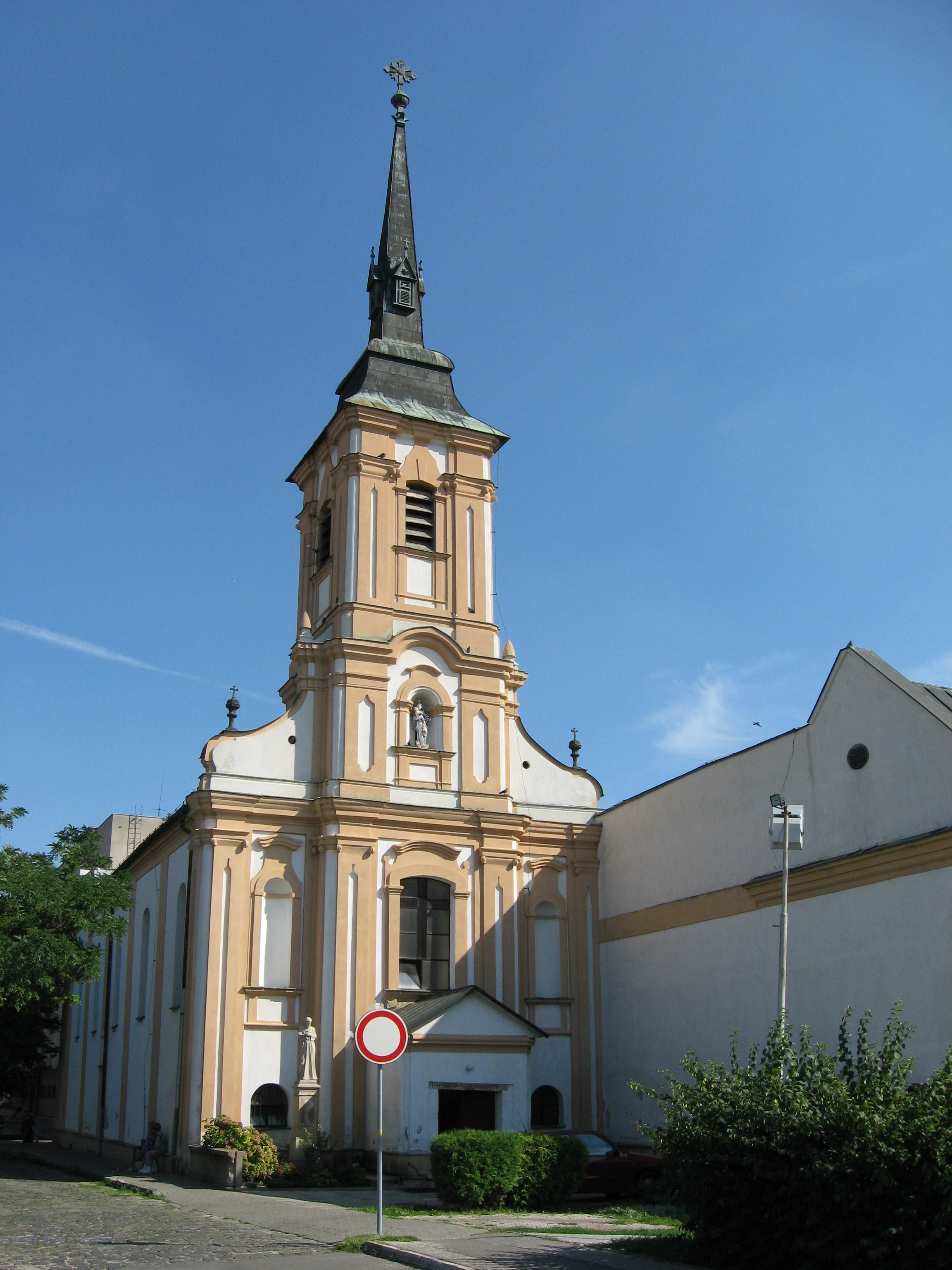
- Interactive map of Franciscan church and monastery

Monastery information
- Order: Franciscan
- Established: 24 May 1631
- Dedication: Saint Francis
- Diocese: Nitra

People
- Founder: Péter Pázmány

Architecture
- Heritage designation: Protected monument
- Groundbreaking: 1626
- Completion date: 1631, 1685, 1768

Site
- Location: Nové Zámky, Nitra Region, Slovakia
- Coordinates: 47°59′13″N 18°9′46″E

The Franciscan church and monastery (Slovak: Františkánsky kostol a rímskokatolícky kláštor) is a church in Nové Zámky, Nitra Region, Slovakia. It was built in 1626–1631.

== History ==
The first consecration of the church was done by Cardinal Peter Pazmáň on 24 May 1631. At first it was only a small church with shided roof and with a small monastery. At the beginning of 18th century the monastery was in the hands of Francis II Rákóczi and Miklós Bercsényi, who expanded the monastery partially. By the end of 19th century, according to the plans of K. Bálint the next renovation was done. The last complex reconstruction was done between 1978 and the end of the 20th century.

== Description ==
Pulpit

The wooden pulpit is part of the Baroque furniture of the church and it was probably made during the extensive reconstruction in 1766–68. It was certainly restored and repainted many times, and some of the more minute details of the decoration were lost or changed. The last restoration happened in 2004–05. The access is from the adjoining monastery through a short link corridor. On the balustrade of the pulpit four cherubs are perched with the symbols of the Evangelists, some of them holding a pen and a book. Another characteristic part of the decoration is an arm holding a cross. The abat-voix is decorated with a dove, the Tablets of Stone and a pelican symbolizing the sacrifice of Christ.

== Current use ==
Today the monastery serves as the location of the town museum and as a part of the accommodations for the spiritual order of Franciscan friars.

== See also ==
- Anton Bernolák's Chapel
