= Nové Zámky =

Town in Slovakia

Nové Zámky Érsekújvár
- Town
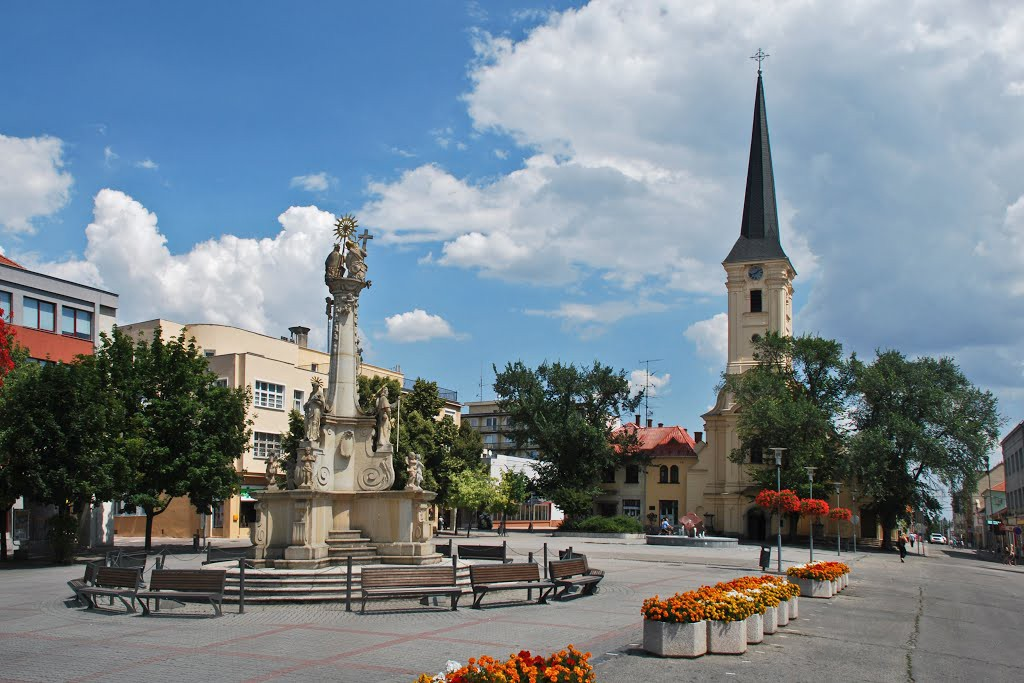
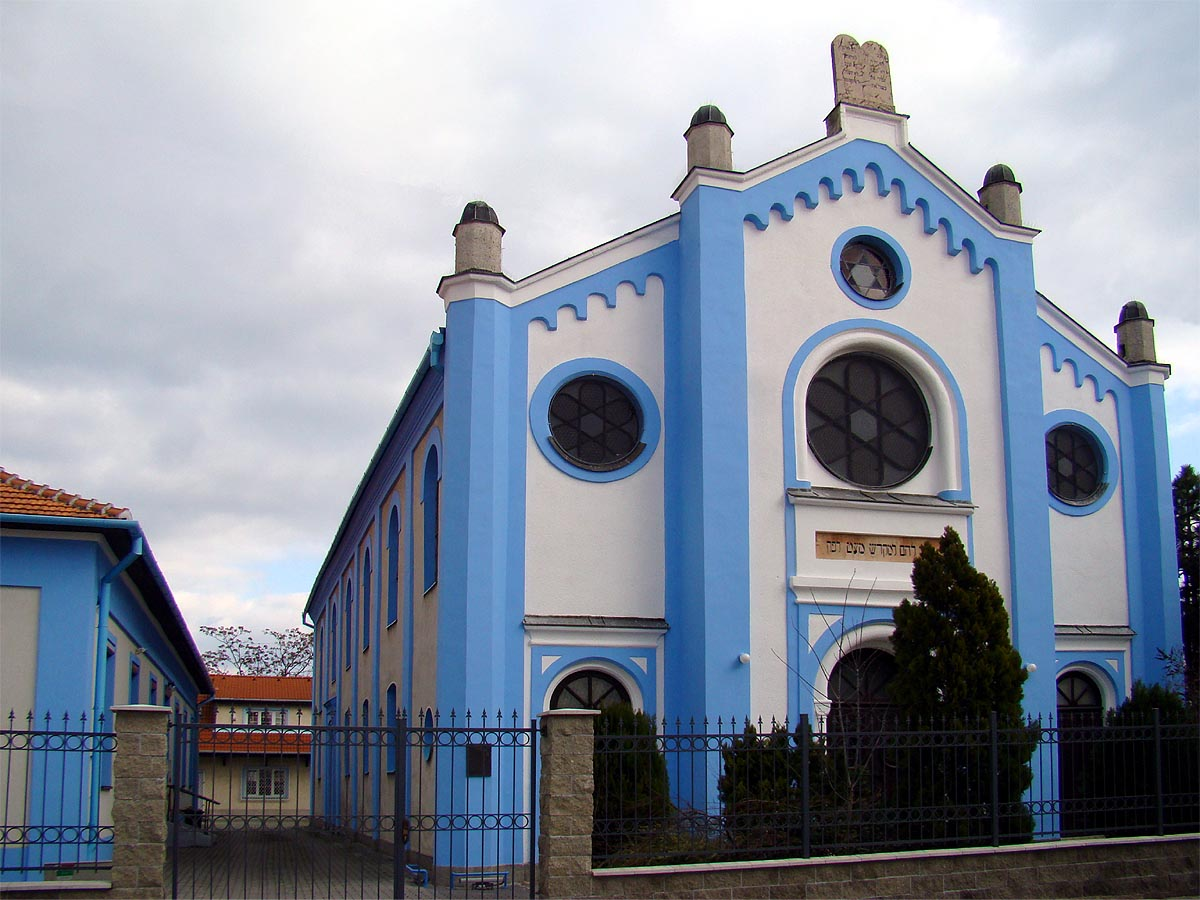
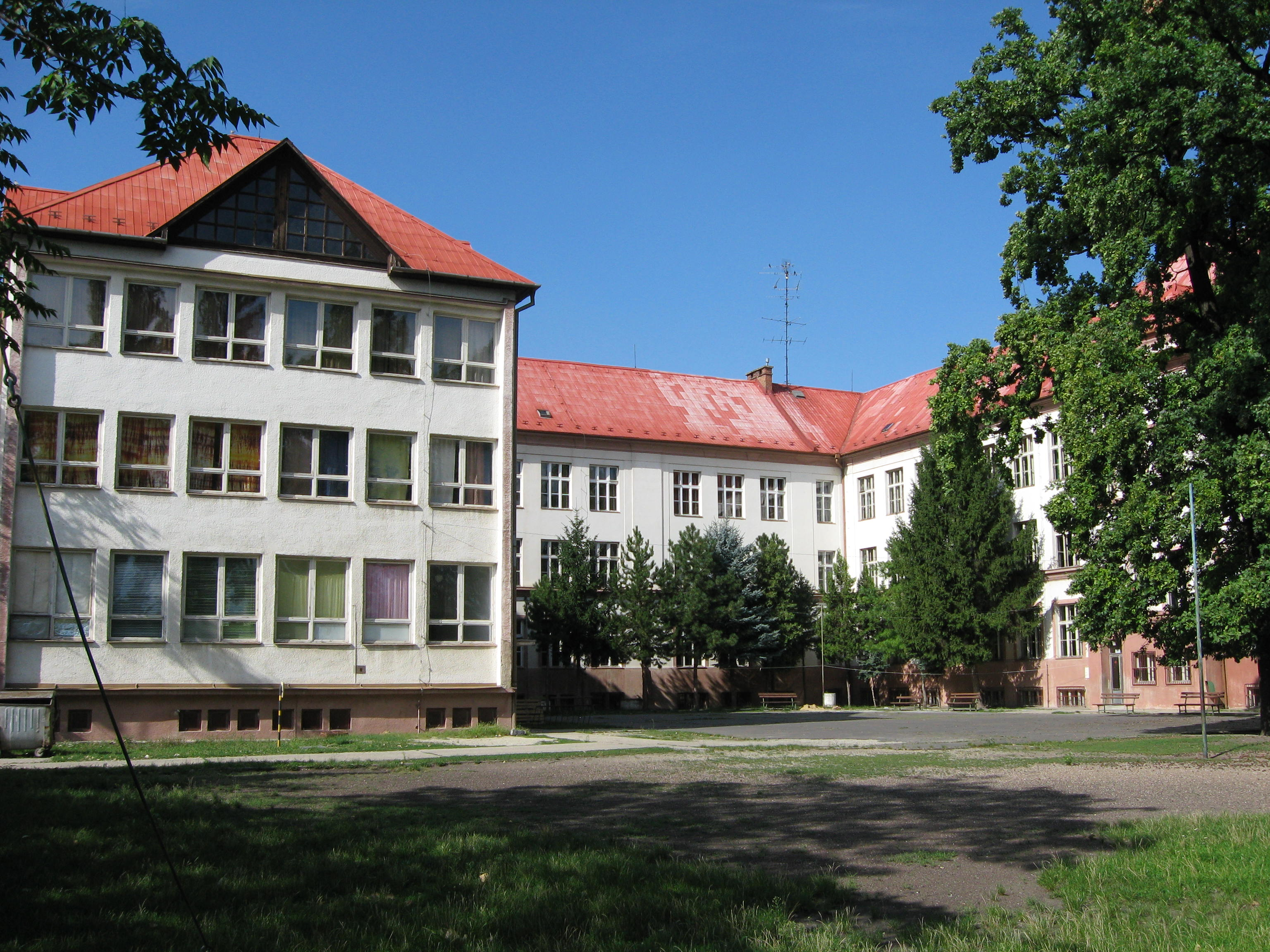
- From the top, Hlavné Námestie, Nové Zámky Synagogue, Czuczor Gergely's school Main square of Nové Zámky

- Flag Coat of arms

- Location in Slovakia Nové Zámky (Slovakia)
- Coordinates: 47°59′08″N 18°09′28″E
- Country: Slovakia
- Region: Nitra Region
- District: Nové Zámky
- Founded: 1573

Government
  - Mayor: Otokar Klein

Area
  - Total: 72.56 km^{2} (28.02 sq mi)
- (2022)
- Elevation: 114 m (374 ft)

Population (2025)
  - Total: 35,628
- Time zone: UTC+1 (CET)
  - Summer (DST): UTC+2 (CEST)
- Postal code: 940 01
- Area code: +421 35
- Vehicle registration plate (until 2022): NZ
- Website: www.novezamky.sk

Nové Zámky (Hungarian: Érsekújvár, German: Neuhäusel, Turkish: Uyvar, Latin: Novum Castrum) is a town in Nové Zámky District in the Nitra Region of southwestern Slovakia.

== Geography ==
The municipality lies at an altitude of 114 metres (374 ft) and covers an area of 72.56 km^{2} (28.02 sq mi) (2025).

The town is located on the Danubian Lowland, on the Nitra River, at an altitude of 119 metres. It is located around 100 km from Bratislava and around 25 km from the Hungarian border. It is a road and railway hub of southern Slovakia.

The town lies in the temperate zone and has a continental climate. Annual average temperature reaches around 10 °C (50.0 °F), with the warmest month being July with an average of 20 °C (68 °F) and the coldest January with −2 °C (28 °F). Average annual precipitation is 556 mm.

== History ==
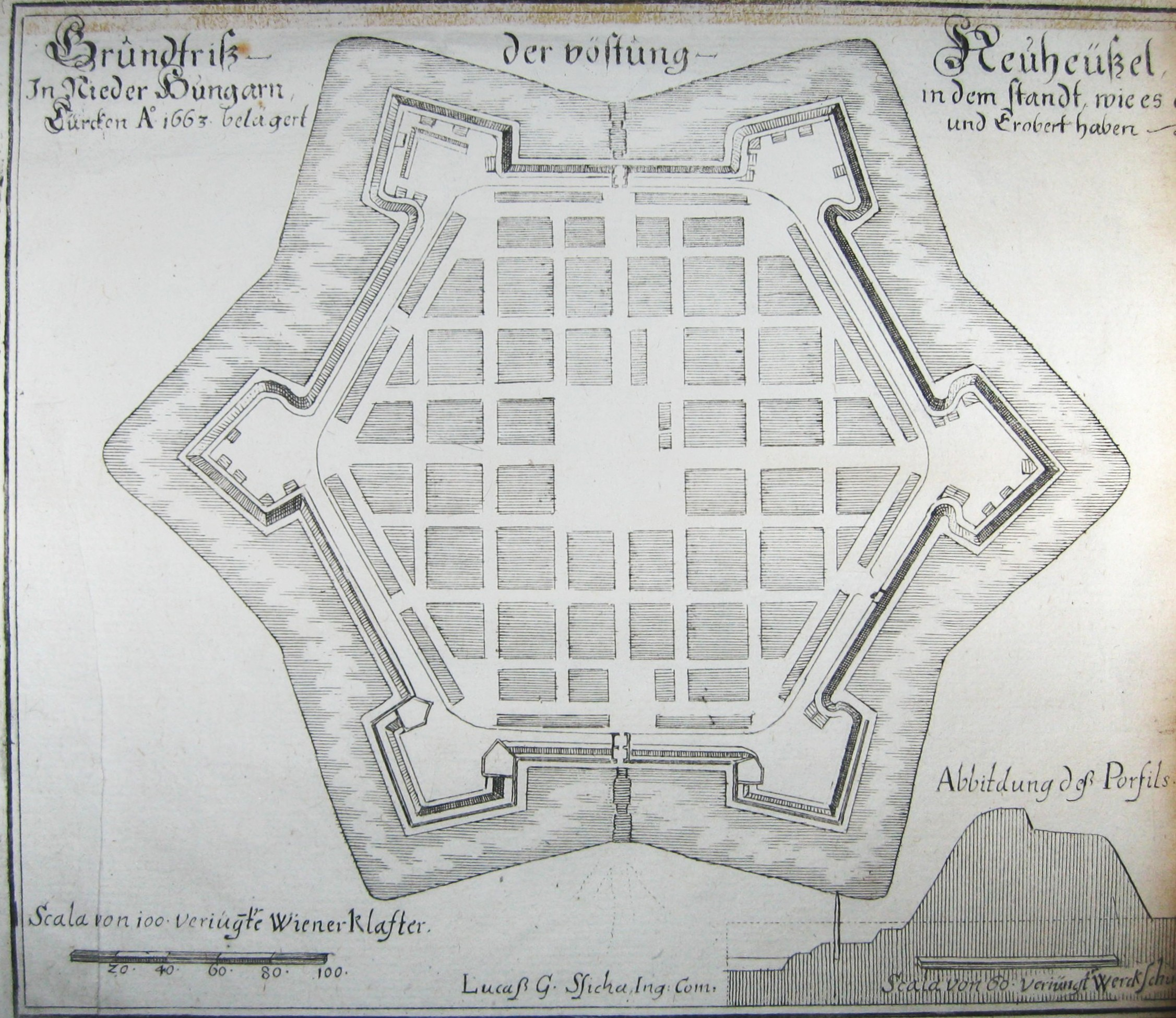
ca. 1680 plan of the "Neuhäusel Fortress as it was besieged and taken by the Ottomans in 1663”

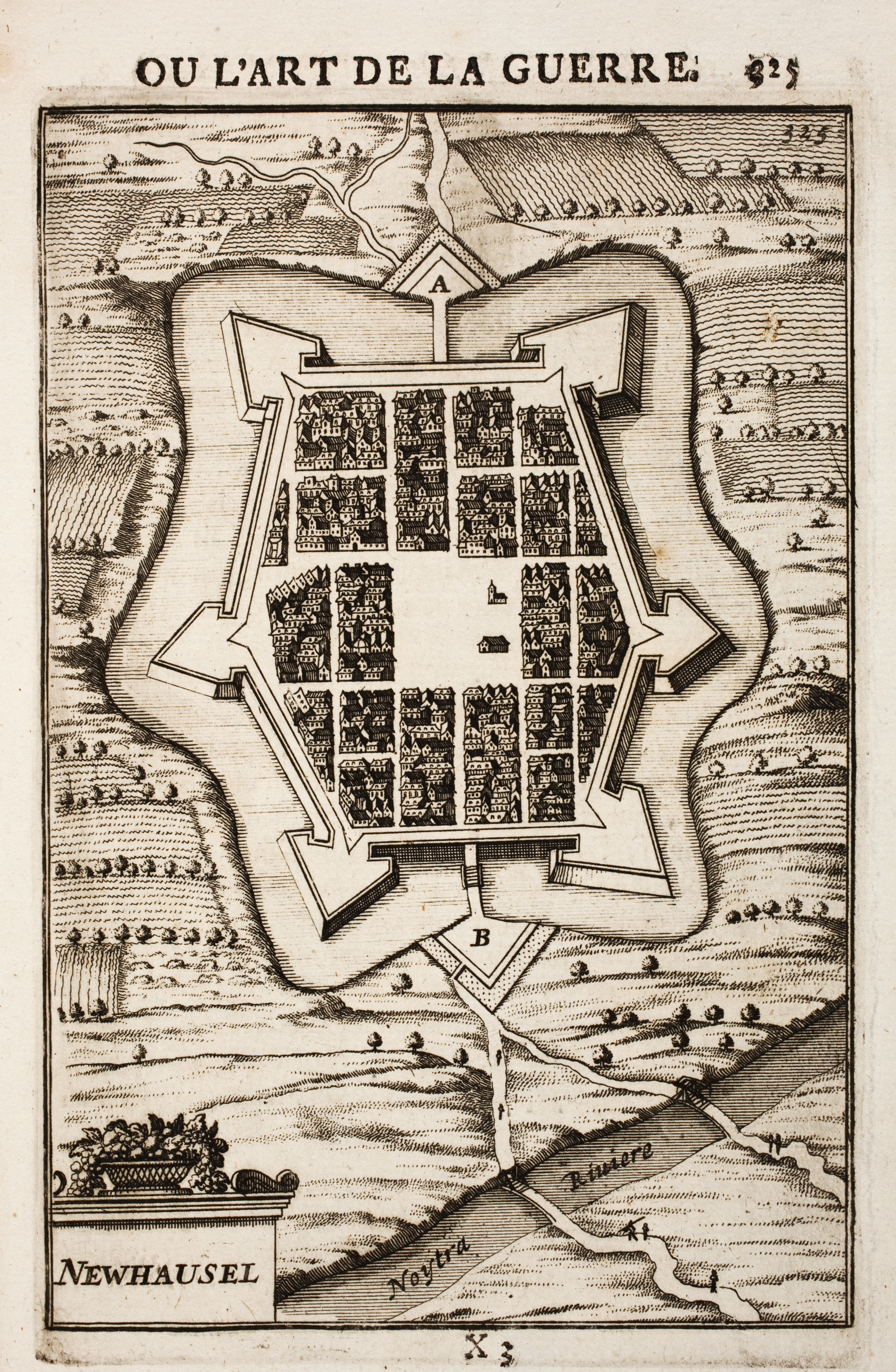
1696 plan of "Newhausel" on the "Noytra". Manesson: Art de la Guerre.

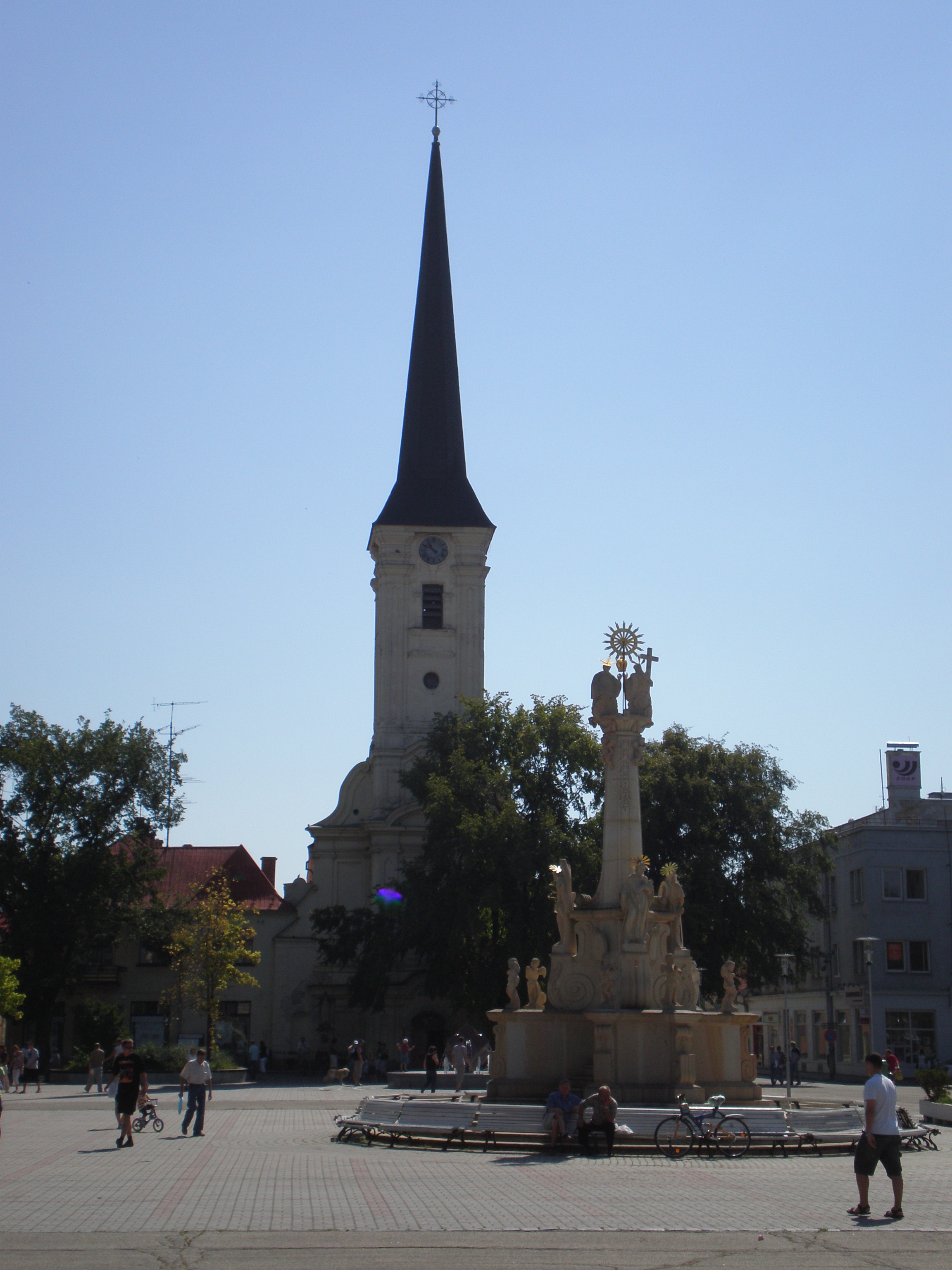
Nové Zámky Catholic Church.

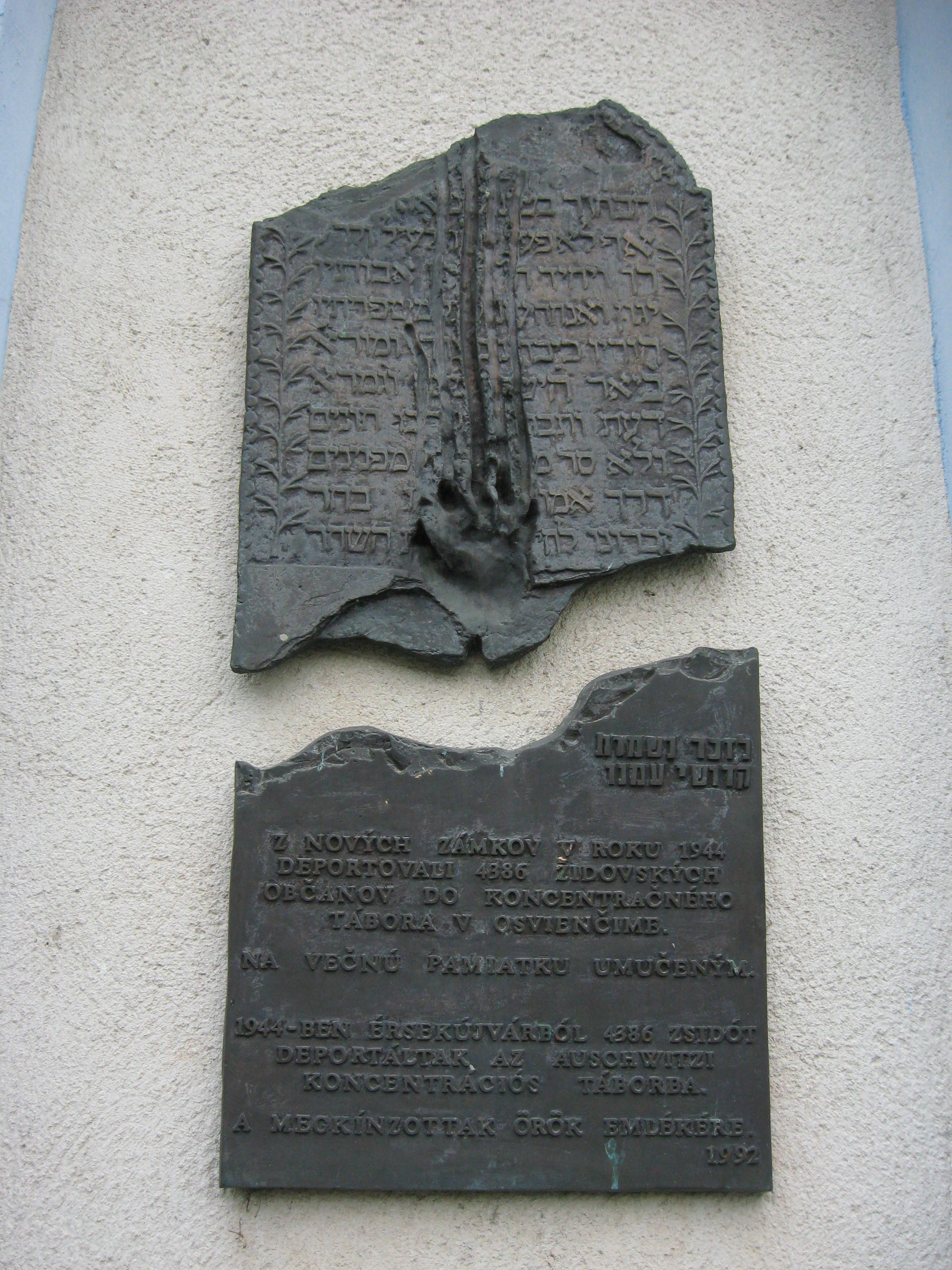
Memorial plaque of the Jews from Nové Zámky who died during World War II

The town has a distinguished history. From the second half of the 10th century until 1918, it was part of the Kingdom of Hungary. A fortress was built as a defence against the Ottoman Empire, on the site of an older settlement in the years 1573–81. Between 1589 and 1663, the settlement was the seat of the Captaincy of Lower Hungary. The town developed around the fortress. The huge new fortress was one of the most modern in Europe when it was built, a prime example of the star fortress which was considered to be adapted to the advance in artillery in the preceding centuries. (In fact, the Hungarian name means "the archbishop's new castle".)

The Ottomans failed to conquer it six times, but in 1663 they managed to do so. It was made the center of an Ottoman eyalet in present-day southern Slovakia – with the subordinate sanjaks of Litra, Leve, Novigrad, Holok, Bukabak and Şefradi (probably Šahy).

The saying "Strong as an Ottoman in front of Nové Zámky", which means working with determination and stability, reflects the memory of conquest determination of the Ottomans.

In 1685 it was conquered by the imperial troops of Charles V, Duke of Lorraine. Six years later, it received town privileges from the Esztergom archbishop.

The town also played an important role in many anti-Habsburg uprisings in the northern parts of Royal Hungary in the 17th century. Emperor Charles VI had it razed in 1724–1725, to prevent potential further insurrections which would use the fortress as their base.

After the break-up of Austria-Hungary in 1918/1920, the town became part of the newly created Czechoslovakia. As a result of the First Vienna Award, it was occupied by Hungary between 1938 and 1945.

After the Germans occupied Hungary in March 1944, the deportation of Hungarian Jewry to Auschwitz began. The town’s Jews were concentrated in a temporary ghetto. On June 12 and 15, 1944, two transports of Jews were sent to the Auschwitz concentration camp. The entire local Jewry was deported; few survived.

During World War II (1944), the town was heavily damaged by bombings of the Allies. Only small parts of the fortress are still standing today. It is, however, still depicted on the city's coat of arms.

== Culture ==
=== Museums ===
The Ernest Zmeták Art Gallery on Björnsonova Street has two permanent exhibitions. The first one, called "European Art of the 16th to 20th Century″, is based on the donation of a local painter and collector, Ernest Zmeták. The second one presents the works of art of a local Hungarian avant-garde artist and writer, Lajos Kassák.

=== Synagogue ===
The orthodox synagogue is located at Česká bašta and dates from 1880. After reconstruction in 1992 it was registered as a historic landmark of Slovakia. It is one of only four synagogues in Slovakia (in Bratislava, Košice, Bardejov and Nové Zámky) that are used for religious purposes by the local Jewish community.

=== Franciscan church and monastery ===
see Franciscan church and monastery, Nové Zámky

The Franciscan church and monastery was built in the early baroque style in the middle of the 17th century. The complex was renovated in the 18th and at the end of the 19th century.

== Population ==
Historical population
Year	Pop.	±%
1970	24,962	—
1980	34,147	+36.8%
1991	42,923	+25.7%
2001	42,262	−1.5%
2011	39,646	−6.2%
2021	37,791	−4.7%
Source: Censuses

Population statistic (10 years)
Year	1995	2005	2015	2025
Count	43,546	41,320	38,721	35,628
Difference		−5.11%	−6.28%	−7.98%

Population statistic
Year	2024	2025
Count	36,002	35,628
Difference		−1.03%

It has a population of 35,628 people (31 December 2025).

=== Ethnicity ===
Census 2021 (1+ %)
Ethnicity	Number	Fraction
Slovak	27,250	72.1%
Hungarian	9157	24.23%
Not found out	2786	7.37%
Total	37,791	

In year 2021 was 37,791 people by ethnicity 27,250 as Slovak, 9157 as Hungarian, 2786 as Not found out, 280 as Czech, 134 as Other, 72 as Romani, 52 as Ukrainian, 50 as Russian, 44 as Vietnamese, 33 as German, 29 as Chinese, 27 as Polish, 23 as Rusyn, 21 as Croatian, 20 as Jewish, 19 as English, 18 as Bulgarian, 10 as Serbian, 8 as Italian, 8 as Romanian, 8 as Albanian, 7 as Irish, 5 as Greek, 5 as French, 4 as Turkish, 4 as Austrian, 4 as Moravian, 2 as Silesian, 2 as Canadian and 1 as Iranian.

Note on population: The difference values of population numbers in the table "Population statistic" and in the sections "Ethnicity" & "Religion" is caused by the use of various statistical methods.

=== Religion ===
Census 2021 (1+ %)
Religion	Number	Fraction
Roman Catholic Church	19,368	51.25%
None	11,996	31.74%
Not found out	3636	9.62%
Evangelical Church	867	2.29%
Calvinist Church	729	1.93%
Total	37,791	

In year 2021 was 37,791 people by religion 19,368 from Roman Catholic Church, 11,996 from None, 3636 from Not found out, 867 from Evangelical Church, 729 from Calvinist Church, 181 from Greek Catholic Church, 145 from Christian Congregations in Slovakia, 142 from Jehovah's Witnesses, 124 from Ad hoc movements, 109 from Other, 94 from Apostolic Church, 87 from Baptists Church, 79 from Buddhism, 52 from Other and not ascertained christian church, 44 from Eastern Orthodox Church, 37 from Jewish community, 30 from Islam, 18 from United Methodist Church, 14 from Old Catholic Church, 13 from Paganism and natural spirituality, 11 from Seventh-day Adventist Church, 6 from Hinduism, 4 from Bahá'i Community, 2 from Church of Jesus Christ of Latter-day Saints, 1 from New Apostolic Church, 1 from Czechoslovak Hussite Church and 1 from Church of the Brethren.

=== Historical population ===
Year	Population	Year	Population
1694	1,200	1880	10,584
1713	1,525	1890	11,299
1731	2,970	1900	13,204
1755	3,873	1910	16,228
1779	4,671	1940	23,306
1787	5,167	1945	13,400
1811	5,493	1946	18,710
1821	5,957	1950	20,031
1830	6,904	1961	22,041
1851	6,936	1965	23,457
1857	7,622	1991	42,923
1869	9,483	2001	42,262

Ethnic comparison by year
	1700	1720	1890	1910	1930	1938	1991	2001	2011
Hungarian	61%	46%	71%	91.43%	45%	88%	31.10%	27.50%	
Slovak	25%	36%	8%	5.94%	42%	9.5%	66.82%	69.70%	
German	13%	17%	4%	2%	-	-	-	<0.1%	
Romani	-	-	3%	-	-	-	-	0.60%	
Jewish	-	-	13%	8.48%	8%	-	-	0.4%	

== Notable people ==
- Lucien Aigner – photographer
- Etienne Aigner – fashion designer
- Anton Bernolák – linguist
- Ayrton Cable – social activist
- Ferenc Helbing – graphic artist
- Mary Katherine Horony – noted Old West figure, partner of Dr. John H. "Doc" Holliday, present at the Gunfight at the O.K. Corral in Tombstone, Arizona
- Lajos Kassák – writer, critic, poet, publisher
- Ernest Klein - linguist, author, and rabbi
- Ľudovít Klein - mixed martial artist
- Samuel Klein - rabbi, historian, and historical geographer in Mandatory Palestine.
- Henrieta Nagyová – tennis player
- Peter Ölvecký – professional ice hockey player
- Ladislav Pataki – sports scientist, athletics coach, masters athletics champion
- György Pray – Jesuit Abbot, canon, librarian, historian
- Miriam Roth – Israeli pioneer of preschool education, author and scholar of children's literature
- Martina Suchá – tennis player
- Yaakov Weiss - member of the Irgun in Mandatory Palestine

== Twin towns – sister cities ==
Nové Zámky is twinned with:

- Fonyód, Hungary
- Sevnica, Slovenia
- Tábor, Czech Republic
- Znojmo, Czech Republic

== See also ==
- Nové Zámky Roman Catholic Church
- Stadium in Nové Zámky
