= Jolán Simon =

Hungarian actress

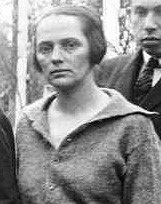
- Simon in 1922
- Born: 31 May 1885; Újpest, Austria-Hungary
- Died: 24 September 1938 (aged 53); Budapest, Hungary
- Occupation: Actor

Jolán Simon (31 May 1885 – 24 September 1938) was a Hungarian actor active in the Hungarian avant-garde during the early 20th century.

Her father died when she was still a child, so she was obliged to start work at an early age. She was largely self-taught but she did attend Kálmán Rózsahegyi's drama school.
