= MA (journal) =

Avant-garde Hungarian literature and arts magazine

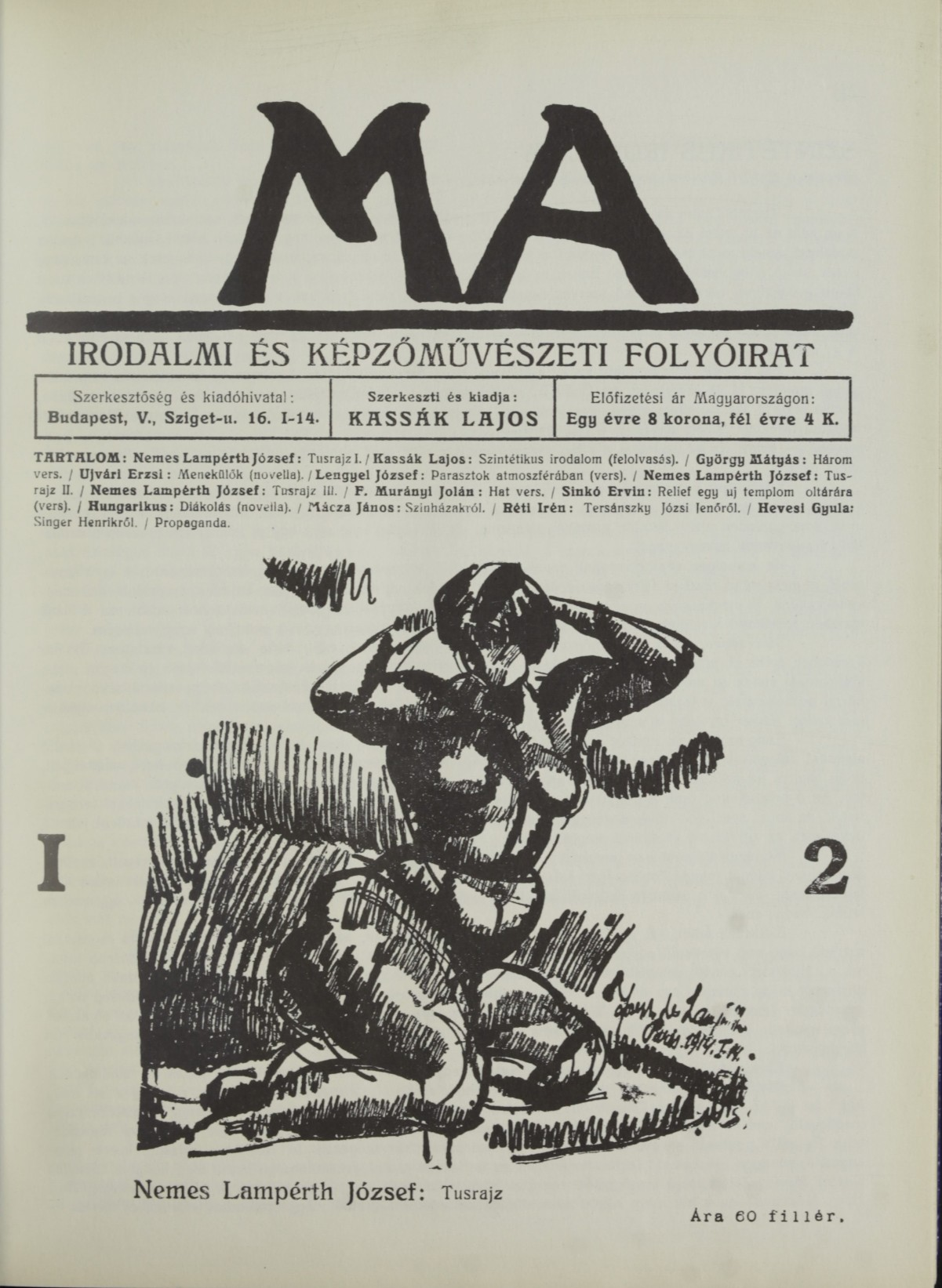
Cover illustration József Nemes-Lampérth

Ma was a Hungarian magazine connected with the Magyar Aktivizmus (Hungarian Activism) artistic group whose title not only reflects their initials but also means "today". It was founded in 1916 in Budapest by Lajos Kassák, who continued to publish it in exile in Vienna until 1925.

== History ==
=== Origins ===
MA was launched after a previous journal A Tett ("The Action") had been banned by the prosecutor's office in October 1916. The first issue was published the following month. From 1917 Béla Uitz joined the editorial team followed by Sándor Bortnyik, Jolán Simon, Sándor Barta and Erzsi Újvári.

=== Under the Hungarian Soviet Republic ===
Following the Aster Revolution, the MA activists were critical of Mihály Károlyi's government. They agitated for a communist revolution publishing special issues in support of revolutionary change. When the Hungarian Soviet Republic was established on 21 March 1919, at first it seemed that the MA group would play an important role in the new regime as Kassák and Uitz had positions in the directorates of literature and art. However, when they refused to subordinate their work to the control of the Party of Communists in Hungary, they were attacked by the Hungarian Social Democrats, which accused György Lukács, the Deputy Commissar for Public Education, of wasting money on their "incomprehensible" and "formalist" avant-garde art. Béla Kun also denounced the MA group as a product of "bourgeois decadence". Therefore, the art of MA was politically contested. In July 1919, the regime faced a chronic shortage in paper, and the MA (as well as other periodicals) was discontinued. Kassák left for Lake Balaton when MA was suspended. In August, following the fall of the Hungarian Soviet Republic, he was imprisoned, only being released in the winter thanks to the intervention of his partner, Jolán Simon. He then escaped to Vienna.

=== In Vienna ===
Kassák refounded the magazine in Vienna on May 1, 1920. He continued to publish it there until December 1, 1925. 33 issues were produced during this period. It was based Kassak's rented room in Hietzing, although he did a lot of editorial work in nearby cafés. The magazine generally contained articles written in Hungarian, yet Kassák was aiming at an international readership. His first programmatic text in exile was addressed to "all artists of the world". This increased level of interaction globally led Kassák to evolve his theoretical views, abandoning Expressionism in favour of Dadaism and Constructivism. Kassák wrote to the Zürich Dada Movement, and received a number of periodicals from Tristan Tzara.

On 20 November 1920 MA sponsored a "Russian Evening" featuring a slide show and lecture by Konstantin Umansky.

In 1926 Kassák returned to Budapest and founded the journal Dokumentum which he saw as a successor to MA. However it was discontinued after only five issues.

== Contributors ==
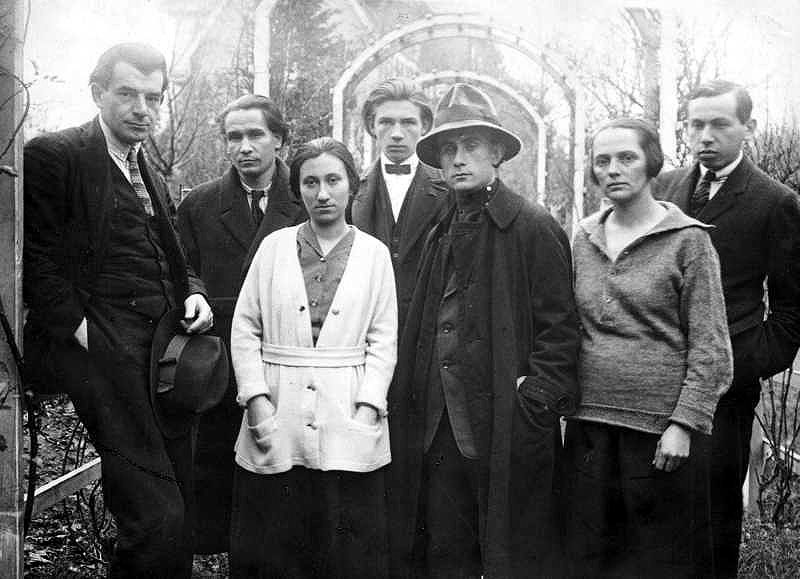
The editorial team of MA, Vienna 1922: Sándor Bortnyik, Béla Uitz, Erzsi Újvári, Andor Simon, Lajos Kassák, Jolán Simon, Sándor Barta

Contributors include:

=== Writers ===
- Hans Arp
- Sándor Barta
- Blaise Cendrars
- Jean Cocteau
- Alexic Dragan
- Claire Goll
- Vicente Huidobro
- Richard Huelsenbeck
- Ernő Kállai (under the pseudonym Péter Mátyás)
- Fernand Léger
- Franz Liebhard
- Ljubomir Micić
- Gorham Munson
- Nikolai Punin
- Hans Richter
- Andor Sugar

=== Artists ===
- Sándor Bortnyik
- Theo van Doesburg
- Petar Dobrović
- Albert Gleizes
- Lajos Gulácsy
- Raoul Hausmann
- Iván Hevesy
- Vilmos Huszár
- János Kmetty
- Jacques Lipchitz
- El Lissitzky
- János Mácza
- Hans Mattis-Teutsch
- László Moholy-Nagy
- Piet Mondrian
- Jószef Nemes-Lampérth
- Jacobus John Pieter Oud
- Francis Picabia
- Man Ray
- Oskar Schlemmer
- Vladimir Tatlin
- Béla Uitz
