= Iván Hevesy =

Hungarian art theorist

Iván Hevesy (Hungarian: [ˈivaːn ˈhɛvɛʃi]; 7 December 1893 – 29 January 1966) was a Hungarian literature, photography and film theorist. Hevesy is best known for his pioneering role in the history of the Hungarian avant-garde.
