= A Tett =

Radical Hungarian arts magazine

A Tett (The Action) was a Hungarian magazine published by Lajos Kassák from 1915 to 1916. It advocated an anarchist-pacifist outlook. Kassák sponsored several activities opposing the war – exhibitions of avant-garde art by socialist painters and lectures by left-leaning intellectuals. He also published work by foreign "enemy" artists and writers. It was modelled on Franz Pfemfert's German magazine Die Aktion. It presented a challenge to Nyugat, the established literary journal in the Kingdom of Hungary.

17 issues were produced, 12 with the same cover designed by Pál Pátzay.

Kassák published "Programm" in A Tett No.2 (March 1916). Here he advocated a "New literature" which should be "freed from all conventional 'ideological' and technical trends". He maintained it should be outside all "isms", an enemy of all wars and not geared to the interests of any race or nation. His final point was "The glorified ideal of the new literature is the Infinite Man!"

The magazine was the first magazine banned by the prosecutor's office in October 1916. They were accused of "undermining warfare objectives of the country".

Kassák replaced it by launching MA with a more cautious strap line, "journal of literature and art".
