= Alfréd Kemény =

Hungarian art theorist

Alfréd Kemény (1895, Újvidék, Kingdom of Hungary (today Novi Sad, Serbia) – August 1945, Budapest, Hungary) was a Hungarian artist and art critic.

== Notable works ==
- "Notes to the Russian Artists’ Exhibition in Berlin", ( “Jegyzetek az orosz mũvészek berlini kiállitáshoz,”), Egység (February, 1923)
- "Abstract Design from Suprematism to the Present", ("Die abstrakte Gestaltung vom Suprematismus bis heute" in Das Kunstblatt (No. 8, 1924)
