= Lajos Kassák =

Hungarian writer and artist

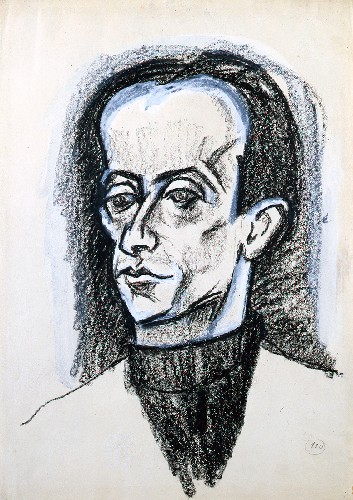
Portrait of Kassák by Lajos Tihanyi

Lajos Kassák (March 21, 1887 – July 22, 1967) was a Hungarian poet, novelist, painter, essayist, editor, theoretician of the avant-garde, and translator.

Self-taught, he became a writer within the socialist movement and published journals important to the radical intellectual culture of Budapest in the early 1900s. Although he cannot be fully identified with any single avant-garde movement, he adopted elements of expressionism, futurism and dadaism. He has been described as a well-acclaimed artistic virtuoso whose strong achievements and socially committed activities interlaced with a consistent artistic vibrancy. He set the pace for the development of the avant-garde artistic wing in Hungary. Kassák is also considered to be a pioneer of a number of new developments in the Hungarian avant-garde and modernist art scene.

It has been said that Kassák's legacy was stunted and unrecognized for a long while because his political and artistic activities were shrouded by the government of the Iron Curtain and by the activities of others. He started out not as an artist but as a locksmith and then moved on to become a political activist, writer, editor and painter. Kassák's artistic and political involvement actively started in the 1910s after he left off working as a locksmith. In 1920, due to the attack of the Hungarian government against intellectuals like Lajos Kassák which intensified following the collapse of the Republic of Councils in Hungary, he escaped into exile in Vienna. Paradoxically, this attack on Kassák's intellectual activism led to a flourishing literary lifestyle which included exhibitions, readings, culturally-spirited events and the journal editing enterprises that were soon to be transported back to Hungary where an underground trend of social campaigning was budding. After spending six years in exile, Kassák returned to Hungary and engaged in more literary activities including the founding of the Munka Circle and journal which lasted for almost ten years in a row and also stirred revivalism of a collectivised artistic avant-garde movement that were bonded by socio-politically oriented practices of artistry.

The government of the era strongly antagonised most of the movements and publications set up by Kassák upon his return to Hungary, but most of them managed to thrive in spite of this. For one, although the Munka group was banned, it only yielded to an eventual dissolution due to internal strife and conflicts. To say that Kassák was extremely anti-political would not be completely correct as Kassák, during his lifetime, acted as the chairman of the Arts Council during which time he edited a number of progressive journals like Alkotás and subsequently became a member of the Parliament of the Social Democratic Party in connection to which he edited a literary journal. His participation in these political spheres affected his reception and treatment as a writer after the journals were discontinued after the Communist regime was installed after the Second World War. For the second time, Kassák was forced to retire into a solitary form of habitation in his Bekásmegyer home. It was not until 1956 that Kassák's reputation as a writer became established although it can be said, at the time, there was yet to be holistic regard for his intellectual and artistic legacies.

Kassák mostly engaged in multimodality using different media forms that were both textual, aural, linguistic, spatial, and visual resources in order to articulate his socially-oriented messages. He wrote novels, painted extensively, supported the budding socio-photographic form of artistry in Hungary and worked with music in a defining way with his partner Jolán Simon heading a speaking choir which performed regularly at Munka Circle gatherings. Even more, Kassák delved into film production as well as dance. He is credited for integrating Russian artistry into the rather exclusive Hungarian art setting. The reception of Kassák's works has changed in contemporary times with several reprints of his books and an acknowledgement of other facets that makes him the artist that he was during his lifetime. In recognition of all his politically enthused and artistically significant efforts, Kassák was awarded a state medal on his 80th birthday in 1967. He died on July 22 of the same year and was a tributary honour by his colleagues, friends and supporters.

== Early life and education ==
Kassák was born in Érsekújvár, Austria-Hungary (present-day Nové Zámky, Slovakia). His father was an apothecary assistant and his mother a laundress. Although his parents wanted him to attend higher education, Kassák decided to quit his studies and started work as a locksmith assistant, gaining a letter of indenture as an apprentice. His sister was Erzsi Újvári who went on to marry Sándor Barta. After leaving grammar school in 1900, Kassák took part in an apprenticeship for four years and then moved to Budapest to work as a factory worker. As he worked in Angyalföld and Újpest, he participated in political struggles related to trade unions from 1904 to 1908. After partaking actively in the organization of strikes, rallies, protests and even joining the Hungarian Social Democratic Party, Kassák was fired from his job and totally blacklisted. Before then, one of his poems had already gotten published by the Weekly Újpest and he had gotten to meet Jolán Simon who would later be his wife. Through self-education on the prevalent sociopolitical anomalies of his time, Kassák became even more determined to engage in vibrant activism. Due to his hostile situation he found himself in, Kassák journeyed to Paris on foot and illicitly entered the country after getting ejected from Belgium and Germany. In Paris, Kassák found himself visiting several museums, writing leisurely and living the life of a wanderer. Upon coming back to Budapest in 1910, Kassák started participating in political-literary causes and also getting his poems and short stories published by newspaper houses, modernist literary press and socialist publications. From 1915, Kassák started to engage in the journal publication of A Tett by gathering together writers and artists of like-minded passion like him. These intellectuals moved from being mere commenters of the war to being critics with anti-war outlooks.

== Career ==
In 1904 Kassák moved to Budapest, where he worked in a factory on the outskirts of the city. He participated in the labour union movement and organized several strikes. In 1905 he was fired several times for organizing strikes.

In 1907 he left for Paris – on foot and without any money; the city was attracting artists and intellectuals from throughout eastern Europe. He was expelled to Hungary in 1910. The experiences of this journey were later covered in his autobiography entitled Egy ember élete (A Man's Life).

Despite his lack of formal education and inadequate writing skills, Kassák fought fiercely to publish his works. His first poem was published in 1908, and his first collections of short stories in 1912, titled Életsiratás. In 1915 he published his first collection of poems, Éposz Wagner maszkjában (Epic in the Mask of Wagner). That same year, he launched his first journal, entitled A Tett (The Action), which was soon censored and banned for being "pacifist". He was part of the intellectual movement that included the group of painters known as The Eight whose work he supported in his journals. He started Ma (Today) in Budapest and later published it from Vienna.

During the Hungarian Soviet Republic in 1919, he became a member of the special Writers Directorate. After fierce debates with the republic's leader, Béla Kun, he distanced himself from Bolshevism whilst always remaining a leftist. He never distinguished between being a socially responsible individual and an artist: his art was part of his self-definition as a "socialist man". György Lukács criticized Kassák for wanting to be the "official court poet of communism" yet simultaneously denying any affiliation to the communists during the onset of the White Terror. After the fall of the Hungarian Soviet Republic, Kassák emigrated to Vienna. There he continued publishing his second journal, MA ("Today" but also "Magyar Aktivizmus"= Hungarian Activism]). He also published an anthology, Buch neuer Künstler, a project in which László Moholy-Nagy was to help him by gathering material for him from Berlin.

However, in May 1922 Béla Uitz and Aladár Komját published the first issue of Egység, a rival journal, critical of Kassak.

In 1926, Kassák returned to Hungary. He continued editing and publishing journals such as Munka (Work) (1927–1938) and Dokumentum (Document) (1927), both of which were independent leftist avant-garde journals.

His autobiography, Egy ember élete (A Man's Life) was published in sections periodically in the Hungarian literary journal, Nyugat, between 1923 and 1937. After he published it as a book, he was prosecuted because of its chapters concerning the Hungarian Soviet Republic.

He regularly published in leftist newspapers. From 1945 to 1947, he edited the journal Kortárs (Contemporary), which closed when it was banned. In 1947 he returned to political duties, as the communists had taken over the Hungarian government. He was appointed as the head of the Social Democratic Party's Art Commission. In 1948 he became an MP. A year later he had to change seats in the Parliament, and later he had to resign, and finally retire because of the change of the political climate.

In 1953, Kassák criticised the Party's cultural politics and was expelled from the party. Because of this, he was not allowed to publish for years, until 1956, when he was elected to be a chair in the Writers Association, an influential organization of the era. From 1957 he became practically muted by the cultural censorship of the Party, and for the rest of his life was not allowed to travel, exhibit and publish. However, even in his silence, he influenced a large number of artist both in Hungary and internationally. He died in Budapest on July 22, 1967.

== Work ==
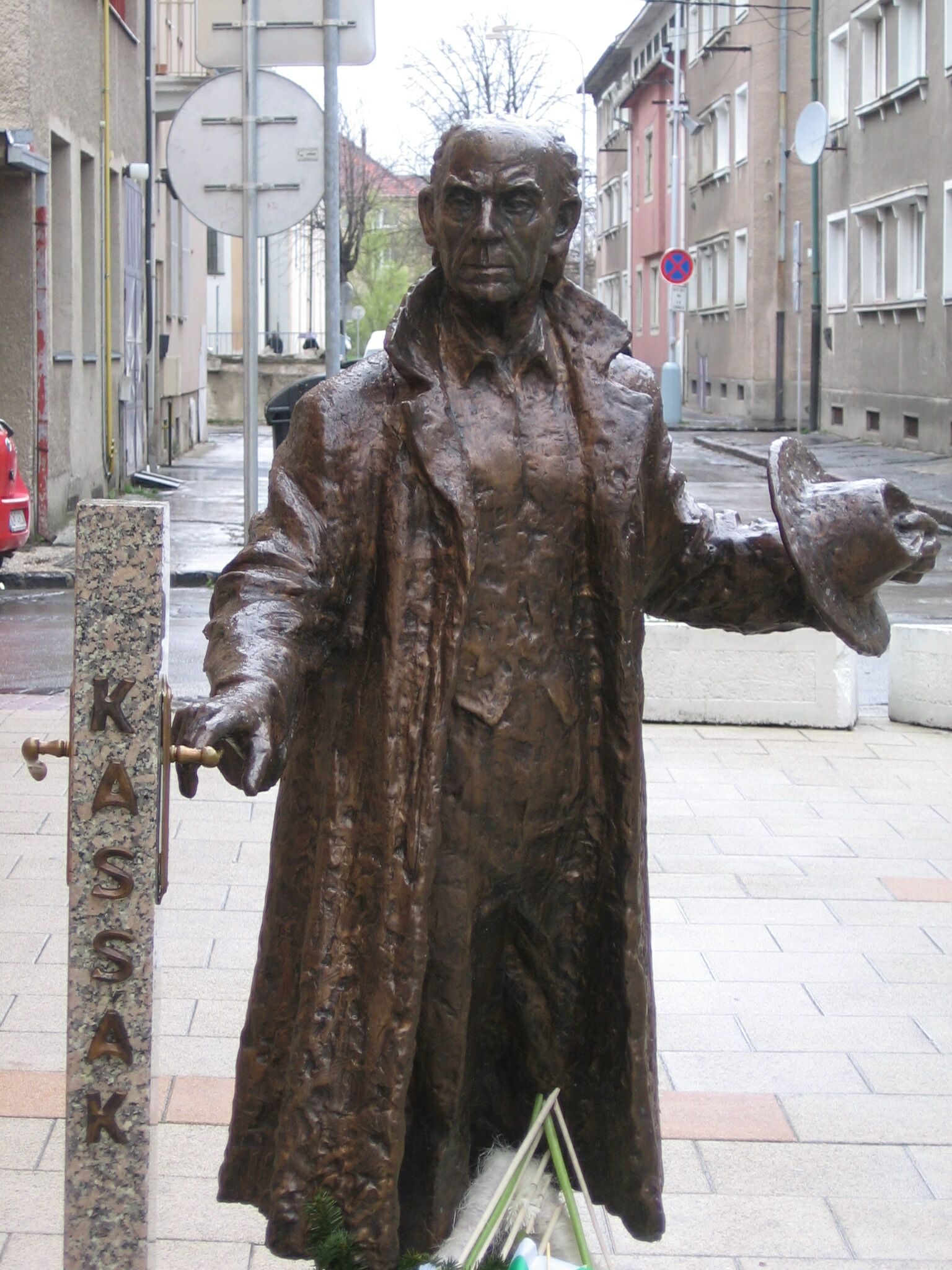
Statue of Lajos Kassák in Nové Zámky (Érsekújvár)

Kassák is considered to be the main father figure of literary Hungarian Avant-garde, and one of the first poet/writer/artists from a working-class background. His views on historical avant-garde movements influenced the region's perception and artistic production. His journals Ma ("Today") and the Tett ("The Deed") were widely followed. He was heavily influenced by the international constructivist movement and issued several manifestos: Képarchitektúra ("Image Architecture", 1922), Vissza a kaptafához ("Back to the Basics", 1923), and A konstruktivizmusról ("On Constructivism", 1922).

As he is associated with more than one style or movement, most art historians refer him as an "Activist", a special label issued to express the socially engaged style of his artistic production. Functionality and social effectivity were the main characteristics of his works, which have to be implemented by the modern being in order to create a world of social equality.

His works include concrete poetry, billboards, design, novels, and paintings, and were influenced by Expressionism, Dadaism, Futurism, Surrealism and Constructivist tendencies.

== A Tett ==
In November 1915 – 1916, during the First World War, Kassák started his first journal A Tett (The Action) which launched an artistically oriented backlash against the war-mongering political dealings in his time especially in Central and Eastern Europe. It is telling that the periodical A Tett was named in reference to a German anti-war journal whose title was Die Aktion. Kassák had always expressed antipathy for war through his poems published in newspapers; among others the periodical Új Nemzedék. So, for A Tett, he joined hands with artistic activists from countries in the heat of WWI whose aim was to attack the militarism going on in Hungary, France, Germany and the whole Europe at the time. As it has been often said, his viewpoints and projected ideologies about war and soldiery were anti-militarian and ambivalent; he was, in fact, an ‘anti-war intellectual’ and his antagonistic perspectives on war were best expressed within the pages of A Tett. Hence, the journal was considered as one bestowed with the mission of politically and artistically criticizing ‘war culture’, especially the accompanying character of enemy-camp stigmatization. The anti-war journal strongly accommodated the politically exuberant views of international writers and incorporated them into its journalistic culture not just as mere observers but as active participants to the dismay and anger of local critics. Some of the themes mostly explored in the supposedly literary and artistic journal including the criticism of pro-war ideologists and cultural events supporting war efforts, the demystification of supposed war heroes, a denouncement of the targeted antagonism against assumed enemies. A Tett also pointed a torch on the mutilation or killing of the human body, especially the maiming of men during the war, and the adverse effects this has on women, both psychologically and sexually. Although the journal was meant to engage in anti-militarism as opposed to the aestheticized presentations of war prevalent amongst intellectuals and the popular press of the time. The paper did survive for nearly a year but was cut short on October 2, 1916, by the government on account of certain articles in the second issue that were considered blasphemous and anti-war propaganda. The fact that, in the second issue of A Tett, several contributors and reproductions of artworks came from ‘enemy camps’ like Russia, Belgium, Britain, Germany etc. was considered an endangerment to the country's war efforts. Regardless, it has been argued that, for the time it existed, A Tett through its domestic and international operations constituted a signal to the world at a time when intervention of any sort was truly needed.

== MA in Budapest ==
This is the second journal that was begun by Kassák and his cohort of artistic activists. According to Kassák, the journal was specially founded to avoid the repressive control of the government by focusing on fine arts, music and other forms of artistry rather than just literature. The paper which means Today was channeled towards strong activism that was built around the forte of artistic and visual commentaries and channeled towards criticizing all manner of politically oriented anomalies especially the infringement on artistic freedom by the state in the 1910s. To embody this objective, the journal constantly underwent a lot of changes during the period of November 1916 to July 1919 within which time 35 issues were published before it was banned by the authorities; for one, it had a varied number of subtitles. From being a periodical of literature and arts, it became an activist periodical; then, it was tagged a periodical of activist art and society. The journal was even associated with theater houses and a popular publishing house, thus broadening its reach and giving it that much-wanted artistic outlook.

In fact, MA spread its tentacles to publishing important books and postcard series constituting the reproductions of principal Hungarian artists like Nemes-Lampérth József, Lajos Tihanyi and Kassák's own brother-in-law Béla Uitz. Additionally, through the body of personnel that were active in MA-related activities, literary and exhibitionary programs came to be organized customarily which served a culturally conciliatory purpose in light of the highly dispersed avant-garde population in several parts of Eastern Europe. In a sense, the MA circle became a movement in itself on whose platform several artists rose to prominence, one of which is János Mattis-Teutsch whose works have been on display in the Kassák Museum since early 2020. All the efforts poured into MA culminated into the recognition of Kassák as a remarkable exemplar of a European avant-gardist.

Despite the fact that the journal was presented as artistically oriented, MA was used as a touchstone to address specific political events of historic currency. There were open petitions for artistic independence and autonomy within the compass of the journal. Four special issues were published to reflect on the bourgeois-democratic revolution of 1918 and the subsequent eruption of the Communist Hungary Soviet Republic of 1919.

Also, right before getting banned, Kassák had a public confrontation with Béla Kun, the commissioner of the Hungarian commune. At the time, Kassák was a member of the Writer's Directory but he soon withdrew following his clash with Béla Kun. The polemics he rendered in this first public debate was published as one of the editions of MA under the title, “Letter to Béla Kun, in the Name of Art”. After the collapse of the Republic of Councils, to avoid counter-revolutionary backlash, and to escape an arrest warrant issued against him, Kassák emigrated to Vienna in 1920.

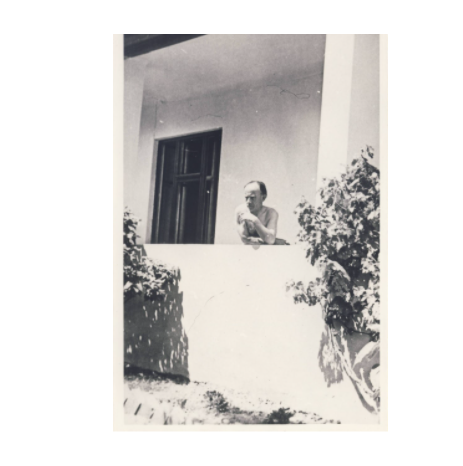
Kassák relaxing in a private apartment

=== MA in Vienna ===
During his time in Vienna, Kassák embarked on an evolutionary turn of MA, revitalized the journal in terms of design, content, human resources and imbued it with a new, revamped orientation which embraced the internationalist-bent aura that was dominating the era. Kassák's conscious fashioning of the journal as internationally inclined allowed him to feature a significant number of artists from other European countries and also collaborate with other international publications in terms of intellectual exchange, distribution and marketization.

In light of this, constructivism as a modern artistic outlook gained traction within the presentation of the new MA model, causing it to gain traction amongst many modern artists like Tristan Tzara, Kurt Schwitters, El Lissitzky and Hans Jean Arp, many of whom Kassák forged lasting relationships with. The new framework embodied by MA caused it to last longer than it did during its domestic presence in Hungary. The journal MA was an epoch-making Hungarian avant-garde publication that literalized revolutionary activism in 20th century Hungary. The journal's activities was only equaled by the Hungarian journal Nyugat which preceded it and other avant-garde journals like Zenit which shared similar creative aspirations with MA but was published in other Eastern European countries like Croatia and Serbia. After being all the rage for several years, the publication of MA waned and stopped altogether with Kassák's return to Hungary.

== Dokumentum in Budapest ==
Another journal which was founded by Kassák was the Dokumentum which was launched upon Kassák's return to Hungary in the autumn of 1926. Despite the short-lived nature of the journal, it really stood out and gained an international appeal. What really made this journal stand out was its multilingual nature. With Hungarian, French and German articles, it had the ambition to catch the global eye. However, the novelty of the avant-gardist approaches used in Dokumentum made it to be unpopular amongst many, causing it to fade out over the period of half a year.

== Munka ==
This journal founded by Kassák took a different shape from the previous journals set up by him. It had a more social outlook and was construed as an educative platform for the workers of the time whom Kassák made to share in his transformative vision of the political future as it should be. The journal Munka in itself means Work. Munka went from being the name of a socially conscious, proletarian-oriented journal to being a movement that attracted different workers and students into a Circle that fostered a bond amongst its members. The Kultúrstúdió (Cultural Studio) became a spatial space of activism and artistry all at once with several organized events simultaneously performing the functions of entertainment, the projection of experimental artistic works as well a conscious re-orientation of the political attitude of attendants and members which increased in numbers due to the status of Munka as an open group. Within this very embracing circle, there were several kinds of choirs from the speaking choir led by Kassák's partner Simon Jolán, a modern-music chamber chorus and a folk-song choir. There was also a painting group which mostly constituted students of the Academy of Fine Arts. Even more, there were usually organized rambling programs as well as summertime bathing organized at the beach, adventurous camping trips to sites in places like Horány close to Szentendre; most of the participants were workers of all kinds including civil servants, corporate workers, craftsmen and sole proprietors. Given how the journal (a derivative of the movement) constructed itself around cultural and socially relevant issues affecting Hungary at the time and was deliberately made affordable, it gained immense popularity and increased in leaps and bounds so much that it lasted between the years 1928 to 1939 until it faced opposition and became subject to censorship from the government. It was eventually dissolved following a hostile Interior Ministry decree and unavoidable tension which surfaced within the group itself. Apart from his involvement in his own thriving projects, Kassák was also invested in using the medium of other papers and journals like Népszava and Szocializmus.

== As a writer ==
Kassák was successful as a writer, with several decades of productive writing, publishing and literary acclaim. One of his most defining literary outputs is his autobiographical work titled Life of a Man, which he started writing when he was 36 years old. Kassák wrote several poems of avant-garde texture and also novels. His socially conscious novels helped propagate the purpose of the movement.

In his early years during the period of exile and isolation, Kassák experimented with his poetic style, writing poems that were free versed and reflective of thematic multiplicity. During his later years, Kassák wrote and published a spectacular array of poems that poeticized his personal struggles and reflected on his immediate environments, his past life and psychological introspections. In addition to his fictional works, Kassák wrote several politically engaged articles, denouncing any act of political or even racial injustice such as the articles he published against the “ordinances of the third anti-Semitic law” made during the Second World War. Given his literary achievements, Kassák took up vital positions in several literary-oriented publications. After WWII, he was the editor of Új Idők (New Times) as well the vice-chairman of the Arts Council, a parastatal which operated under the body of the Ministry of Religion and Education. During this time, he edited the periodical Alkotás and also was the editor of a periodical named Kortárs during his time as a member of the Hungarian Social Democratic Party. Even more, he was a key leader in the Journalists Association, the Hungarian Writers’ Association as well as the co-president of the PEN Club. In 1948, Alkotás and Kortárs stopped because of the increasing political oppression and Kassák was marginalized within the Hungarian Writer's Association in 1953 after he clashed with its members over the cultural policies of the Hungarian Democratic Party.

This made it difficult for him to find publishers and his creative works were stifled for a very long time. He was, however, able to continue publishing and trade his later poems and paintings on international platforms like galleries and museums in Paris, Vienna, Israel as well as Locarno and Zurich museums in Switzerland. Despite the state-orchestrated inhibition of his works, Kassák was nationally acknowledged more as a writer and poet in Hungary and was, in 1965, even given the Kossuth Award in recognition of his poetry.

== As a visual artist ==
During his young days, Kassák was rarely recognized as an avant-garde artist even though he was well appraised and honoured as a writer. It was not until his last years during the international recognition of the merit of Eastern European avant-garde art that Kassák's artistic works began to be exhibited in Western European spaces and some of his pieces even gained traction amongst the artistic audience in those territories. Although most people know Kassák as a literary virtuoso whose involvement in founding several social and critically enthused journals gained the attention of the public, he is also a painter with some interesting artworks to his credit/name. Kassák's visual explorations were born out of the need to communicate his message(s) through whatever available means of communication there is; knowing that the visual language is advantaged in its own right to publicize socially-conscious themes, he exploratively delved into the visual art in all its ramifications. He took to the constructivist aesthetics; painting geometry into meaning and carving a manifesto out of lines and shapes made from colours. One of the artworks for which he came to be known is titled Dynamic Construction which was created between 1922 and 1924. Aside from constructivist painting, Kassák was very immersed in photographic works, especially the socially conscious brand of photography and it was with this help that a monumental socio photographic exhibition was held which was then followed by a published book titled From Our Lives. His interest in photography launched him into creating photomontages in which he collages several pictures drawn from a theme to visually aestheticize the sociocultural causes that were paramountly upheld by workers in the Munka Circle.

Kassák pioneered distinct trends of artistic productions which are transmedia in nature. For one, he was known for his image-poems which he wrote within the period of 1920–1929. Not only did Kassák design the cover pages of his numerous books, but he also worked hand in hand with other contributors to design and produce the artworks on the cover pages of his edited journals most of which were carefully created to reflect the mood of the issues. He and other contributors painstakingly designed these cover pages in a way that projected the theme of the issue or volume and this is a noteworthy undertaking that enunciates the distinctive quality of intricately aligning words and images in an interdependent fashion.

Apart from actively engaging in painting, he also formed theoretical concepts about contemporary art and constructivism. The core around which constructivism was built was that the painting of shapes and colours should create a “constructed space”. To achieve this, dynamism (the forces of action and motion) and pull against gravity are taken into account during the process of creating art. Due to this contribution in constructivist theories in his time, Kassák declared himself a theoretician, participating in discourses about international and domestic contemporary art. He quite much lives up to this title as he experiments theoretically and practically with transferring constructivist patterns and blueprints from material objects like glass to images and developing by himself illustrative prints with linocuts (a concept also practised by László Moholy-Nagy which he included in his book on image architecture. To publicly communicate his constructivist vision, Kassák published a shorter German version of a longer manifesto in the 1922 Volume 1 edition of the MA journal under the title ‘Bildarchitectur’. His involvement in contemporary art movements caused him to be a figure to be reckoned with even during his time.

=== Involvement in Dadaism ===
Even in his literary activities, Kassák was very influenced by the Dadaist tradition. The journal MA founded by Kassák was said to “exhibit Dadaist features… which gives it great strength and an affirmative power... [and helped] in the establishing of a new atmosphere.” Between the years 1920 and 1929, Kassák wrote a collection of numerated poems numbered 100, most of which, like Poem 8 and Poem 32, were considered to be infused with a “graphic display of letters and lines” as well as a “free play with words’ and an absurdist quality. It was even said that, at a later age, Kassák's avant-garde activism began to metamorphose into a distinctive sort of Dadaism.

=== Képarchitektúra ===
Képarchitektúra, or Image Architecture was first defined in pamphlet by Kassák in late 1921. The manifesto was reprinted in MA 7, no. 4 (March 1922), pp. 52–54.

== Kassák and Hungarian avantgardism ==
Although integrated into the collective notion of national culture, avantgardism developed as an independent assertion of politically enthused artistic expression in the heat of internationalism which was bolstered by the surge of modernism during the 20th century. Within the sphere of the highly significant, internationalist-bent artistic setting, Kassák proves to be quite a memorable figure whose vibrant participation in the avant-garde practice has stirred considerable attention in recent times. In fact, the Hungarian avant-garde scene was mostly centred around him; he was regarded by writer Bosko Tokin as “the strongest expression of the movement [as his] poetry carried the stamp of a revolutionary experience and of hope in the human race, in the ideal of the human community.” Apart from his poetry, Kassák's avant-garde participation was foregrounded by his founding of the “main Hungarian activist journal Ma [which] spanned several years and was very productive.” In essence, it is considered a matter of fact that the historical trajectory of the Hungarian avant-garde and its visual artistic developments is tied to “the four avant-garde journals edited by Kassák between 1915 and 1927 – A Tett (The Action), Ma (Today), 2×2, Dokumentum (Document).” The significance of these journals in shaping Hungarian avant-gardism is embodied by how they served as mediums for researching on, presenting, interpreting and debating on the issues of the time through a theoretical model of presentation called Periodical Studies, a distinct approach to research writing, visuals, and editing. In an appraisal of Kassák's role as the “heart and soul” of the avant-garde movement in Hungary, the activities which qualified him as thus were put forward. He was considered “a poet, novelist, painter, author of image-poems of unusual intensity and decisiveness. His thought is always modern. His spirit, thoughts, impulsiveness and style possess the unusually daring “tournures” (contours).

What is more, Kassák collaborated with other writers and artists in Europe to create a synergy of avant-garde engagements that revolved several facets of art – poetry, literary criticism, painting, music etc. Just like in the countries of former Yugoslav and other ex-Socialist states, avantgardism was tied to individual cultural efforts rather than nationalistic trends. Amidst the swell of individualized artistic productions, the avantgardism practised by Kassák and others was clearly defined by a strong urge to “find [humanistic], adequate means of expressing one’s inner world.”

== Personal life ==
=== Simon Jolan ===
Kassak's first wife is rarely talked about or given attention in her own right but she is equally as important as Kassak as she contributed immensely to his success both as an artist and political activist. Married once at the age of 17 to János Pál Nagy, a carpenter's assistant, for whom she bore three children, Jolan met Kassak after leaving this marriage during an event organised by the Ujpest Worker's Home. At the time, she was working as a worker at the United Bulb, an Austro-Hungarian electrical company. She later went on to attend acting school and take up acting as a professional career. Simon Jolan was a strong pillar of support for Kassak during the time he was still unrecognised as a writer and artist; she supported his writings, publications even while working as an actress. She emigrated with him to Vienna in 1920 and helped administratively with his publishing of A Tett and MA. Upon returning to Budapest from Vienna with Kassak, she spearheaded the speaking choir which frequently performed during the meetings of the members of the Munka (Work Cycle) movement. Other closely related people who contributed to his success as an avant-garde artist, a sociopolitical activist and editor of several journals include his sister and brother-in-law. She committed suicide on September 24, 1938, and as a tribute, Kassak wrote the poem Requiem to a Woman 25 years after her death. In 1940, Kassak met and got involved with Klára Kárpáti whom he later married.

== Legacy ==
- The Lajos Kassák Museum, in Óbuda, northern Budapest, is located near his last residence and has some 20,000 items related to his life and work.

== Quotations ==
- "The father of every good work is discontent, and its mother is diligence."
