= Lajos Szabó =

Hungarian philosopher

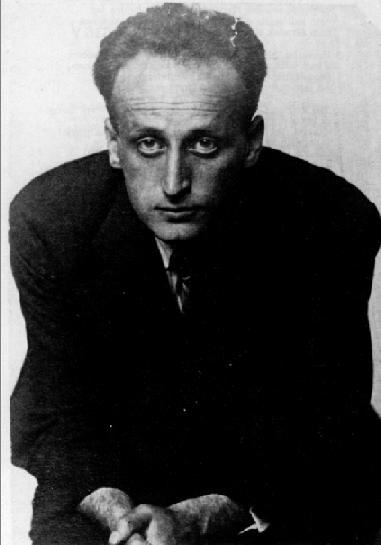
Lajos Szabó

Lajos Szabó (1 July 1902 in Budapest – 21 October 1967 in Düsseldorf) was a Hungarian philosopher and one of the founders of the Budapest Dialogical School.

== Early life ==
Lajos Szabó was born in Budapest on July 1, 1902. In 1919, he was dismissed from vocational secondary school due to his sympathies with the Hungarian Soviet Republic. At the beginning of the 1920s, he participated in the illegal Communist movement for a few months, before his politics shifted.

== Personal life ==
In 1938, Szabó married Magda Pallós, who died in 1946. In 1940, he was called up for labour service, but was dismissed a few weeks later from the army due to his tuberculosis. He was hospitalised at the New St John's Hospital in Budakeszi. His close friend Lajos Vajda was treated at the same hospital ward. In the spring of 1944, Szabó was deported to Auschwitz. He survived and returned home to Hungary at the end of 1945.

Lajos Szabó died on October 21, 1967 in Düsseldorf. He is buried in the Jewish cemetery.

== A Self-Taught Philosopher ==
In the first half of the 1920s, Lajos Szabó worked in Vienna and Budapest as a bookshop assistant. Between 1928 and 1930 he became a member of the "work circle" of Lajos Kassák. This was the Munkakör ("Movement of Work"), a group of socialist and avant-garde artists, photographers, and intellectuals centered around Budapest and Kassák. He wrote two articles for the journal Munka. By the end of the decade, Szabó and several other members of the communist organisation were expelled. The secessionists called themselves the Hungarian movement of the opposition.

During this time Szabó became acquainted with the German political philosopher Karl Korsch, whose uncompromising Marxism was connected to the leftist, anti-capitalist and, at the same time, anti-Bolshevik social movement that would define Szabó's philosophy and his work. He often used the sign "AO", for "AntiOrganisation", to sign his calligraphies. This sign later became a visual symbol in his work.

== Cooperation with Béla Tábor ==
In 1930, Lajos Szabó became acquainted with Béla Tábor, with whom he would have a close work relationship until the end of his life. The pair were united in their intellectual division from mainstream thought and moved together successively and rapidly towards existentialism, in direct contrast to the progress of political thought in the west. By the mid-thirties they had taken a direction that completely diverged from the Marxist movement.

Between 1931 and 1932, Szabó spent several months studying and writing in Germany, primarily in Berlin and Frankfurt at the Institute for Social Research. In 1933 and 1934, he went on study tours to Vienna and to Paris.

He wrote Vádirat a szellem ellen (The Indictment of the Spirit) in 1936 together with Béla Tábor. In 1937 A hit logikája – Teocentrikus logika (The Logic of Faith: A Theocentric Logic) was published. The second part of this work was published only long after his death. Lajos Szabó wrote a number of studies that were published only after his death: Megjegyzések a marxizmus kritikájához [Remarks on the Critique of Marxism], A tudományos szocializmus bírálatához [A Contribution to the Critique of Scientific Socialism], A mammonizmus természetrajzához [On the Nature of Mammonism], Adalékok a halmazelmélet kérdéseihez [Contributions to the Theory of Sets], Nietzsche).

A very important study by Lajos Szabó is Biblia és romantika (The Bible and Romanticism) which was written based on a lecture he gave in 1941.

== Budapest Dialogical School ==
Lajos Szabó and Béla Tábor laid the foundations of the Budapest Dialogical School in the post-war years. During these years they cooperated closely with Béla Hamvas, a writer and essayist and also with Lajos Fülep, an art historian. Lajos Szabó, Béla Tábor and Béla Hamvas came together regularly to discuss problems of philosophy and art theory, and their "intellectual community" came to be known as the "Thursday Talks". Stefánia Mándy, the wife of Béla Tábor and Katalin Kemény the wife of Béla Hamvas also took part in these conversations.

Lajos Szabó published two writings in 1946: Irodalom és rémület (Literature and Fright) Diárium and Művészet és vallás (Art and Religion) in Mouseion. Between 1946 and 1948 he delivered lectures to young intellectuals. His talks included detailed value theoretical and value psychological analyses. In these lectures Lajos Szabó strove at a synthesis of the pre-philosophical situation (e.g. Indian tradition and the pre-Socratic philosophers) with the post-philosophical approach, i.e. the critique of philosophy, religion and art which is to be found in the works of the great figures of the 19th century, such as Søren Aabye Kierkegaard, Fyodor Mikhailovich Dostoyevsky and Friedrich Nietzsche).

Lajos Szabó's thinking is closely related to the achievements of the philosophy of the dialogue as represented by Ferdinand Ebner, Franz Rosenzweig and Martin Buber, and he called himself also a "language philosopher". At the beginning of his lectures on value theory he pointed out that he identifies himself primarily with the Biblicism of Ferdinand Ebner, because he regards this approach basically unassailable, well-founded and as the one that goes furthest, although he believed that in important respects—primarily with regard to the evaluation of mathematics and art—Biblicism has to be re-examined and also criticised.

The most active participants of the seminar lectures were Attila Kotányi and György Kunszt who also made written records of the lectures. The lectures covered the following topics: psychology, value and sign theory, economics, existentialism, the Indian traditions, theory of sets, the concept of language maths and prismatism. The printed version of these lectures could be published only after 1990, long after Szabó´s death.

Lajos Szabó participated actively in the activities of the Európai Iskola (European School), which was a neo-avantgarde group of visual artists and writers. From 1949 on, in the period of Stalinist dictatorship in Hungary, close relationships emerged between the then underground movement of the Budapest School of the Philosophy of the Dialogue and the banned avantgarde visual artists, especially those who were members of the European School.

From the mid-1950s on, Lajos Szabó started to draw calligraphies. The year 1954 saw the creation of the first calligraphies which can be regarded to be "meditations expressed through drawings". After 1956 he left Hungary with his wife. He stayed in Vienna till the end of 1957 following which, till the end of 1961, he lived in Brussels. In 1960 Lajos Szabó travelled around West Germany, and his calligraphies were exhibited in Munich, Dortmund, Hamburg and Hagen. In 1962 he moved to Düsseldorf. In 1966 he had an exhibition in Paris. Lajos Szabó adopted the pseudonym "AO". On the one hand, this can be regarded as an ancronym formed from the adjective "anti-organisational", on the other hand, A and O were the vowels contained in his first and last names. For a period of time, he signed the calligraphies with "AO". Later, however, AO got transformed into a visual motif.

Lajos Szabó died on 21 October 1967 in Düsseldorf. His grave is in the Jewish cemetery of the town.

== Lajos Szabó, the philosopher ==
Although the knowledge of Marxism and its ways of thinking were indeed present in Lajos Szabó's thinking, his main sources were existentialist thinkers in particular the twentieth-century philosophy of the dialogue represented by Franz Rosenzweig and, above all, Ferdinand Ebner (Das Wort and die geistigen Realitäten).

These are the most important topics in the writings of Lajos Szabó:

- An emphasis was placed on the organic unity of the European tradition as a whole, including the arts, science, philosophy and religion.
- The unity of language and thinking and the methodological use of this conviction were emphasized.
- Based on the above and also on an anti-materialist and anti-Marxist theory of values, all value-creating processes (including the production of material goods) were attributed to 'research'.
- Research in this broad sense was considered to be a fundamental human activity. It was believed to include not only scientific research but also all types of arts and all human acts that indeed bring something new into the world, evidently not out of thin air, but inspired by cultural, linguistic and philosophical traditions.

His most-cited work, written together with his close associate, Béla Tábor, is Vádirat a szellem ellen (Indictment of the Spirit) consists of three parts.

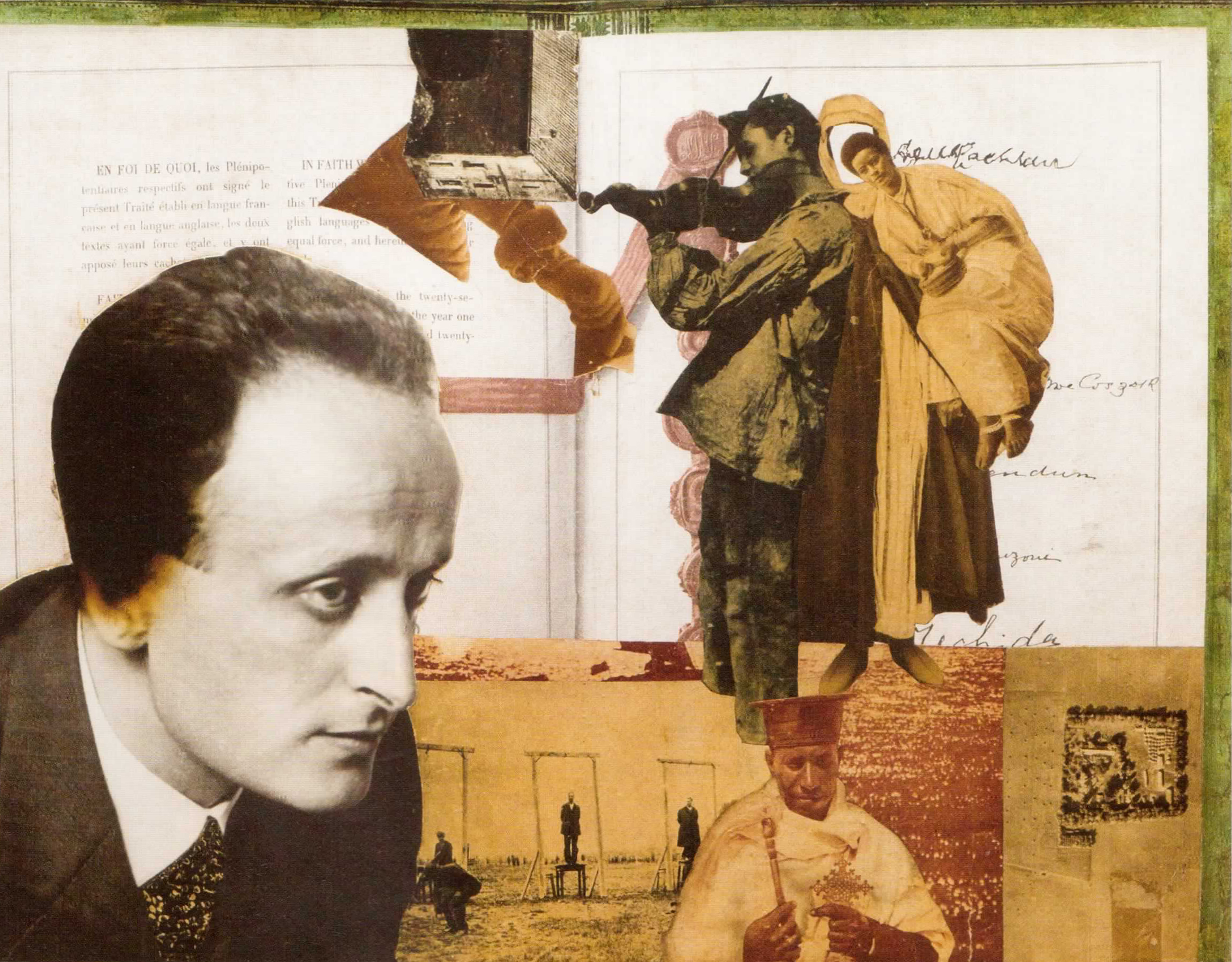
Lajos Vajda: Montage with Lajos Szabó, 1930–33, montage and pastel on paper. 49.66 × 54.5 cm (19.6 × 21.5 in)

This book takes the whole of intellectual life to account: "Someone should at last undertake performing the embarrassing task, and pull off the veil of innocence from the only factor which has remained intact so far in a world splintered along conflicting interests and characterised by the bellum omnium contra omnes, the spirit. (…) We are aware that when we undertake revealing intellectual life we become traitors to the class of intelligentsia. The «creative intelligentsia» seems to have had a very good time in the position which it occupied in the invisible hierarchy of society. It was the social class which could accuse without being accused, which could pass judgements without being judged. (…) This is an elegant and risk-free position to take. Nations fought terrible battles, millions died and the spirit could be the accuser: come and behold the work of politicians! Masses live in abject poverty, classes lose the ground below their feet, the mechanism of production bogs down, and the spirit can assume the role of the accuser: come and behold the social structure! Terrible epidemics decimate whole peoples and sordid sins are revealed, and the spirit can become the accuser again: come and see today's health-care! And what if we also mentioned all the depraved standards of morality! And all the accusations brought up by the intelligentsia are accompanied by a gestures of being ignored: if only the spirit could assume power…!"

The first part of the Indictment of the Spirit deals with the ongoing fragmentation of the spirit, which can be primarily seen in the arts and humanities. In this process language as a rational means of dialogue is ruined. The spirit renounces its leadership role, and pursues modest goals. This crisis can only be overcome if everyone who devotes their energies to researching a problem considers all the other proposed solutions to the problem as a personal challenge as a personal question addressed to them. The representatives of the spirit have to be aware of their own character traits, and also know, that in addition to influencing the masses, they themselves should learn from them.

The second part of this work deals with the practice and the theory of the spirit. The authors point out that the spirit has retreated into the theory, accepting at the same time the fact that practice has subjugated theory.

The third part of the book deals with the "geography of the spirit" The problem of Marxism, the authors point out, is that the objective of this movement, i.e. the creation of a new man, is not compatible with the dictatorial means whereby this objective is to be achieved. The authors, followers of the philosophy of the dialogue, assert that the main cause of the crisis is the helplessness of the spirit.

In his review, Béla Hamvas pointed out that this book should be regarded an anthropological study. He finishes his evaluation with the following words: "The real history of man is man's history of becoming godlike (…) Being a man means to have a fate, in which, in spite of errors and mistakes, there is always an opportunity for becoming godlike." This book review by Béla Hamvas, which at the time of its writing the publisher refused to publish because he thought the reviewer gave this work too much recognition, finishes with the highly topical, indeed poetic statement: "Life becomes more and more difficult for man, because he knows more and more. And he who knows a lot, and does not live accordingly, points out Jan van Ruysbroek, is lost once and for all."

== Lajos Szabó, the calligrapher ==
In the last stage of Szabó's life, a speculative graphic art played an important role. "Szabó's genre within graphic art is the abstract calligraphy (…) When calligraphy is substituted by abstract calligraphy, this means that the letters are substituted by signs and by the image. A religious person must have a great deal of courage to make this step towards abstraction. Lajos Szabó came to the recognition that signs, inspired by letters and replacing them, are the direct manifestations of the soul."

Lajos Szabó created his first calligraphies in 1954. "The abstract line of the emerging works »is not the abstraction of something«. It is not the abstract reflection of something concrete in reality, but it is rather the primary reality. It is the sign, the reflection and the breakthrough of the growing soul, it is »non-representational« in a way defined by Malewitsch. It is an inventive, internal spiritual reality. The carrier of this reality is just the line. The manifestations of the line are the traces that the pencil or the pen leave on a sheet of paper.

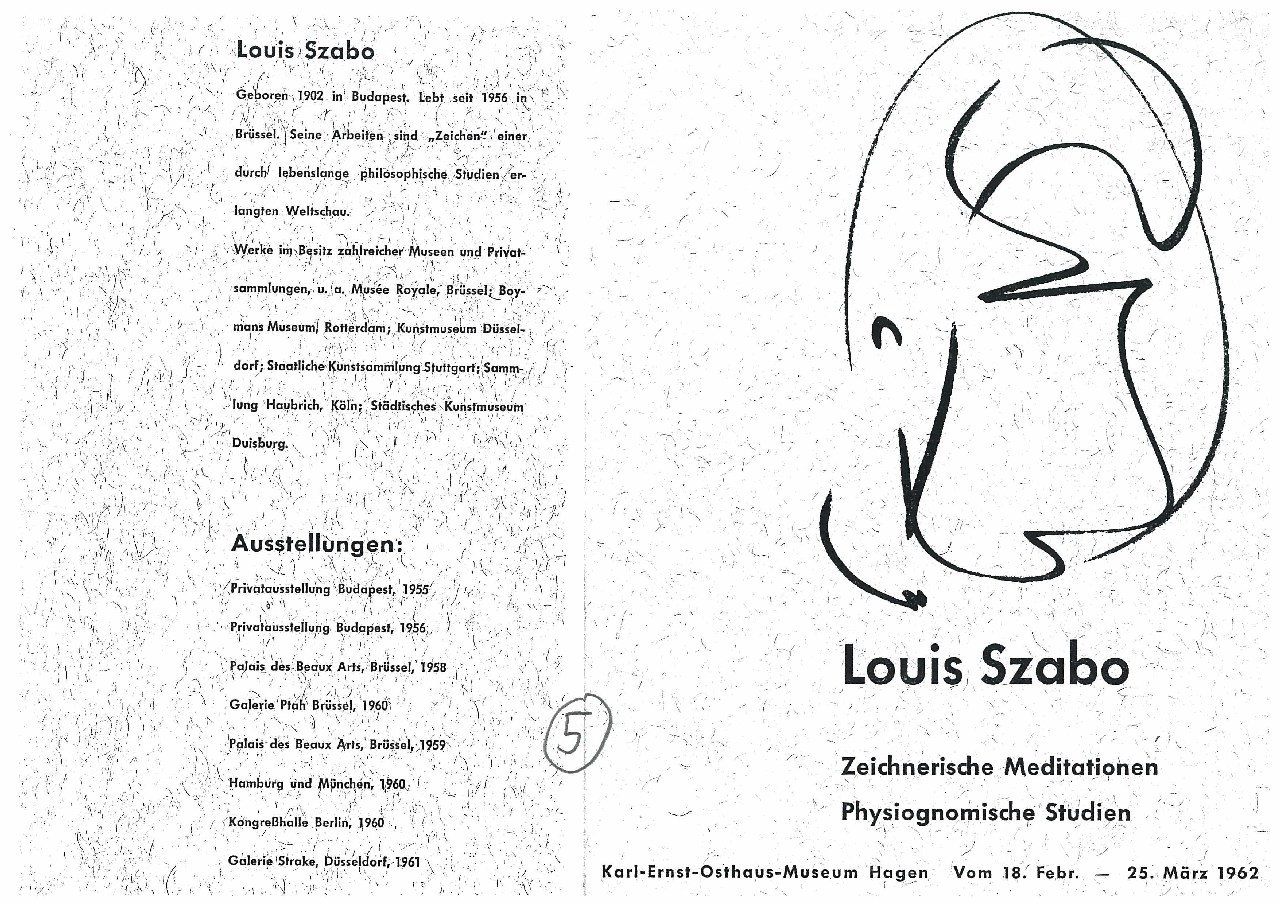
Exhibition invitation card, 1962, Hagen, Germany

A meaningful number of calligraphies originating from the period preceding the end of 1956 was exhibited in 1980 in the Budapest Club of Young Artists. (The curators of the exhibition were Dániel Bíró and Botond Kocsis.)

In December of 1957 Lajos Szabó's works were exhibited together with the works of Lajos Vajda, Endre Bálint, Attila Kotányi and Lyubomir Szabó in the Palais Des Beaux Arts in Brussels.

Lajos Szabó's calligraphies are preserved in a number of non-Hungarian museums: Musée Royal, Brussels; Museum Boijmans Van Beuningen Rotterdam; Museum Kunstpalast, Düsseldorf; Staatliche Kunstsammlung Stuttgart; Sammlung Haubrich im Museum Ludwig Köln; Städtisches Kunstmuseum, Duisburg; Stiftung Lehmbruch Museum-Zentrum Internationalen Skulptur, Duisburg; Kunstmuseum Bochum Kunstsammlung.

The Berlin Calligraphy Collection in Berlin's Akademie der Künste has a total of 414 calligraphies by Lajos Szabó which were created before Szabó's emigration to the West.

== Exhibitions ==
- 1955 Budapest, studio exhibition of the first calligraphies
- 1956 Budapest, studio exhibition
- 1957 Brussels, Palais des Beaux Arts: Peintres Hongrois, Lajos Vajda, Lajos Szabó, André Bálint, Attila Kotányi, Lyubomir Szabó
- 1959 Brussels, Palais des Beaux Arts
- 1960 Brussels, Galerie Ptah: Louis Szabo
- 1960 Hamburg, Haus der Begegnung
- 1960 Dortmund, Fritz-Henßler-Haus
- 1960 Berlin, Kongresshalle
- 1961 Düsseldorf, Galerie Strake
- 1962 Hagen, Karl-Ernst-Osthaus-Museum: Louis Szabo, Zeichnerische Meditationen-Physiognomische Studien
- 1980 Budapest, Club of Young Artists: Lajos Szabó, An Introduction and a Selection from calligraphies created in the years 1954–1956
- 1994 Abbey of Pannonhalma, Hungary
- 1997 Budapest, Ernst Múzeum: Die spekulativen grafischen Bildschriften von Lajos Szabó (1902–1967)
- 1998 Düsseldorf, City Museum: Die spekulativen grafischen Bildschriften von Lajos Szabó (1902–1967)
- 2011 Eger, Hungary, Ars GEometrica Galéria
- 2011 Budapest, 2B Galéria, Presence-of Mind Calligraphies, 1957–1967
