= Margit Anna =

Hungarian artist (1913–1991)

- Margit Anna (left) with her painter husband Imre Ámos in the 1930s
- Born: Margit Sichermann; 23 December 1913; Borota, Austria-Hungary
- Died: 3 June 1991 (aged 77); Budapest, Hungary
- Known for: Painting
- Movement: Abstract Expressionism, Surrealism
- Spouse: Imre Ámos (19??-1944/1945; his death)

Margit Anna (born Margit Sichermann; 23 December 1913 – 3 June 1991) was a twentieth century Hungarian painter. Her artwork was considered abstract expressionism, utilizing bold colors and textures along with influences of surrealism. Her largest influences were her own identity, particularly after her husband's death during World War II, as well as humankind's exposure to tragedy throughout history.

During the Communist rule of Hungary, she was barred from participating in the art world, but she began to paint again in the mid-1960s. Her pictures symbolized suppressed tragedy such as Pleasure Ride (1967) and Innocence Tale (1964), with surreal and expressive metamorphoses of the puppet motif.

== Early life ==
Margit Sichermann was born on 23 December 1913 to a Jewish family from Borota, located in the Jánoshalma District of Bács-Kiskun county.

She attended the Hungarian Academy of Fine Arts in 1936 as a pupil of János Vaszary; her first exhibition was arranged with her husband, Imre Ámos, who was also an artist. After finishing school, she moved from Budapest to Szentendre and continued to create artwork. While visiting Paris in 1937 with her husband, she met Marc Chagall, who influenced both her artwork greatly upon her return to Hungary. Her early period was similar to Ámos's art, characterized by lyric presentation and grotesque elements. Her work was mostly figurative, featuring self-portraits, but has the foundations of later expressionism through the use of bold, blocked colours and expressive brushstrokes.

== World War II ==
Anna and her husband Imre lived relatively peacefully until World War II. After being called to the battlefield, Imre was killed in Ohrdruf, a Nazi concentration camp in 1944. Her father was murdered in Auschwitz. Widowed, Anna's art was greatly impacted by the loss of her husband, her paintings becoming notably harsher and more elemental than her earlier works. Her work embraced a new motif after his death, using puppet-like figures throughout her paintings. These puppets often interacted with various tragedies of humankind, such as the Holocaust, through surrealist images.

She also created a number of self-portraits depicting herself in different scenarios, experimenting with her self-image and her place in the world. Her status as a Jewish widow in poverty led her to depict her differences through her art and to subvert them with her self-portraits as well, depicting herself in positions such as a dancer, prostitute, and circus performer. Her work became much more expressive and abstract, utilizing layers of paint and distorting the human figure.

Through the encouragement of the art community in Szentendre, particularly Lajos Vajda and Dezsö Korniss, Anna began to expand on her work and incorporated traditional Hungarian folklore motif and symbols. She co-founded the Hungarian European School in 1945, and exhibited her work in their galleries regularly.

== Communist rule in Hungary ==
During Communist rule, Anna and her artwork became classified as "forbidden" under the "Three T" rule implemented throughout the country. This category led to her work being banned from exhibition, leaving her unable to exhibit her art until 1968. This was due to the subversive nature of her work, which depicted women as witches, covered religious themes, and provided a connection to traditional Hungarian folklore and art. During this time, she survived on selling occasional commission pieces to private clients.

== Death and commemoration ==
Anna's final paintings returned to the topic of self-portraiture. She depicted herself in old age, with her body growing frailer, returning to her concepts of identity. These self-portraits were the last paintings she created before her death on 3 June 1991, at age 77.

Her first full posthumous exhibition When Dolls Speak Retrospective Exhibition of Margit Anna (1913–1991) was held in 2024 at the Hungarian National Gallery.

== Works ==
- Gallery of Anna's works
