= Szentkáta =

Village in Hungary

Coordinates: 46.314°N 19.232°E

Szentkáta (Szentkata, Alsó-, Felső- and Csesznekszentkáta) was a little village in Hungary in Bács-Bodrog county. The abandoned village was refounded by the Cseszneky family in the late 18th century. Szentkáta is part of Kunsági wine-growing region.

Now it is divided between Borota village and Jánoshalma town in Bács-Kiskun county, Hungary.
