= Ferdinand Ebner =

Austrian philosopher (1882–1931)

Ferdinand Ebner (January 31, 1882 in Wiener Neustadt – October 17, 1931 in Gablitz, Austria), was an Austrian elementary school teacher and philosopher. Together with Martin Buber and Franz Rosenzweig, he is considered one of the most outstanding representatives of dialogical philosophy. Ebner's philosophy is about man existing in a I-Thou personal relationship with God and with others. His thought has similarities with the Christian existentialism of Gabriel Marcel. On the basis of the unity of I and Thou, which has in language (in the spoken word), and in love its expressions, Ebner developed a religiously informed philosophy of language which led to his practical-ethical understanding of the Christian faith as the basis for the personal fulfillment and the whole social progress.

== Life and work ==
In 1897, after finishing school, Ebner entered the Teachers' Training College in Wiener Neustadt. In 1900 a lung disease forced him to interrupt his courses. He had to spend four weeks in a health resort in Gleichenberg and then five months in a lung sanatorium in Alland. His sister Josephine had died of tuberculosis, just one year after her marriage. The young student felt ill and depressed. After one year interruption Ebner completed his study at the Teachers´ Training College in 1902 with best qualifications. After ten years in Waldegg, in 1912 his job took Ebner to Gablitz near Vienna, from where he could again take refuge in the Viennese cultural scene. He spent whole days visiting Vienna's churches, museums, concert halls, theaters and coffee houses. There, he discussed with friends and acquaintances, and immersed himself for hours in "Die Fackel" and the "Brenner".

Ebner dealt all his life with philosophical and religious issues. He was a great reader: literature, philosophy, psychology. He read Otto Weininger's Sex and Character, later Pascal, Arthur Schopenhauer, Søren Kierkegaard and Friedrich Nietzsche, to name a few. His first philosophical work Ethic and Life: fragments of a metaphysics of individual existence (1913-1914) remained unpublished until 2013. His major work is The Word and the spiritual Realities: Pneumatological Fragments. It was published by Ludwig von Ficker´s Brenner-Verlag in 1921. He published a few more articles in Ficker´s Brenner Review. Ludwig von Ficker remained until Ebner´s death one of his best friends.

In 1923 Ebner became reluctantly the head of the school, but he had to retire soon due to further illnesses and depressions, which led him to two suicide attempts. After his stay at the sanatorium Burg Hartenstein, he married his colleague Maria Mizera. They had a son, Walter Ebner. Ebner died of tuberculosis in Gablitz, where he is buried, in 1931. Before dying he had time to finish his important work Aphorismen 1931.

Ebner's estate is located in the Brenner-Archiv in Innsbruck.

Ebner´s work has had an important influence in many fields of the human knowledge and in the modern comprehension of the Christian faith. As Moltmann said in his Theology of Hope, Ebner used Pascal´s and Kierkegaard´s thought to talk about "the breaking through of the eternity in the present" (Schriften I, 259, 912). In so doing Ebner wanted to point out the importance of prayer and of man´s decision of religious faith. But Ebner did not stop there and went on to affirm the God of the resurrection of Jesus Christ (I,568; II, 625), the God of the "promised salvation", of the "divine promise" (I,432,447,610), of "the Kingdom of God" (I, 609), so that in our faith in Jesus Christ rests our Christian "legitimate hope in the future" (I,568). Jesus Christ is for Ebner, as the Gospel says, "the light of the world" (I,570) until the complete lightness when he returns, until "the Second Coming" (I,302-303). Man´s responsibility and task is "to help establish the Kingdom of God" (I,573: "die Herrschaft Gottes aufrichten zu helfen"). Ebner´s personalism and religious thought has influenced both the Protestant and the catholic world, from Emil Brunner, Dietrich Bonhoeffer and Jürgen Moltmann to Karl Rahner, Hans Küng and Joseph Ratzinger.

During the tragic events of the first World War, Ebner tried to understand "the signs of the times" (Mat 16, 3) to grasp the meaning of human life and human history. "Dreaming about the spirit" as often men do was not the right answer. In the I-solitude (Icheinsamkeit) without a real relationship with God, our Thou, we dream of the spirit in the different cultural expressions. But when the right I-Thou encounter takes place we do not separate theory and praxis anymore, because we are able to understand Matthew 25,40: "as you did this to one of the least of these brothers of mine, you did it to me" (I, 268). Living in a real, true relationship with God and our neighbour means waking up to the "spiritual realities", the end of our just "dreaming of the spirit". So can men be creative and work for a better society without forgetting justice and solidarity, the brother in need.

== Bibliography ==
- Online: Anita Bertoldi: Bibliografia di Ferdinand Ebner (Dialegesthai) and www.ebner-gesellschaft.org
- Ebner, Ferdinand: Das Wort und die geistigen Realitäten. Pneumatologische Fragmente. Innsbruck: Brenner Verlag 1921; Wien: Herder 1952; Baden-Baden: Suhrkamp 1980.
- Ebner, Ferdinand: Wort und Liebe. H. Jone (Ed.).Regensburg: Pustet Verlag 1935.
- Ebner, Ferdinand: Schriften, I, II, III. Ed. Franz Seyr. München: Kösel Verlag KG 1963-1965.
- Ebner, Ferdinand: Mühlauer Tagebuch. 23.7.-28.8.1920, Richard Hörmann-Monika Seekircher (ed.) Wien: Böhlau 2001.
- Ebner, Ferdinand: Tagebuch 1916. Fragment aus dem Jahre 1916.Markus Flatscher-Richard Hörmann (ed.). Wien-Berlin-Münster-Zürich-London: Lit-Verlag 2007.
- Ebner, Ferdinand: Das Wort und die geistigen Realitäten. Pneumatologische Fragmente. Richard Hörmann (ed.). Wien-Berlin-Münster-Zürich-London: Lit Verlag, 2009.
- Ebner, Ferdinand: Tagebuch 1917. Matthias Flatscher-Richard Hörmann (ed.). Berlin-Wien-Münster-Zürich-London: Lit Verlag 2011.
- Ebner, Ferdinand: Ethik und Leben. Fragmente einer Metaphysik der individuellen Existenz. Richard Hörmann, Ernst Pavelka (Ed.). Berlin-Münster-Wien-Zürich-London: Lit Verlag 2013.
- Ebner, Ferdinand: Tagebuch 1918. Markus Flatscher, Richard Hörmann (Ed.). Berlin-Wien-Münster-Zürich-London: Lit Verlag 2014.
- Ebner, Ferdinand: Wort und Liebe. Aphorismen 1931. Richard Hörmann und Krzysztof Skorulski (Ed.). Berlin-Wien-Münster-Zürich-London: Lit Verlag 2014.
