= Endre Bálint =

Hungarian painter and graphic artist

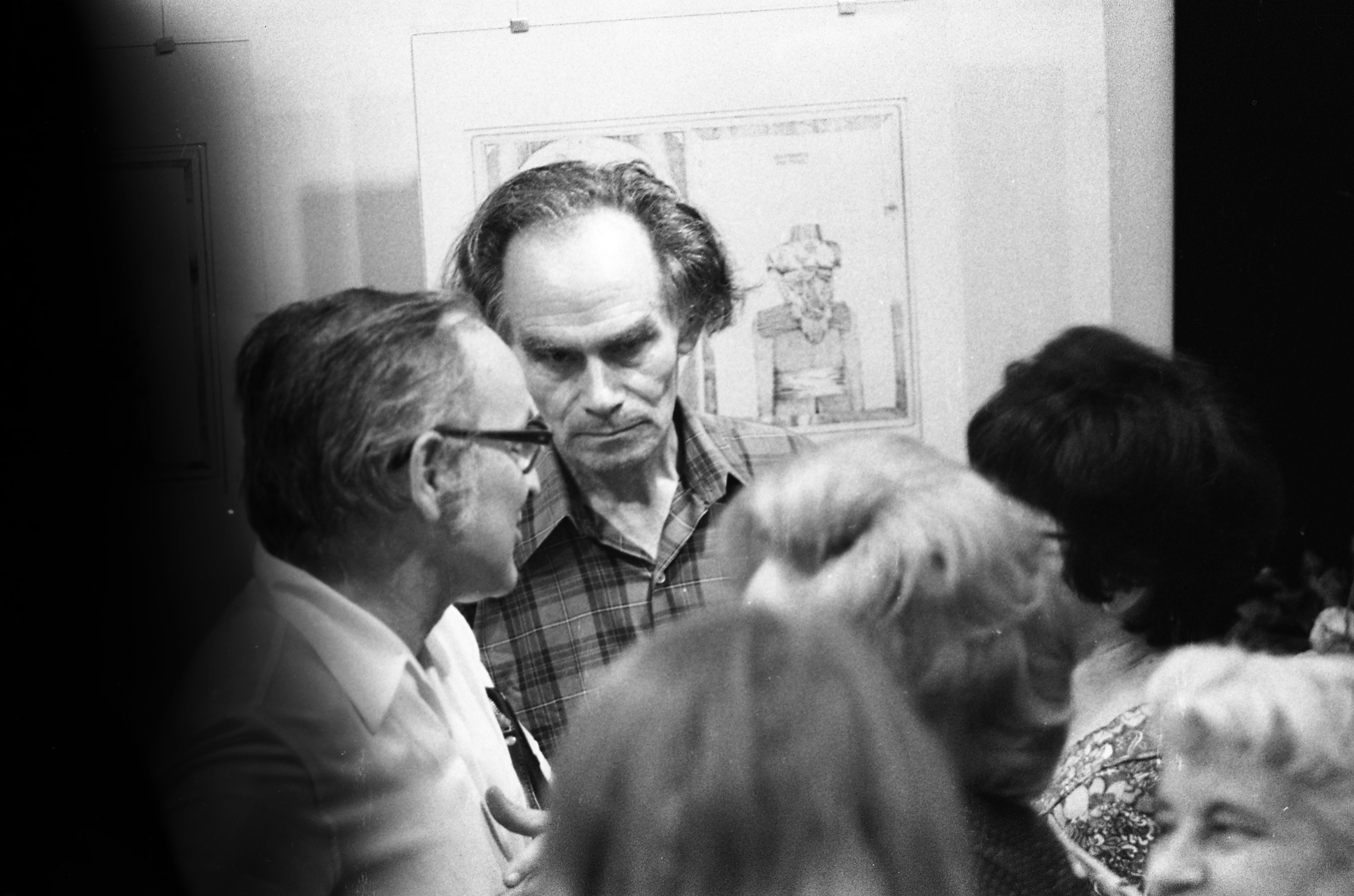
Endre Bálint (centre), 1975

Endre Bálint (1914–1986, in Budapest) was a Hungarian painter and graphic designer. He was one of the most significant figures of modern, avant-garde Hungarian art.

== Early life ==
Bálint was born in 1914 into an intellectual Jewish family. His father, Aladár Bálint, was a well-known art critic in the West, and his uncle was the writer and editor Ernő Osvát. His sister, Klára Bálint, married writer and literary historian Antal Szerb in 1938.

When he was 16-years old, he was admitted to the graphic arts department of the Hungarian Royal School of Applied Arts, majoring in advertising graphics. However, it soon became clear that he was also strongly attracted to painting. At 20, Bálint traveled to Paris for three months and was introduced to modern painting styles.

Upon his return home, Bálint met Lajos Vajda at the private school of János Vaszary, with whom he soon formed a personal and artistic friendship. In 1936, he studied at Vilmos Aba-Novák's private school. In 1938, his first collection exhibition was organized in the Tamás Gallery. From then on, Bálint began garnering attention from art critics dealing with the development of modern Hungarian art, especially the art historian and critic Ernő Kállai.

== Career & Later life ==
In 1945, he was one of the founding members of the group of artists called the European School. Bálint began spending more time in Paris in 1937, here, he met André Breton and participated in the International Surrealist World Exhibition. Until 1956, Bálint was not allowed to hold an exhibition in this country, he was placed in the forbidden category.

Bálint left Hungary and lived in Paris between 1957 and 1962. His famous Bálint were made here. After 1962, in Hungary, his art began gradually moving from the tolerated category to the subsidized one. He took part in many exhibitions with his photographs taken during his time in Paris, and some from when he returned. In the last decade of his life, Bálint received many awards including the Kossuth Prize. He died of lung disease in 1986 at 72, after a long battle with the illness.

His son István Bálint is a poet, actor, and director.

In 2007, the Home Gallery in Budapest organized a commemorative exhibition of his works.

== Art ==
Bálint's paintings primarily took Dadaist, Constructivist, Surrealist and abstract inspirations.

Around 10 of his works are kept by the Ferenczy Museum in Szentendre and he has a picture in the Deák Collection in Székesfehérvár; but most of his works are privately owned.

== Selected works ==
=== Paintings ===
- My Room at the Bindendorfs, 1937
- Self-portrait, 1942
- Still-life, 1946
- House at Szentendre, 1948
- Root Dance, 1952
- Stone Bird, 1952
- Statue in a Cemetery, 1959
- Houses at Hastings, 1959
- Homesickness, 1959

=== Writings & Books ===
- From Diary of Lies; Magvető, Bp., 1972
- Biographical scraps; Magvető, Bp., 1984 (Facts and witnesses)
- It's about my destiny. Writings, poems, essays, etc.; Magvető, Bp., 1987
- Pictures for the Bible; ed., biblical textual translation. Tibor Sántó; Officina Nova, Bp., 1990
- Bible; respectively Endre Bálint, trans. Ferenc Gál et al., inv. Ferenc Gál, István Kosztolányi; University, Bp., 1991
- Hope was torn in four directions. Selected writings; vol., ed. Katalin Mezey; Széphalom Book Workshop, Bp., 2015
