= Burg Hartenstein =

Castle in Lower Austria

Coordinates: 48°26′47″N 15°23′47″E

- Lower Austria, Austria
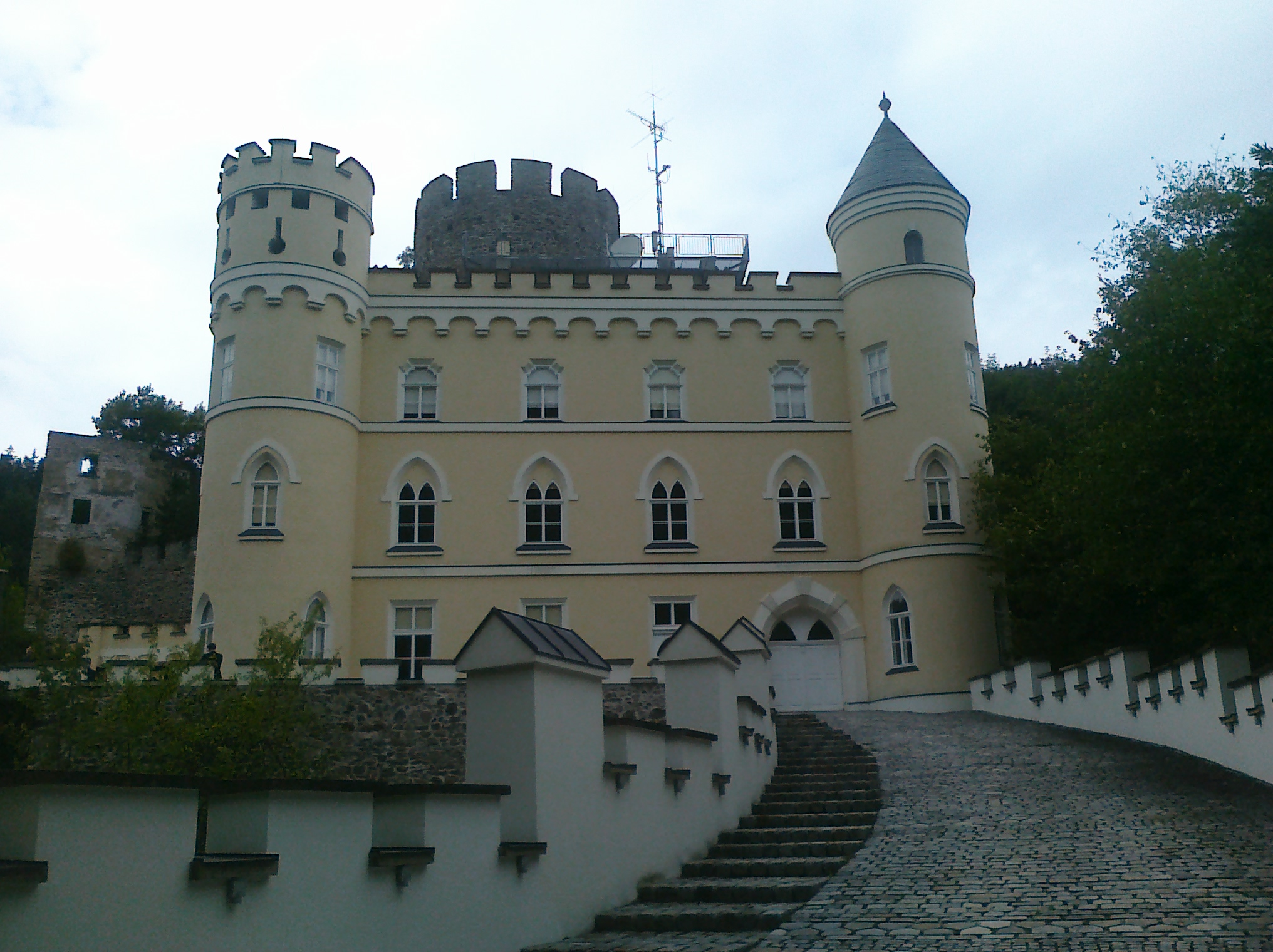

Site information
- Type: Castle

Burg Hartenstein is a castle in Lower Austria, Austria. Burg Hartenstein is 516 metres (1,693 ft) above sea level.

== See also ==
- List of castles in Austria
