= Lajos Vajda =

Hungarian painter and graphic artist

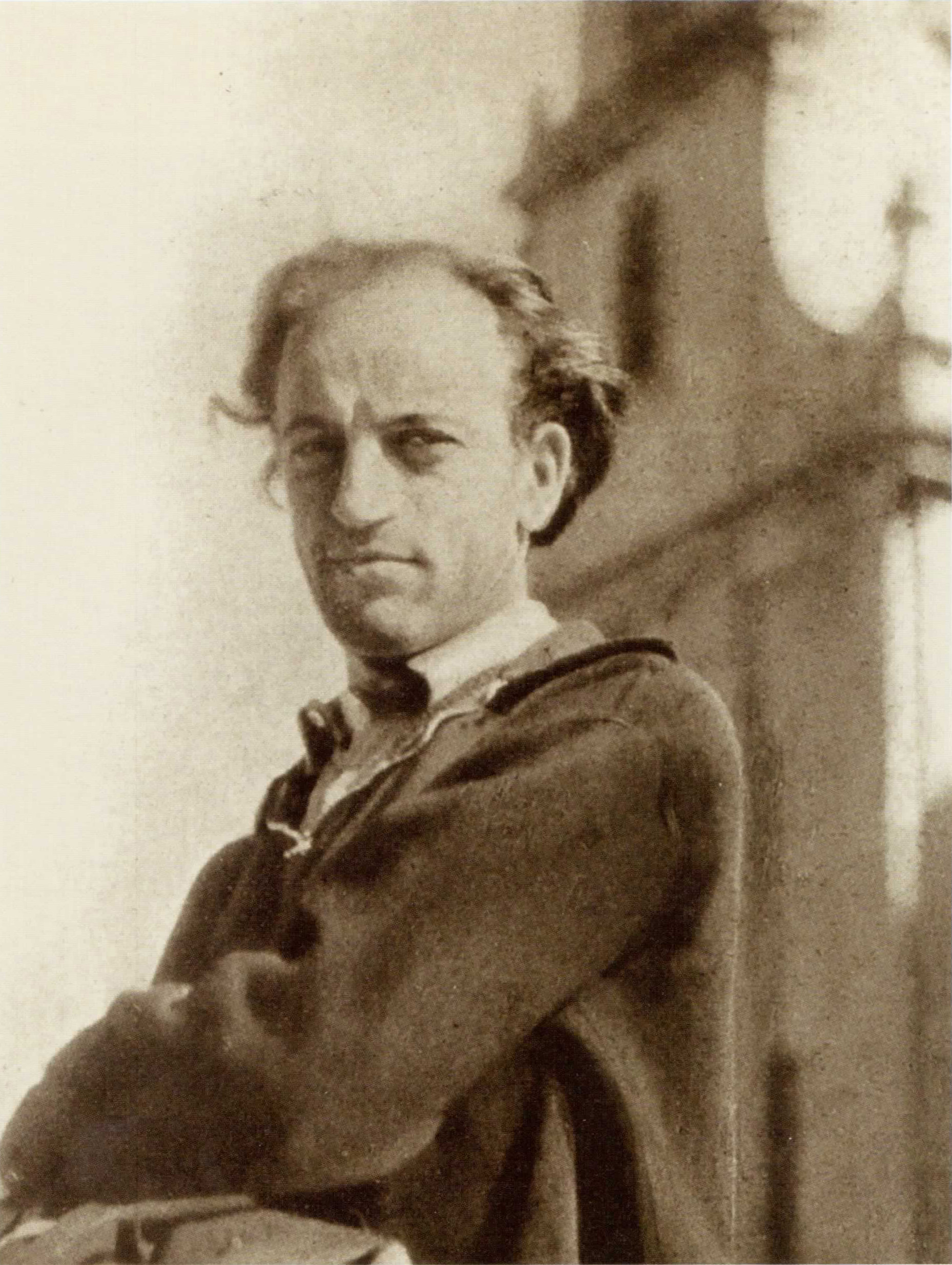
- Lajos Vajda in Szentendre (1939)
- Born: 6 August 1908; Zalaegerszeg
- Died: 7 September 1941 (aged 33); Budakeszi
- Movement: Avant-garde

Lajos Vajda (Hungarian: Vajda Lajos; 1908, Zalaegerszeg – 1941, Budakeszi) was a Hungarian painter and graphic artist. From 1927 to 1930 he was a student of István Csók at the Royal Academy of Fine Arts.

Vajda stayed in Paris between 1930 and 1934 and, in addition to the most recent trends in French painting, he also got acquainted with the outstanding works of the Russian Realist film. This prompted him to create his dramatic photo-montages of the great cataclysms of mankind, war, hunger, armed violence and abject misery. From 1934 onwards, he collected folk art motifs in Szentendre and Szigetmonostor. In his style, folk art and Orthodox Christian, Roman Catholic and Jewish symbols were combined with abstract and surrealistic elements. His last abstract surrealistic drawings foreshadow the horrors of World War II. He died of tuberculosis in 1941.

"Over a ten-year period, Vajda created an impressive oeuvre, the formal and content-related preoccupations of which were rooted in Constructivism and Surrealism. (...) His independence from the dogmas of these two movements, his great inventiveness and his use of local historical materials helped define the Hungarian avantgarde."

== Chronology ==
- 1908 Lajos Vajda was born into a Jewish family on 6 August 1908 in the town of Zalaegerszeg, Hungary. His father, Emánuel Vajda, was a court clerk at the local county court. His mother was Judit Fürst. "She was a religious woman. Under her influence, the family kept the Jewish festivals and lit a candle on Friday evenings. Lajos Vajda had three siblings: Miklós, Teréz and Márton. All of Lajos Vajda's siblings were murdered in the Holocaust. "Lajos Vajda started to draw regularly at the age of five. He made illustrations to tales by copying sample drawings. Later on, he magnified the original reproductions relying on a precise and disciplined technique." In his first drawings there are warships, battle signs, and later he captured his surroundings and family members.
- 1916 The family moved to Serbia, which was at that time under Austrian military occupation. In Belgrade Vajda went to a Serbian school, then to a German school. In a letter written to his lover and future wife, Júlia Richter he writes as follows: „You think I don’t know German. The truth is that I also learnt German for two years (classes three and four) in Belgrade, at the Austrian elementary school called K.u.K. Guvermentalschule Belgrade, Kraljica Natlia ulica.”. Later on the family settled in Valjevo, a town in western Serbia. „The family was living in abject poverty for six years first in Belgrade, then in Valjevo. Lajos went to a German elementary school in classes three and four in Belgrade, in the Austrian school. He went to secondary school in Serbia. He was an excellent student especially interested in History and Geography. It was in Serbia that he got acquainted with Pravoslav churches. At that time, he made portraits and drew after models. His teachers and art lovers predicted a great future for the boy.
- 1917 His first known drawings were produced.
- 1922-1924 The family moved back to Hungary. The talented young artist received encouragement from his teachers and studied at the Budapest open drawing school of OMIKE (the Hungarian Jewish Educational Association) under the tutelage of Lipót Herman. His uncle, Mihály Vajda became an important figure in Vajda’s life. Mihály Vajda was a journalist, and for some years he was the Paris correspondent of his paper. It was in his uncle’s library that Lajos Vajda developed a keen interest in art.

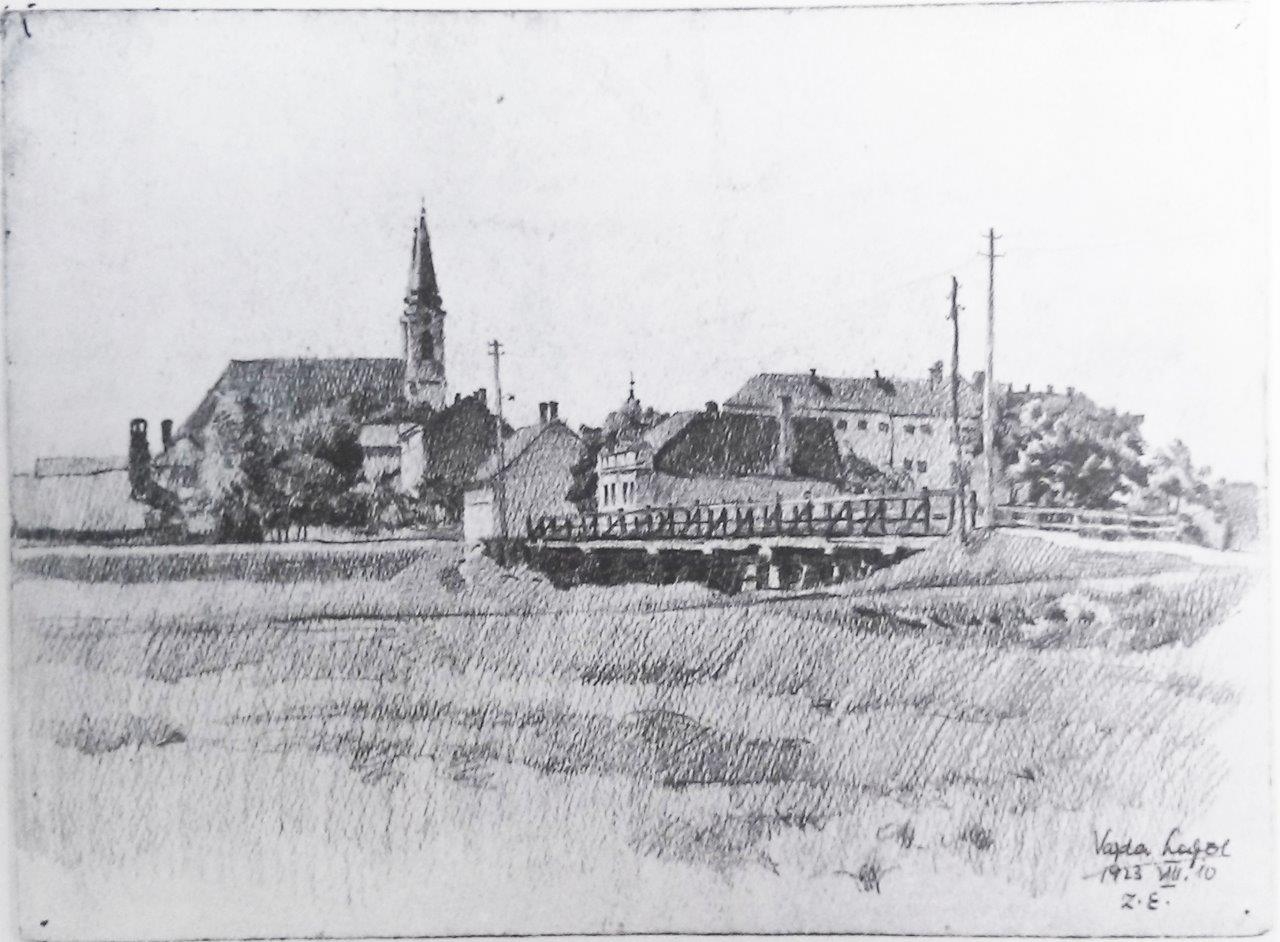
Cityscape of Zalagerszeg, 1923, pencil, paper, 218×298 mm

- 1923 Vajda's parents and her sister returned to Hungary. First, they lived in Zalaegerszeg, then in the town of Szentendre that, due to its proximity to Budapest and its location on the Danube, was a favourite holiday destination. At the end of the 17th century, Serbs fleeing from the Turks came to this town and built „seven Pravoslav churches that up to the present day determine the image of this town on the Danube. The Pravoslav church icons conjured up in Vajda early childhood memories, and their atmosphere had a great influence on Vajda’s artistic world.” The unique architecture of Szentendre fascinated the artist. „The whole being and soul of the artist was closely associated with this town. Vajda regarded Szentendre as his town."
- 1925–26 "At the age of seventeen, one day he walked very far from his home to paint, got caught in a thunderstorm, came home soaked to the skin and didn’t change. He then fell seriously ill and was taken to hospital shortly thereafter, where he was treated for six months." Vajda fell ill with bone tuberculosis and had to be operated on seven times.
- 1927 "Soon after this, in 1927 his mother, whom Lajos loved dearly, died. He mourned her until the end of his life." He spent the summer in Valjevo at his brother, Miklós. "In the autumn – against his father's will but with his sister's support – he takes the entrance examination for the Royal Academy of Fine Arts. He is granted a place there, becoming a pupil of István Csók."
- 1928 Vajda enrolled at the Royal Hungarian Academy of Arts, becoming a pupil of István Csók. At the Academy he made friends with Dezső Korniss, György Kepes, Sándor Trauner and Béla Hegedüs. Together they started visiting the events of the Munka circle, an avant-garde grouping headed by Lajos Kassák. "In terms of their world view, they were socialists, artistically, they were the followers of constructivism.” Vajda participated in the exhibition of the academy students. The works shown there provoked the harsh criticism of conservative artists and art lovers.
- 1929 In May, at the initiative of conservative faculty members, who were dissatisfied with István Csók and János Vaszary, the State Control Committee carried out an investigation at the Academy, and Lajos Vajda, Dezső Korniss, György Kepes, Sándor Trauner were expelled from the college. Vajda took part in the exhibition of KÚT that took place in the National Salon. KÚT (New Association of Visual Artists) was a group of young artists that advocated modern trends in art.
- 1930 Vajda took part in the exhibition of the New Progressive Artists at the Tamás Gallery. In autumn, he travelled to Paris, and he lived there until the spring of 1934. He stayed at an inexpensive hotel of the Latin Quarter of Paris. He met the philosopher, Lajos Szabó who had a great influence on his artistic approach. Influenced by Sergei Eisenstein and Vsevolod Pudovkin and realizing that there is no chance for him to make films, he started to make photo montages. „His financial circumstances were so bad that he could only sustain himself with a poor diet, and there was even a time when he ate nothing for a few days and lay in bed with weakness. / He, like so many people, took various odd jobs to exist. (...) His two favourite museums were the anthropology museum, Musée de l'Homme and the Musée Guimet. "He did not try to have success by acquiring some fashionable methods of paintings thus becoming a part of the art scene and accepted by art dealers.
- 1934 Physically worn out, but artistically rejuvenated and prepared, he returned to Hungary. Hard years were coming. Vajda could not count on official support because of his Jewish origins and artistic creed.
- 1935 In the summer he and his closest friend, Dezső Korniss started to draw the motifs of both Szentendre and of the nearby villages. In the autumn of 1935, at the students' canteen of the National Hungarian Jewish Cultural Association, Vajda met Júlia Richer, a Hungarian Jewish girl from Bratislava, who was studying at the College Applied Art.
- 1935–36 In cooperation with his painter friend, Dezső Korniss he worked out a new artistic approach whose objective was to create a new East-Central European art style that could be a bridge between East and West, and between the Byzantian and pre-classic tradition on the one hand and the avant-garde tradition on the other.
- 1936 He submitted a painting to the exhibition of KÚT (The New Society of Visual Artists). “But the jury rejected it pointing out that the work reveals the talent of its creator, but it lacks maturity.”
- 1937 In the autumn Vajda's first studio exhibition takes place in the studio flat of Imre Ámos, Margit Anna. "After many years abroad, Ernő Kállai who just got home was glad to see that he can see genuinely modern endeavours also in Hungary.”
- 1937-38 His father stopped giving material support that, until then, had ensured him his livelihood. He worked in the trick film studio of Gyula Macskássy. He made 30 pengős a month as a phase drawer.
- 1938. On 9 January he married Júlia Richter.
- 1940 The painter’s second studio exhibition took place in the studio flat of Piroska Szántó and Gusztáv Seiden. In September Vajda was called up for labor service, the alternative military service required of "politically unreliable" Hungarian-Jewish men in Hungary during the war. Due to his poor health, however, he was released from labour service after three weeks. „He was admitted to St. John's Hospital. He stayed there for eight months. (…) Five days before his death, he told me he would not stay in the hospital anymore, not even for a minute, so I should take him "home" to my rented apartment. His doctor told me that I could take Lajos home, as he is a moribund patient. I should only take care of myself. (…) The people in this house were very angry with me for bringing a dying man into the apartment. I called the Budakeszi Sanatorium. The ambulance took us there. It was Saturday morning.
- 1941 Lajos Vajda died on September 7 at the Lung Sanatorium in the village of Budakeszi near Budapest. "The next morning, when I went up to the first floor, the Sunday mass was taking place on the ground floor, I asked Lajos if he would like to listen. "If I could hear the same thing well, yes," he replied. He hardly said anything all day. He no longer clung to the living, he spoke of his mother. He died very quietly."
- 1943 Ernő Kállai organizes Lajos Vajda's memorial exhibition in the Alkotás Art House.
- 1946 Elected honorary member of the European School
- 1948–69 The official art policy ignored Vajda. His oeuvre was preserved by Júlia Vajda for almost two decades.
- 1969 The King St. Stephen Museum of Székesfehérvár, Hungary organized Vajda's first museum exhibition.
- 1986 The Vajda Museum opened in Szentendre with 100 works by the artist.
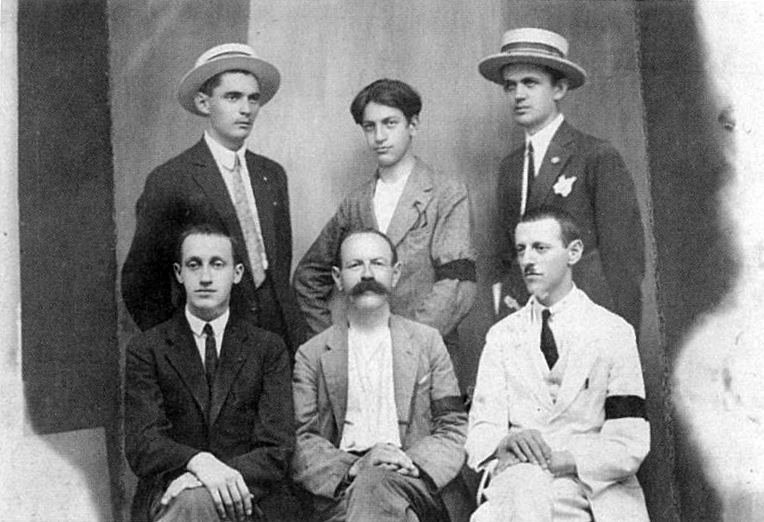
Lajos Vajda with His Family After His Mother's Death, 1927

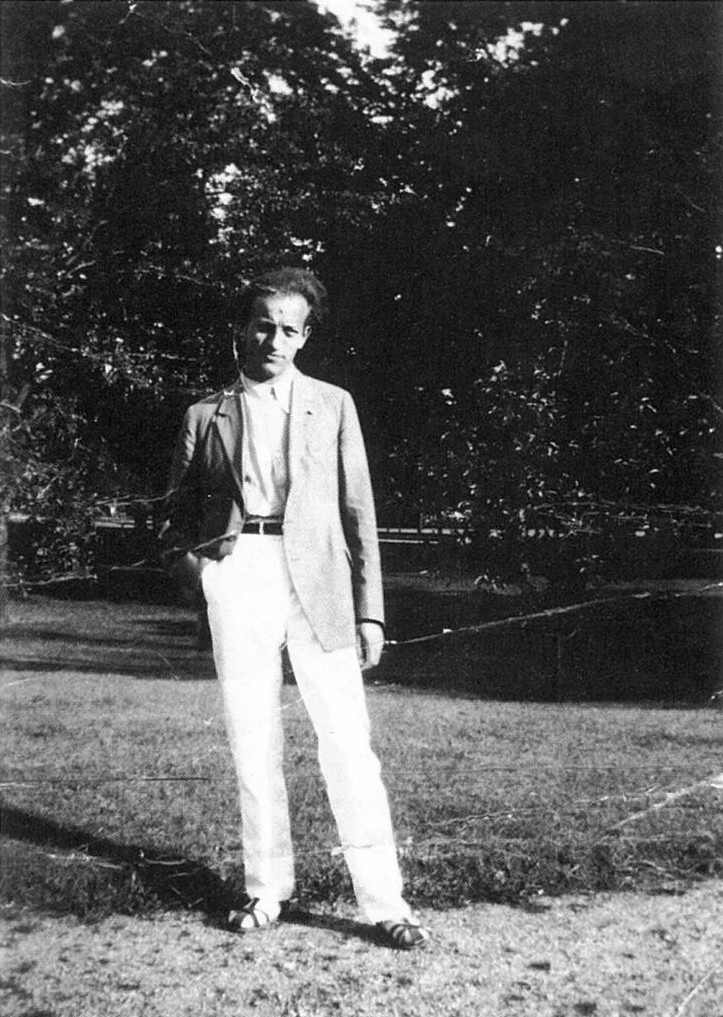
Lajos Vajda, 1936

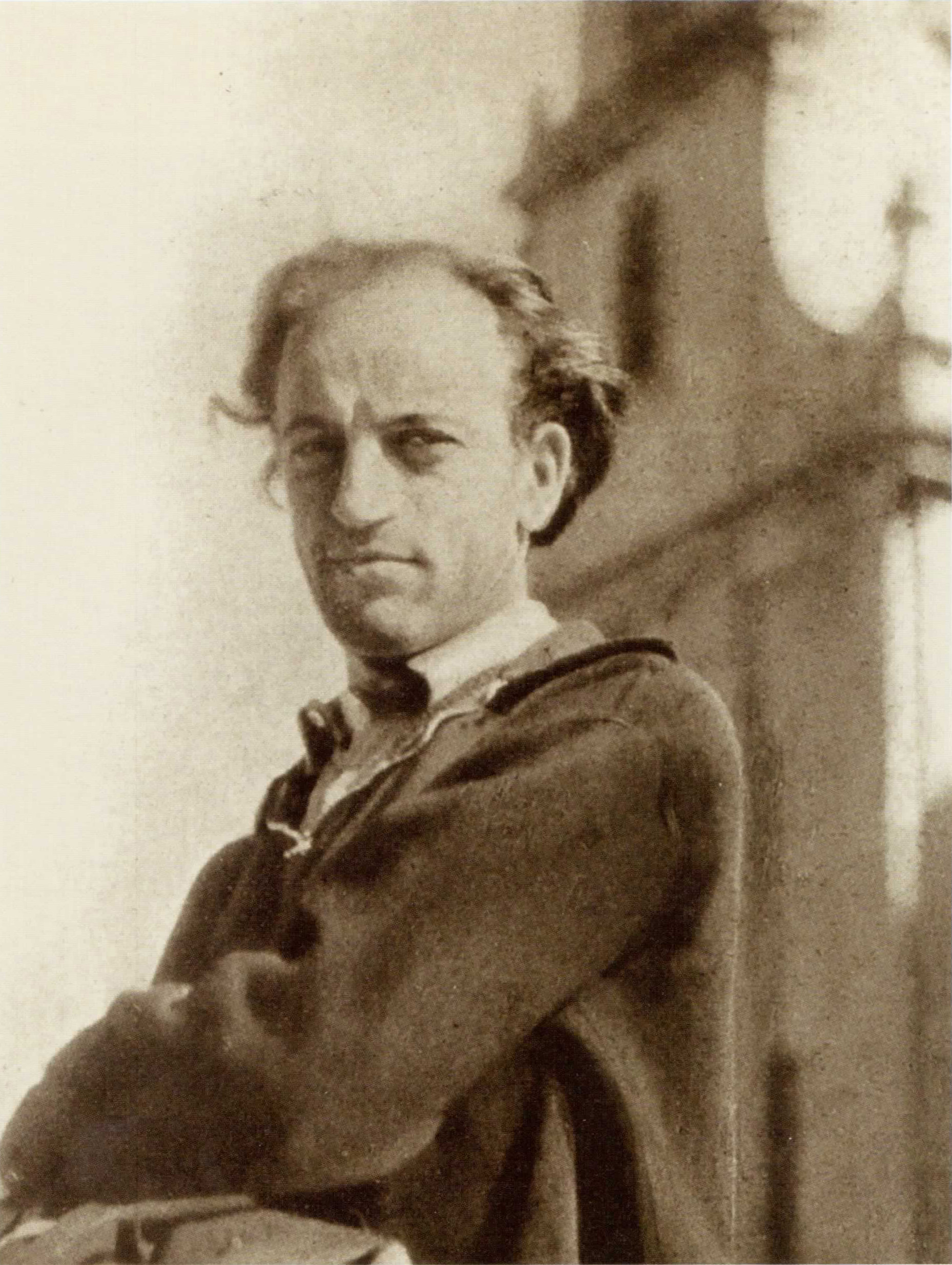
Lajos Vajda in Szentendre, 1939

== Artistic periods ==
=== Photomontages (1930–1933) ===
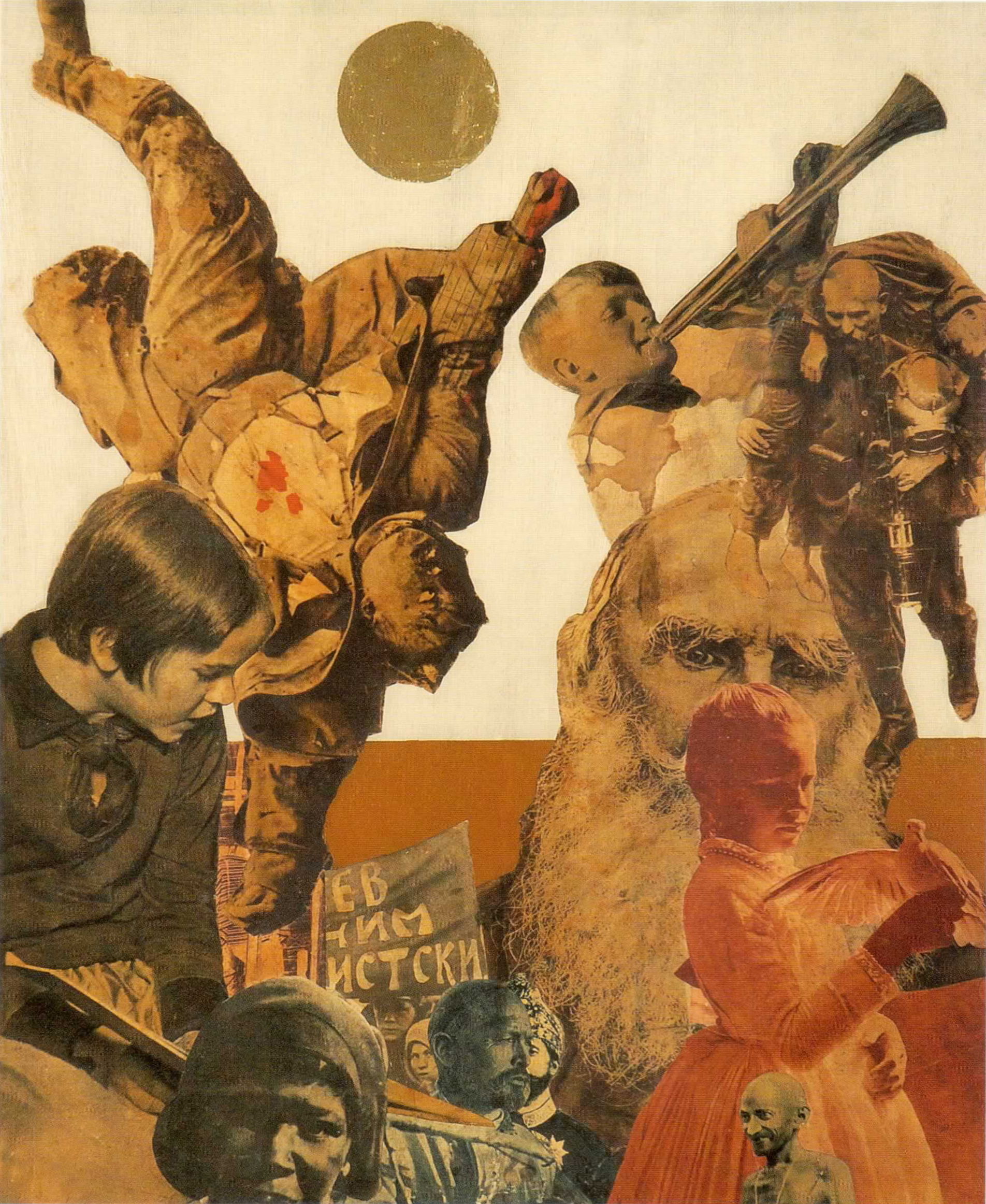
Tolstoy and Gandhi, 1930-33, photomontage, wooden plate

In this period Vajda regards film to be the most appropriate artistic genre for expressing new endeavors. He recognises the crucial role of modern film. (…) A film director who creates meaning in random events is capable of creating a new artistic worldview. This is the way Vajda approaches surrealism as a technique of creation. The photomontages made in Paris and later the stream of multi-layered drawing montages, collages and other compositions illustrate his artistic conviction: the problems of painting can be solved through ideas coming from the world of film.

In Vajda’s photomontages “the extreme forces of the human world appear in a dramatic simultaneity: dead babies and decrepit old men, knife and bread, rifle and bird, tiger and lily: the jungle laws of the struggle for survival and pure flowers are composed into one picture in diagonals of tension. These photomontages are completely different from the unreal Soviet propaganda montages of the age "with their monumental industrial machinery, dams and bridges".

The photomontages are “mostly characterized by confronting extremes. It's as if each of these montages shows us a drama condensed into a single image. Various details cut out from newspapers and picture magazines, juxtaposed on neutral cardboard, result in an unusual tension.

=== Still-Lifes (1934) ===
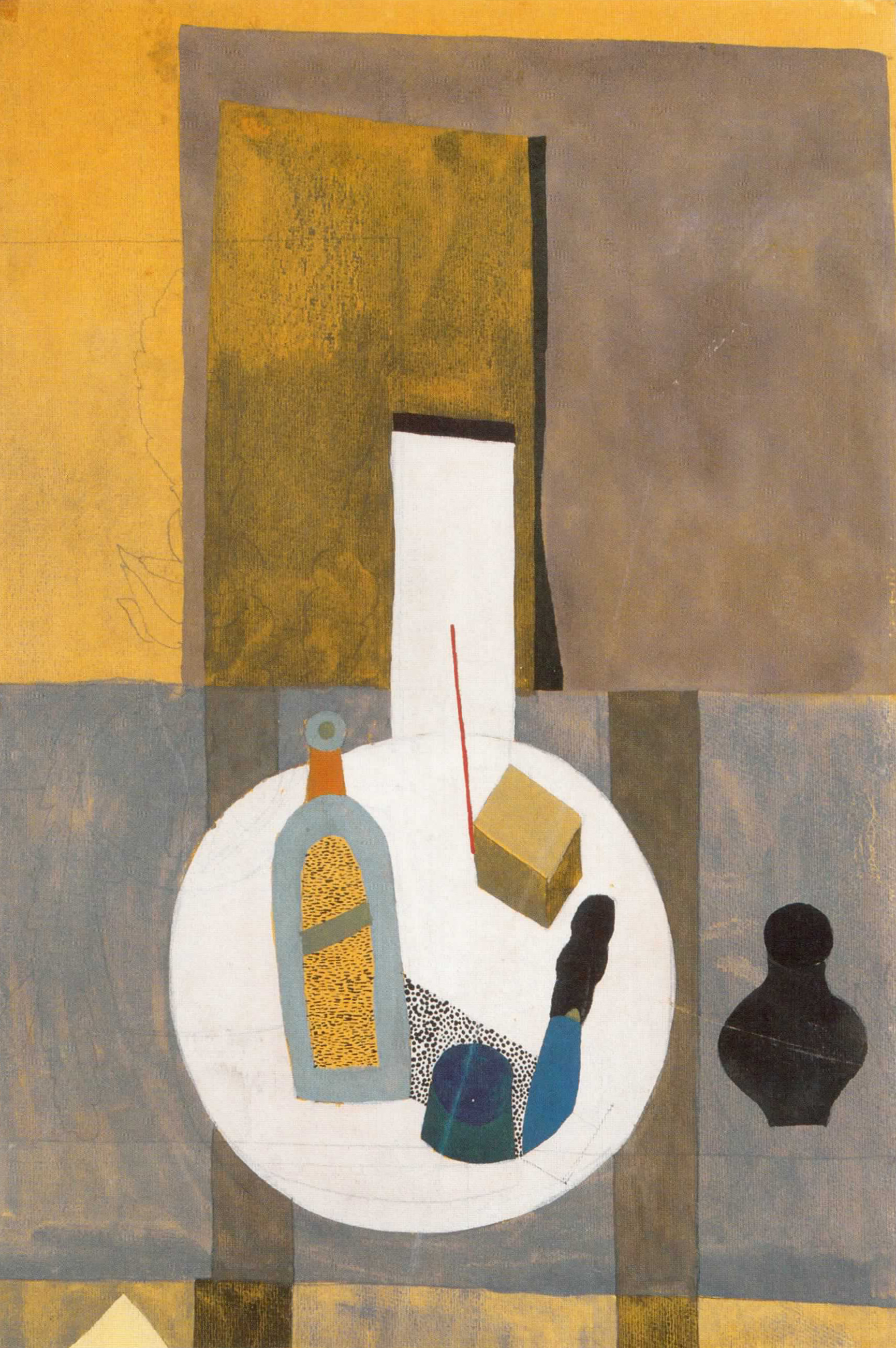
Still-Life on Pink Table, 1934, tempera, paper, 455×320 mm, Private Collection

"In all his still-lifes from 1934, Vajda benefits from the results of a cubist approach. He turns space into a plane. The "self-containedness" of the picture is so intimate that, instead of a still-life, we seem to be given a glimpse into a hermetically sealed world. Yet the painting's methodically constructed, compact unity exudes the harmony of life. This, apart from other factors, is also due to two compositional features. The first one is the simultaneous inclusion of all possible viewpoints of the topic, the second one is that the planes that form the background of the picture tend to be involuntarily lengthened in the imagination."

=== Line Drawings, Picture Montages (1935–1937) ===
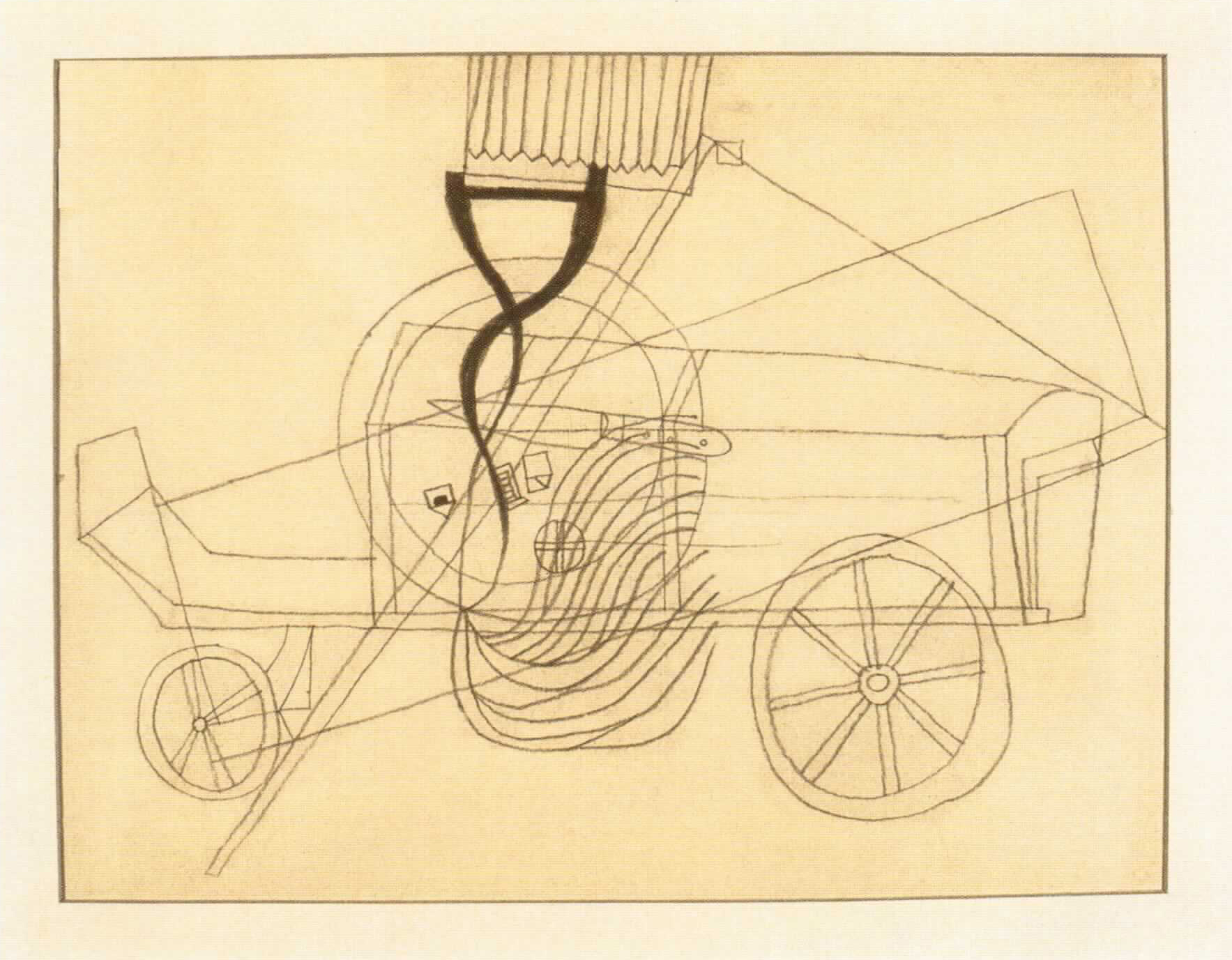
Still-Life with Cart, 1936, pencil, paper, 233×305 mm, Ferenczy Múzeum, Szentendre, Hungary

Returning to Hungary around 1935, Vajda started collecting motifs in Szentendre and its surroundings with his friend, Dezső Korniss. In addition to windows, house facades, gravestones, gate piers, he drew a kerosene lamp, a peasant's cart or a table with a knife, an apple and a loaf of bread on it. He was not so much interested in the origins of the motifs as in what they had become, what new meaning they had assumed within a particular location. At first, he drew the objects on the spot, later copying them onto each other. Sometimes he cut the drawings up and glued them together as a montage. Most of these pictures and drawings are composed in a circle, and all of them are without a concrete background.

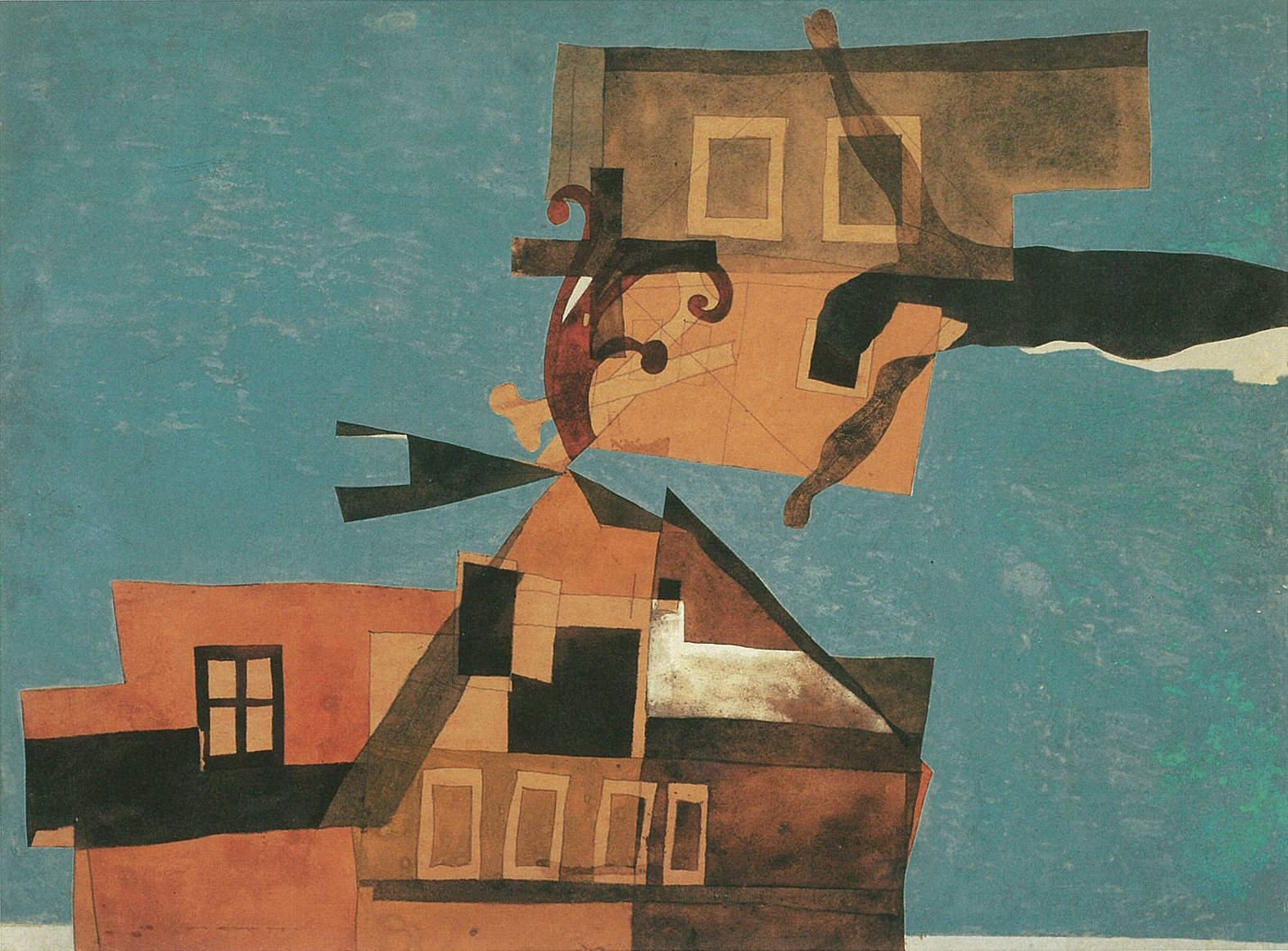
Houses at Szentendre with Crucifix, 1937, tempera collage, paper, 620×460 mm, Ferenczy Múzeum, Szentendre, Hungary

In a letter to his later wife, Júlia Richter, Lajos Vajda describes his ambitions in the period between 1935 and 1937.

"We tend to be less emotional in the picture (which, however, does not mean that we banish human feelings from it), and we prefer to put the main emphasis on constructiveness, on the spatial shaping of the picture, and therefore we look for the subjects that correspond to our approach; that is, we look for what is closed, what is a formally clean and round unity. Architectural, geometric things with or without human figures. The landscape is inorganic and therefore inappropriate for expressing what we have to say. I have now experimented with how different objects from different environments, assembled on a picture plane, have an effect (constructive surrealist sematics)."

The "constructive-surrealist sematics" quoted from the letter suggests that "Vajda really 'assembles' his motifs, stretching them onto the plane of the picture or creating an organic system out of them. The other element of the method, the surrealist approach, on the other hand, suggests that the individual elements fit together not only in terms of structure, but also along the lines of dreams and the free associations of images." His motifs form an organic order. His working method is as follows: he cuts out his drawings and pastes them on the picture according to his own composition method and then paints over the picture. On his motif-collecting tours in and around the city of Szentendre, Vajda uses a constructive surrealist method based on the principle of montage to combine everyday and sacral objects, simplified into symbols, with folk motifs, as in his painting Houses at Szentendre with Crucifix. Based on the summer drawings, Korniss developed the drawings in the studio with oil and gouache, Vajda with tempera. On 11 August 1936, Vajda wrote to Júlia Richter, mentioning his best friend at the time, Dezső Korniss: "Let us examine two persons. They were both born in 1908, in "what used to be Great" Hungary. Vajda of Jewish descent, a Hungarian, influenced by Serbian culture. Korniss: born in Transylvania. (...) Our aspirations are to develop a new art specific to East-Central Europe, relying on the French and Russian influences of the two great European cultural centres. Hungary's geographical position in Europe predestines it to be a link between the West (French art) and the East (Russian art). We want to fuse together what is culturally (and in the visual arts) the artistic expression of the two types of people at these two poles: we want to be bridge-builders.

=== Icons (1936) ===
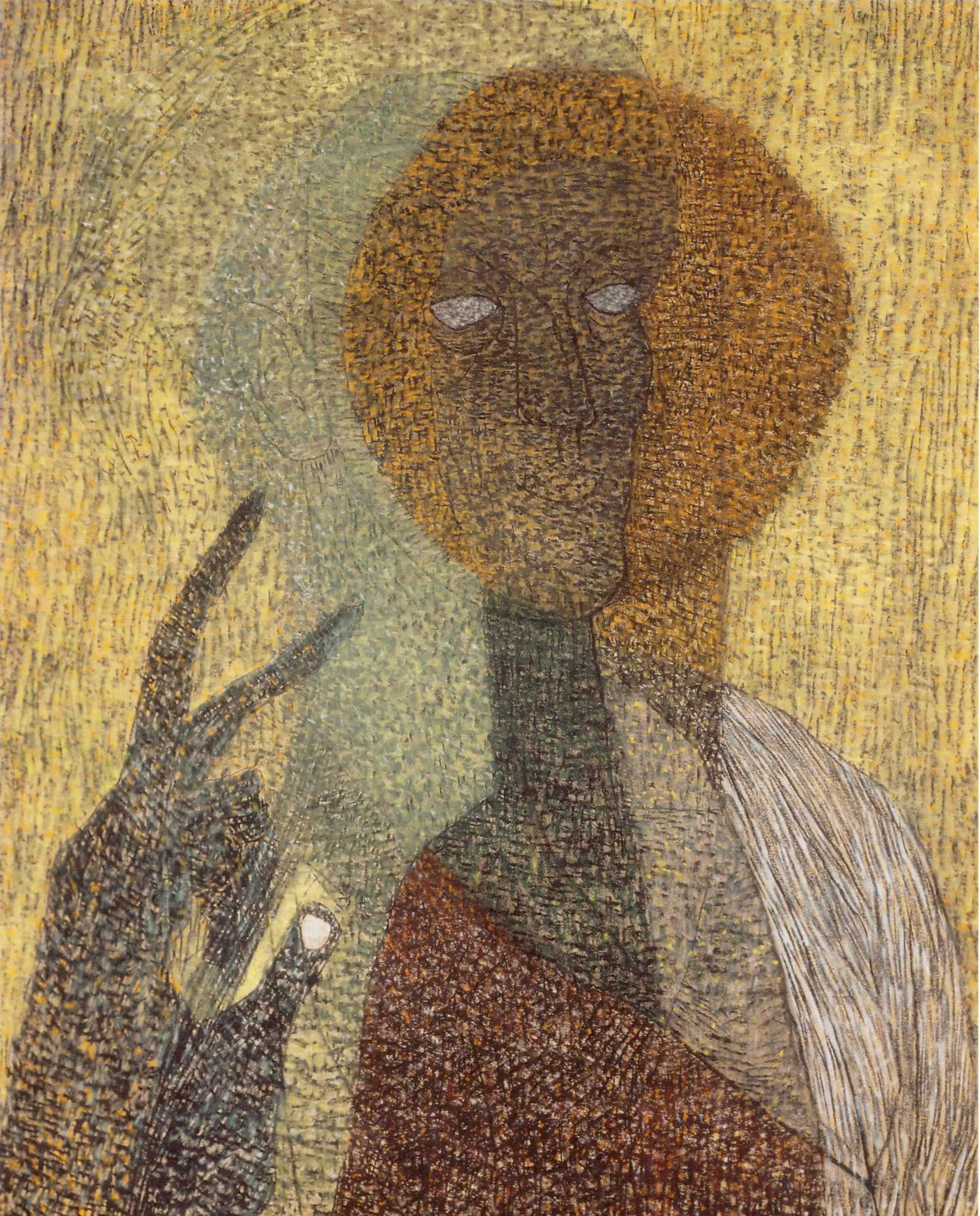
Self-Portrait with Icon and Upward Pointing Hand 1936, pastel, coal, paper, The Gábor Kovács Arts Foundation, Budapest

Through a series of self-portrait icons, Lajos Vajda attempts to reconcile the individual and the communal forces, and the worldly and transcendent spheres. Self-Portrait with Icon and Upward Pointing Hand is the artist's most important masterpiece. (The title of the picture was not given by the painter.)

We see two faces in the picture: a face showing the artist’s personal features and a spherical head. From the interpenetration of the self-portrait and the spherical head, a “third” portrait may emerge that has a “new message”. “This third portrait shows a head looking to the left consisting of the aura-radiating spherical head's arc and the eyes and nose-line of the personal self-portrait. Thus arises the “genuine face”, “the face of Man” uniting individual and accidental features with the divine icon's spherical head." Other interpretations are also possible.)

"This triple portrait, formed from a multitude of dynamically flowing pastel patches, allows for multiple interpretations. In addition to the obvious identification whereby the first portrait is the individual, the faceless sphere is the universal, and the third image is the community sphere, the individual image can be seen as the representative of the body, the icon as the representative of the spirit, and the face resulting from the synthesis of the two as the representative of the soul. Nikolai Berdyaev, a Russian Orthodox Christian philosopher, speaks of the icon as the expression of the relationship of the God-man that emerges from the two-way relationship between man and God. (...) In the portrait that emerged from the interpenetration of human and divine imagery, Vajda presented his 'true', definitive self-portrait of himself, the face of the artist who, through the power of art, could enter into a relationship with God, with the transcendent world beyond the tangible."

=== Masks (1938) ===
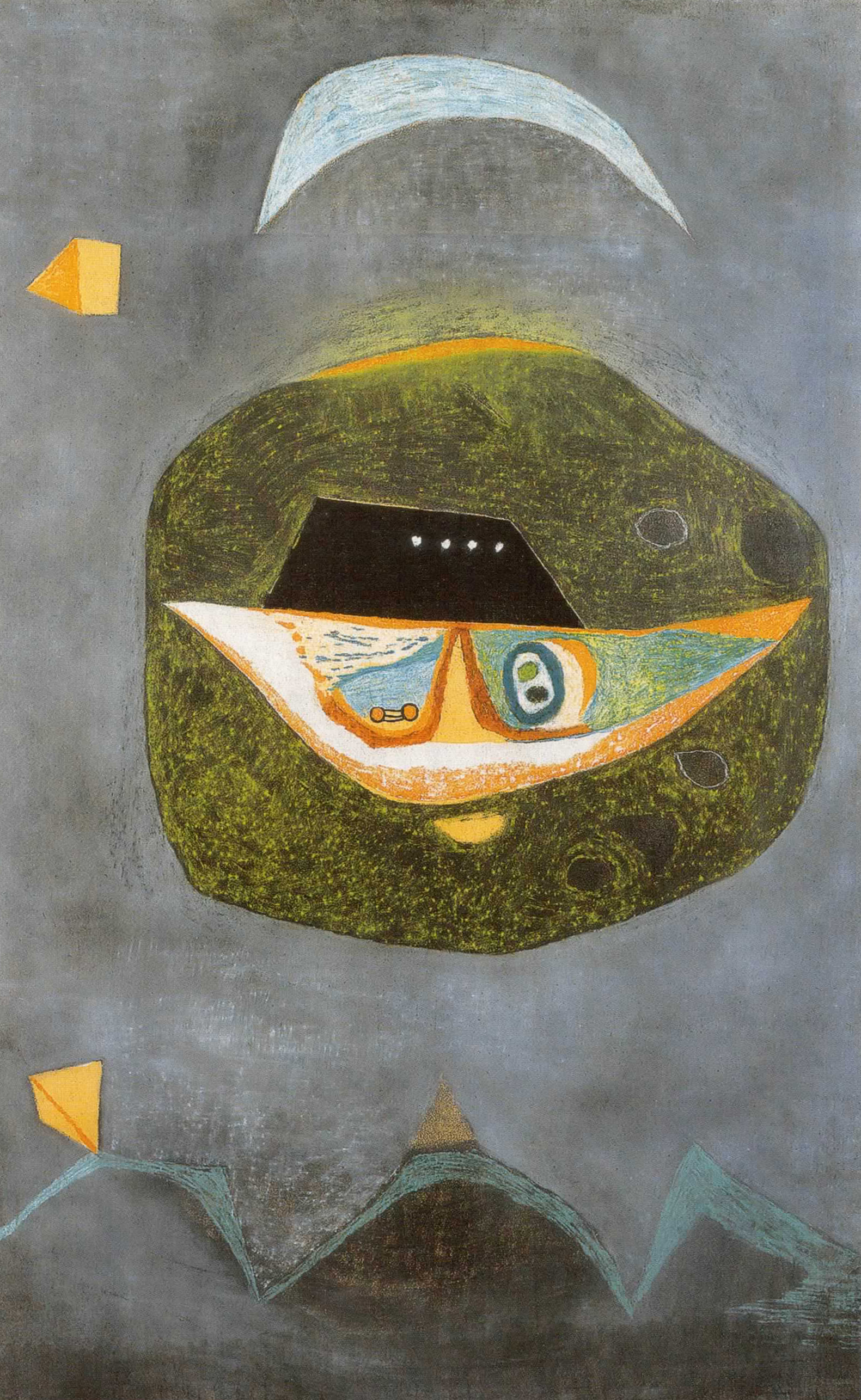
Mask with Moon,1938, pastel, paper, 860×600 mm, Szombathelyi Képtár, Hungary

Dark clouds loom on the horizon of Vajda's art. The possibility of achieving a synthesis disappears under the threat of fascism and Stalinism. Vajda, rejecting both fascist and Stalinist ideology, embarked on a path of personal religiosity.

From 1938 onwards, the Szentendre scenery disappears from his art. Its place is taken by strange, alien landscapes with frightening, sometimes strange masks or creatures combined with masks. Most of these works were done in pastel, and Vajda took full advantage of the possibilities offered by pastel. Later, the nature of the masks changes. The masks don't express anxieties and fears anymore, but they transport the viewer into another dimension. They all float into each other, transforming into a dreamlike turmoil, but they already anticipate the next stage in the development of Vajda's art.

=== Imaginary Landscapes and Creatures (1938-1939) ===
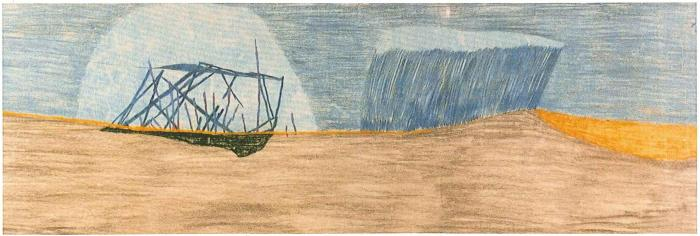
Northern Landscape, 1938, pastel, coal, paper, 290×880 mm, private collection

"One of Vajda's major works from this period is the masterpiece titled Northern Landscape. The plane, divided into cold blue and brown surfaces, is divided only by shapes resembling icebergs and a shipwreck. No one since Caspar David Friedrich, one of the most brilliant representatives of German Romanticism, has been able to express with such poignant power the fragility of man's existence; man confronted with the emptiness of space and the boundlessness of nature, and also the vulnerability of man in the face of nature."

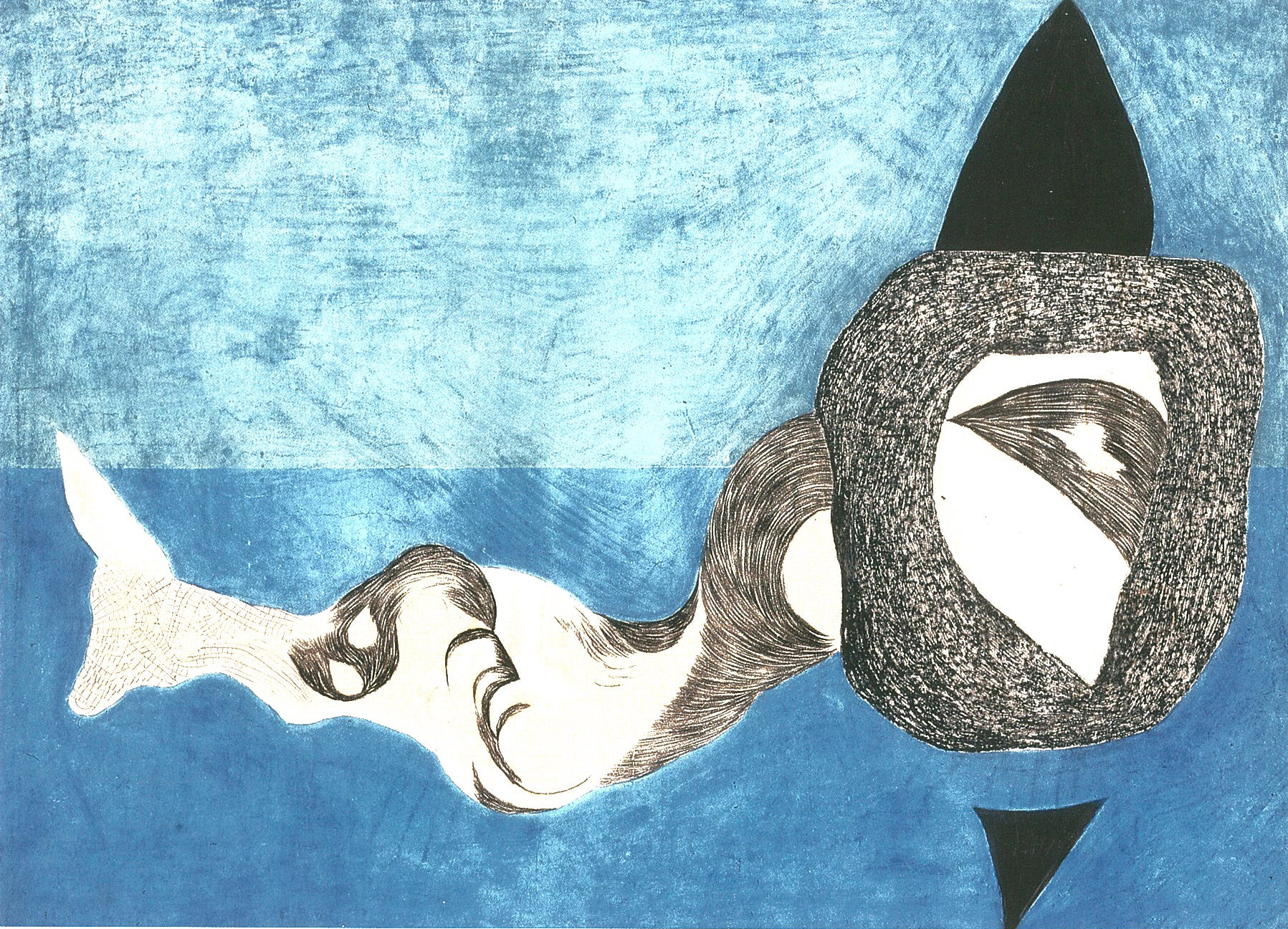
Monster in Blue Space, 1939, pastel, pencil, water paint, paper, Janus Pannonius Múzeum, Pécs, Hungary

=== Charcoal Drawings of the Last Year (1940) ===
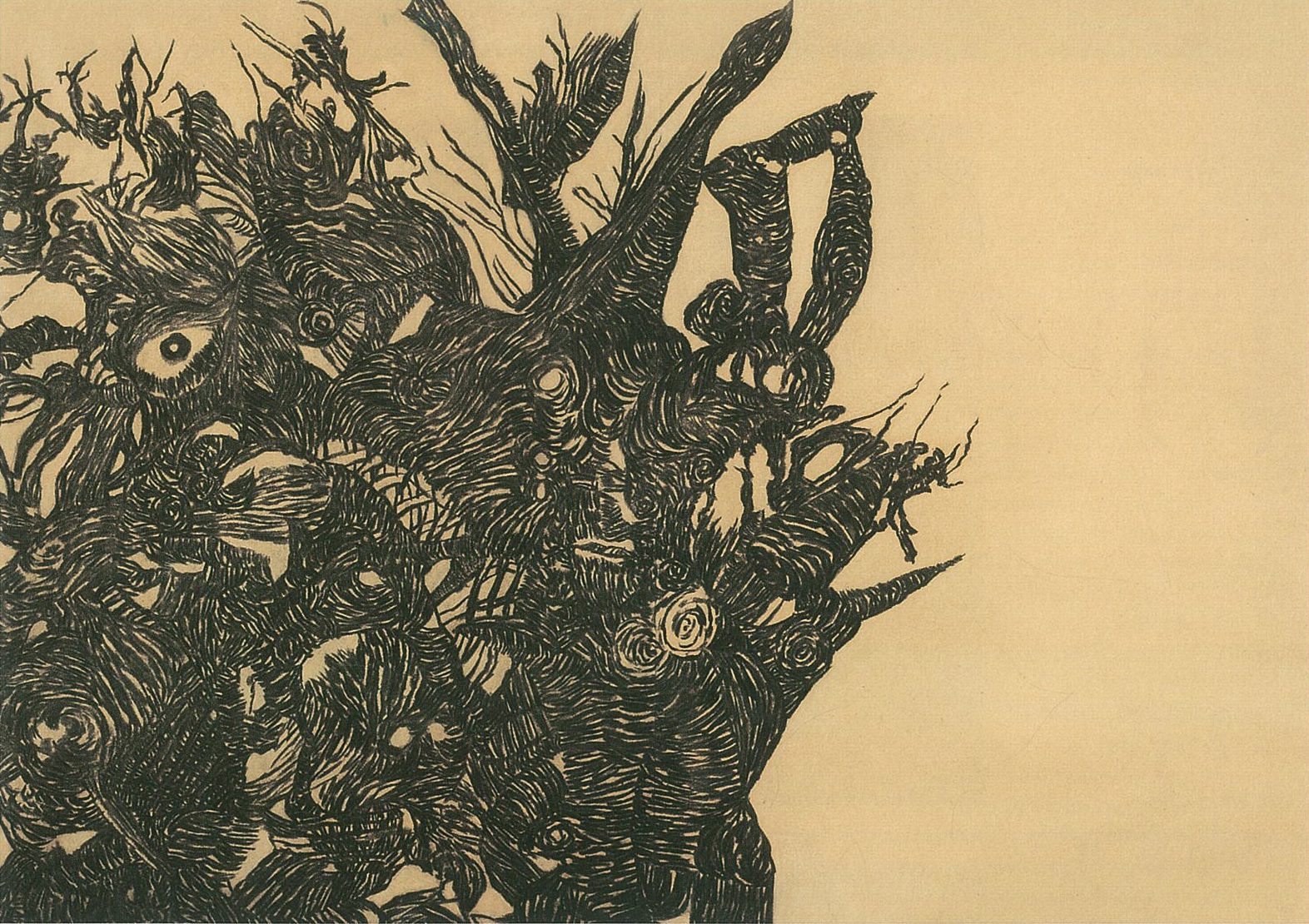
Ancient Vegetation, 1940, coal, paper, 900×1260 mm, Ferenczy Museum, Szentendre, Hungary

Despite his worsening illness,\Vajda works through the summer of 1940, but he suspects that his journey has come to an end. The flawless, charcoal-engraved forms, now yellowed to the bone, which pop up on large sheets of wrapping paper, have the weight of a vision. These flaming, fluttering shapes enter the internal self with the insistence of an afterimage of looking into the sun, exuding unease and ecstatic anxiety. There was every reason for this anxiety. On the one hand, there is the personal fate of Vajda himself: his increasingly hopeless struggle with his illness, with the shadow of an unwanted and feared death. On the other hand, there is the reality of the world war, which in the eyes of Vajda (and of many other European artists) becomes the tragedy of a civilisation that is based on humanist values and cultural traditions.

== Solo exhibitions ==
- 1937 Studio Exhibition at the studio of Imre Ámos
- 1940 Studio Exhibition at the studio of Gusztáv Seiden
- 1943 Vajda Lajos festőművész emlékkiállítása (Memorial Exhibition of Lajos Vajda), Alkotás Művészház, 1943 October, Budapest. Catalogue introduction by Ernő Kállai Curator: Béla Fekete
- 1947 Az Európai Iskola 26. kiállítása. Vajda Lajos képei. 1947. szeptember 28--október 12. (The 26th Exhibition of the European School Pictures by Lajos Vajda, from 28 September to 12 October), Budapest, Catalogue by Árpád Mezei. Curator: Pál Kiss
- 1962 Galerie Lambert, Paris
- 1966 Vajda Lajos emlékkiállítása (Retrospective Memorial Exhibition), Szentendre, Ferenczy Károly Múzeum, Curated by Krisztina Passuth.
- 1968 Exhibition of Lajos Vajda, Galerie P. Facchetti, Paris
- 1969 Vajda Lajos emlékkiállítás ( Memorial Exhibition of Lajos Vajda), Székesfehérvár, Szt. István Király Múzeum, from September 14 to 2 November 2, Curators: Éva Körner and Márta Kovalovszky
- 1973 Lajos Vajda, Catalogue of the Paul Facchetti Gallery, Zürich, catalogue by Jeanne Facchetti
- 1978 Vajda Lajos Emlékkiállítása. Magyar Nemzeti Galéria, 1978. július-szeptember (The Memorial Exhibition of Lajos Vajda at the Hungarian National Gallery, 1978 July–September ), Budapest, (Curator and catalogue author: Lenke Haulisch.)
- 1983 Vajda Lajos (1908-1941) emlékkiállítás (Lajos Vajda /1908-1941/ Memorial Exhibition), Zalaegerszeg, Cataloge and curation: Péter György, Gábor Pataki, József Sárkány & with a study by Árpád Mezei.
- 2001 Vajda Lajos: rejtett kincsek IX. : a pécsi Művészetek Háza kiállítás-sorozata : Vajda Lajos művei egy magángyűjteményből (Lajos Vajda: Hidden Treasures No. IX: Exhibition series of the House Arts of Pécs, Hungary: Lajos Vajda's Works from a Private Collection) Introduced by Gábor Pataki.
- 2006, Conditio Humana–Lajos Vajda–Self-Portraits Vienna, Archbishop's Cathedral and Diocesan Museum
- 2008 Vajda Lajos (1908-1941) kiállítása az MNG és az Erdész Galéria közös rendezésében (Lajos Vajda /1908-1941/ The Joint Exhibition of the Hungarian National Gallery and the Révész Gallery of Szentendre), Budapest, from 12 December to 22 February 2009, Curators: Gábor Pataki and Mariann Gergely
- 2009 Touch of Depths (Lajos Vajda), Hungarian Cultural Centre, Brussels, ed. by György Petőcz; foreword by Greta Van Broeckhoven, Paul Huvenne; texts by Endre Bálint [et al.]; comments by Gábor Bíró [et al.]
- 2009 Lajos Vajda, Katzen Arts Center, Washington D.C.
- 2018 Világok között / Vajda Lajos (Among Worlds / The Art of Lajos Vajda), Ferenczy Múzeum, Szentendre, Hungary, from 11 November 2018 to 31 March 2019

== Group exhibitions ==
- 1948 Az Európai Iskola 32. kiállítása. "Elődeink", (The 32nd Exhibition of the European School. "Our Ancestors") 1948 Catalogue author and curator: Pál Kiss
- 1958 Peintres Hongrois, Lajos Vajda, Lajos Szabó, André Bálint, Attila Kotányi, Lyubomir Szabó, Centre for Fine Arts of Brussels
- 1967 Twentieth Century Hungarian Art, The Arts Council of Great Britain at the Royal Institute Gallery, May, London, catalogue by István Genthon
- 1971 Castle Museum, Norwich
- 1972 Museum am Oswall, Dortmund
- 1972 Galerie Schlegel, Zürich
- 1972 Art Museum, Indiana University
- 1975 Kunsthaus, Luzern
- 1976 Biennale, Venice

== Select bibliography ==
- Vajda Lajos festőművész emlékkiállítása: katalógus, Kállai Ernő előszavával, (The Memorial Exhibition of Lajos Vajda), Introduction by Ernő Kállai, Alkotás Művészház, 1943
- Stefánia Mándy: Vajda Lajos (1908-1941), Képzőművészeti Alap Kiadóvállalata, 1964
- Stefánia Mándy: Vajda Lajos (1908-1941), Corvina Kiadó Vállalat, 1971
- Dévényi István (ed): Vajda Lajos Emékkönyv, Magvető Könyvkiadó, Budapest, 1972
- Karátson Gábor: Leonardo, Grünewald, Vajda Lajos, Magvető Kiadó, Budapest, 1975
- Gábor Pataki: "1937: Vajda Lajos konstruktív szürrealizmusának átalakulása” (The Year 1937: The Transformation of Lajos Vajda’s Constructive Surrealism), Ars Hungarica, 1988, No. 1
- Péter György-Gábor Pataki-Sárkány József: Vajda Lajos (1921-1941), emlékkiállítás, (Memorial Exhibition of Lajos Vajda), Zalagerszeg, 1983, exhibition cat
- Stefánia Mándy: Vajda Lajos, Corvina, Budapest, 1983
- Stefánia Mándy: " Gedő Ilka esszéjének előtörtörténetéhez–Reflexiók, 1954" (On the Antecedents of Ilka Gedő's Essay on Vajda–Reflections, 1954) Holmi December, 1990, pp. 1340–1342
- Gyula Kozák (ed): Vajda Lajos levelei feleségéhez, Vajda Júliához, 1936-1941, (Lajos Vajda’s Letters to His Wife, Júlia Vajda, 1936-1941), Szentendre, 1996
- Gedő Ilka: "Vajda Lajosról" (On Lajos Vajda) Holmi, 1990, pp. 1343–1353 June 2009, pp. 1343–1353
- Biró Gábor: "Emlékek és jegyzetek Vajda Lajosról, 1954" (Memories and Notes on Lajos Vajda) Published by: Eszter Bíró Holmi, June 2009. pp. 804–812
- Gábor Pataki: „Vajda Lajos: Felmutató ikonos önarckép” (Lajos Vajda: Self-Portrait with Icon and Upward Pointing Hand), Ars Hungarica, 2000, No. 1
- György Petőcz (eds): Lajos Vajda–Touch of Depths published for the Hungarian Culture Brussels and by Balassi Publishing House, Budapest, 2002, Texts by Endre Bálint, Gábor Biró, Gyula Kozák, Krisztina Passuth and Júlia Vajda
- Gábor Pataki: Vajda Lajos, Kossuth Kiadó, Budapest, 2009
- György Petőcz - Noémi Szabó (ed.) : Világok között / Vajda Lajos, (Between Worlds / Lajos Vajda), Ferenczy Múzeumi Centrum, Szentendre, 2018
