= Borota =

- Municipality
- Coat of arms

- Map showing Borota in Hungary
- Coordinates: 46°16′00″N 19°14′00″E
- Country: Hungary
- County: Bács-Kiskun

Government
  - Type: Mayor-council government
  - Mayor: Ferencné Mikó (Ind.)

Area
  - Total: 81.8 km^{2} (31.6 sq mi)

Population (2018)
  - Total: 1,309
  - Density: 16.0/km^{2} (41.4/sq mi)
- Time zone: UTC+1 (CET)
  - Summer (DST): UTC+2 (CEST)
- Postal code: 6445
- Area code: 77
- Geocode: 19327

Historical population
Year	Pop.	±%
1961	3,684	—
1971	2,680	−27.3%
1981	2,149	−19.8%
1991	1,743	−18.9%
2001	1,592	−8.7%
2011	1,409	−11.5%
2018	1,309	−7.1%
Source: Eurostat

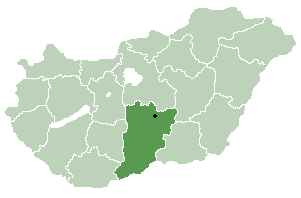
Location of Bács-Kiskun county in Hungary

Borota is a village and municipality (Hungarian: község) in Bács-Kiskun county, located in the Southern Great Plain region of Hungary.

== Geography ==
It covers an area of 81.8 km^{2} (32 sq mi) and had a population of 1,309 people as of 2018.

== History ==
Borota was mentioned in 1325 as Boroth and it was property of the archbishop of Kalocsa. Since the village had been devastated by the Mongol invasion of 1241–42, the archbishop sold the village to Imre Becsey who brought new settlers to Borota. In the 16th century Borota fell under Ottoman occupation and was mentioned several times in Turkish records. In 1658 Palatine Ferenc Wesselényi donated the village to Baron Pál Serényi. In 1740 Borota was in the hands of the Princes Grassalkovich. However, they divided the estate into plots and sold it to the Cseszneky family. Since 1750 Borota belonged to Rém village, but its southern part known as Szentkáta remained the property of the Counts Cseszneky de Milvány until the 20th century. In the second half of the 19th century Borota was an independent village for a short while, then administered again by Rém. In 1911 eventually regained its administrative independence.

== Demographics ==
In the 2011 census, the municipality had a population of 1,443 individuals, with 82.7% of the population reporting to be Hungarian, 1.2% German, 0.4% Roma, 0.4% Romanian and 17.2% declining to answer. The majority of the population were adherents of Roman Catholicism (62%), with 28.7% declining to answer and 6.4% following no religion.
