= Okiie Hashimoto =

Japanese artist and educator

Okiie Hashimoto (橋本興家, Hashimoto Okiie, IPA: [o.ki:.e], 1899–1993) was a Japanese artist and educator. Best known as part of the postwar revival of the sōsaku-hanga (Creative Prints) movement, he began his career as a school art teacher. In 1936, he began creating woodblock prints after he attended a workshop organized by prominent sōsaku-hanga artist Un’ichi Hiratsuka and began creating woodblock prints, which he successfully entered at major salon-style exhibitions in 1937. In 1939, he joined the newly formed First Thursday Society (Ishimoku-kai, 一木会), which gathered around Kōshirō Onchi, who would become a leading figure in the postwar Creative Prints movement.

In his prolific career in printmaking, he was known for an innovative use of simplified and decorative forms that exude a modern feel. He was interested in expressing the effects of light as much as carefully controlled geometry in composition and forms. Although Hashimoto portrayed diverse subjects, including flowers and figures in his late years, he preferred to work on Japanese architectures and gardens, partly in order to memorialize rapidly disappearing castles.

In his lifetime, his achievements were rewarded with his appointment to the president of the Japan Print Association (1974–79) and his invitations to the prestigious international prints biennales in Tokyo (1957, 1970, 1972) and Lugano (1972).

== Education and teaching career ==
Born on October 4, 1899, in Yazu, Tottori Prefecture, Hashimoto graduated from Tottori Prefectural Normal School in 1920 and briefly worked as a primary school teacher. In 1921, he began a three-year teacher's training course at the Tokyo School of Fine Arts (the present Tokyo University of the Arts), graduating in 1924. In Tokyo, aside from the art teacher education courses, he received training in a wide variety of practices, including yōga (Western-style painting), nihonga (Japanese-style painting), sculpture, design, etching and lithography, crafts, and calligraphy. Following his graduation, Hashimoto worked as an art teacher at both the university and at the first girls' school in Tokyo until 1955, when he began to pursue a career as an artist full-time.

== Career as an artist ==
In 1936, Hashimoto attended a workshop organized by prominent sōsaku-hanga artist Un’ichi Hiratsuka. He remained a close friend of Hiratsuka throughout his life. Among the various mediums he studied, Hashimoto found printmaking particularly special and from then onward seriously pursued the practice. He once stated, "Printmaking suits me. [...] I like the resistance that the block gives me. [...] The whole process of making a print is hard work—it's hard but satisfying."

In 1939, Hashimoto became a member of the newly formed First Thursday Society (Ishimoku-kai, 一木会), so called because the group members assembled on the first Thursday of every month. Gathered around renowned printmaker Kōshirō Onchi, this group is credited for the postwar revival of sōsaku-hanga. Hashimoto first exhibited with the Japan Print Association in 1937 and continued to practice and exhibit at a number of national and international exhibitions throughout the remainder of his life, becoming president of the Japan Print Association in 1974. Hashimoto contributed a landscape design to the group's sixth and final portfolio, Ichimokushū (First Thursday Collection: 一木集), in 1950.

With his simplified and decorative style, his works were received as “a new breath into the long tradition of woodblock printmaking." His woodblock designs exude a modern feel. His interest in “the effect of dappled light on the perception of forms” is observed in his 1965 work Shokei, Katsura (Short Path, Katsura; 小径 桂). His fascination with Japanese rock gardens was translated into “a carefully controlled geometry of parallel lines and faceted rocks," which "imbue[d] the composition with a stillness and contemplative mood”, as in his 1958 work Seijaku (Sunaba II) (Tranquility (Sand Garden II); 静寂(砂庭II), coll. British Museum). As for influences, Hashimoto cited Hiratsuka, Henri Matisse, André Derain, Maurice de Vlaminck, Kanji Maeda, and Masao Maeda among others.

Although Hashimoto portrayed diverse subjects, including flowers and figures in his late years, he preferred Japanese architecture and gardens. Of his favorite subject, Japanese castles, he once related to Oliver Statler, “I like architectural detail, and I have a special feeling for old stone walls. It's tragic how fast the castles are disappearing. I'd like to make a series of prints of some of the great ones at various times of the day so that people in the future will have some idea [of] what they looked like. They're important to Japan and important to me." Two of his 1944 publications from Katō Hanga Kenkyūjo (Kato Prints Research Institute) focus on Japanese castles: one is a printed book, Nihon no shiro (Japanese castles; 日本の城), and the other is a portfolio, Kojō jukkei (Ten views of old castles; 古城十景). His continuing engagement with this subject was subsequently compiled in his 1978 book, Hashimoto Okiie Nihon no shiro zen hangashū (A complete woodblocks of Japanese castles by Hashimoto Okiie).

In addition to holding several solo exhibitions, Hashimoto exhibited in group exhibitions nationally and internationally, with his exhibition history including his participation in the International Biennial Exhibition of Prints in Tokyo (1957, 1970, 1972) and the Mostra Internationale di Bianco e Nero Lugano (1972).

== Later activities and legacy ==
As Hashimoto continued to work as a print artist, his role as an educator was recognized through his appointment to committees that researched and reviewed school textbooks for the national and Tokyo Metropolitan governments. In 1953, he published Atarashii hanga no michibikikata (New ways to teach printmaking: 新しい版画の導き方) with Bijutsu Shuppan-sha, under the auspice of UNESCO.

He died at the age of 93 in Tokyo on August 18, 1993.

== Collections ==
Several of Hashimoto's prints are held in the permanent collection of the British Museum, the Harvard Art Museums, the Philadelphia Museum of Art, the Nihon no Hanga Museum in Amsterdam, the Suzaka Hanga Museum in Nagano, the Ehime Museum of Art, and the Tottori Prefectural Museum. among other venues.
