= Kitaoka Fumio =

Japanese artist

Kitaoka Fumio (北岡 文雄, 1918 – April 23, 2007) was a Japanese artist. He was trained in oil painting, and later became interested in woodblock printing.

== Biography ==
Born in Tokyo in 1918, Kitaoka studied oil painting with Fujishima Takeji at the Tokyo School of Fine Arts from 1936 to 1941. In his third and fourth years, he was instructed in woodblock printing by Un'ichi Hiratsuka. Following his graduation he worked as an art teacher in Tokyo, until 1945, when he was sent to occupied Manchuria to work with the Japanese government's Northeast Asia Culture Development Society. While in Manchuria, he became interested in contemporary social-realist Chinese monochrome prints, and was inspired to create his 1947 print series Sōkokue no tabi ("Repatriation"), chronicling his difficult journey home to Japan.

After his return, he began to attend evening classes with the influential Sōsaku-hanga artist Kōshirō Onchi, and joined his group, the First Thursday Society (一木会, Ichimokukai). The Sōsaku-hanga movement advocated artistic creation as originating from the self, and promoted expressing emotions through woodblock print art. At this time, Kitaoka virtually gave up oil painting to focus on woodblock printing, contributing prints to the First Thursday Society's publication in 1947 and 1948, and his 1949 print series The Face of Tokyo, five portfolios of prints documenting post-war Japan.

In 1955, he moved to Paris to study wood engraving at the École des Beaux Arts, and then to the United States in 1964–5 to teach at the Minneapolis School of Art, and the Pratt Institute in Brooklyn, New York. He served as Director of the Japanese Artists Association, and was named an honorary member of the Japan Print Association. Kitaoka died on April 23, 2007, of pneumonia.

== Style and technique ==
Kitaoka explored both realistic and abstract styles, finally settling later in life on a style that embraced both realism and abstraction in brightly colored landscapes.
