= Masao Maeda =

Japanese woodblock print artist

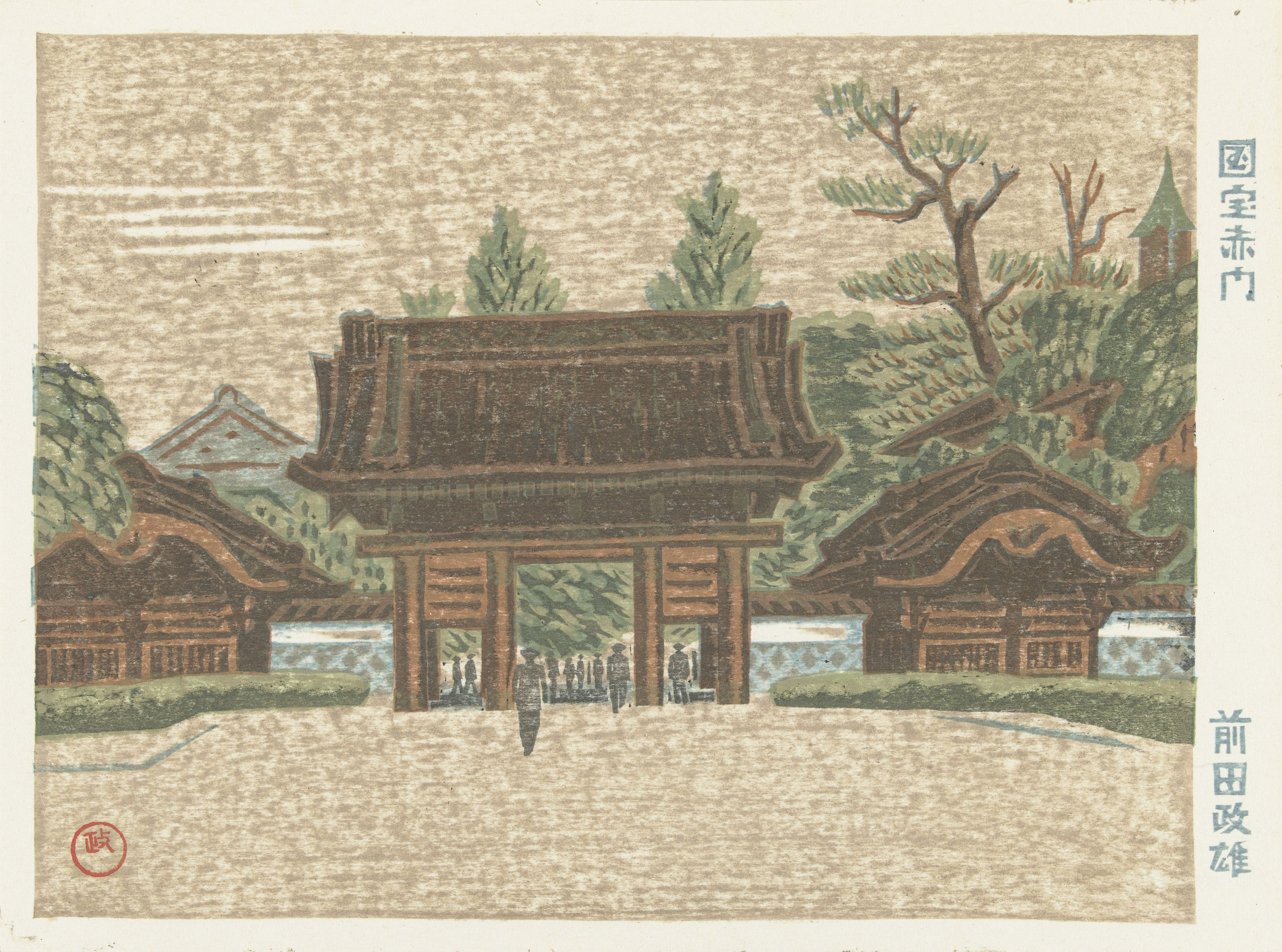
Red Gate at Imperial University from the series Scenes of Last Tokyo, Maeda Masao, 1945

Masao Maeda (前田 政雄, Maeda Masao; December, 1904 - March 27, 1974) was a woodblock print artist, born in Hakodate on the island of Hokkaidō, Japan.

In 1923 Maeda met Hiratsuka Un'ichi, a leader of the sosaku-hanga "creative prints" movement. In 1925 he relocated to Tokyo and joined the Kawabata Painting School. He studied Western-style painting (Yōga) with Umehara Ryuzauro and started work in oils. He learned woodblock techniques via his association with the Yoyogi Group of print artists who met at Hiratsuka's house in the 1930s, and by 1940 Maeda was solely working as a printmaker.

In 1923, when a group of Tokyo artists exhibited in Hakodate, Maeda first met Un'ichi Hiratsuka, a leader of the sosaku-hanga movement. In 1925 he relocated to Tokyo and joined the Kawabata Ga-Gakko, a private painting school founded in 1909 by the naturalist shijo-style artist Kawabata Gyokushō, but left it after two years, dissatisfied with its teaching methods. He continued studying Western-style painting (Yōga) with Ryūzaburō Umehara, exhibiting his oils as early as 1927, before gradually turning to woodblock printing and joining the Kokugakai, where he helped Hiratsuka manage the association's hanga section and curated exhibitions of modern hanga. Having settled in Tokyo, Maeda found himself living near Hiratsuka by chance, and came to know him more closely through the Kokugakai. In the 1930s he also joined the Yoyogi Group of print artists who met at Hiratsuka's house, where, together with Azechi and Shimozawa, he became his informal student; Hiratsuka's influence on him was immense, especially in his manner of carving and printing from the block and in rendering light and dark values. Maeda often visited Hiratsuka's home, grateful always to be treated as one of the family, and would stay long hours watching him carve from morning to evening, silently absorbing his technique. By 1940 Maeda was solely working as a printmaker.

Maeda joined the Ichimoku-kai1 (First Thursday Society), a sosaku-hanga group led by Onchi Koshiro, whom he greatly admired, though Onchi's influence on him proved only transitory: over the years Maeda returned increasingly to traditional Japanese subjects and values. Even so, Onchi's teachings surface throughout Maeda's work in the cleanliness and quality of his woodblock printing and in his full absorption of the idea of artistic and expressive freedom, although, unlike Onchi, Maeda never experimented with unconventional materials. He repeatedly tried etching and lithography, but only for personal experimentation; much as he admired Onchi's ideas, he found he could not get away from wood, which he considered a material well suited to the Japanese character. He contributed to One Hundred New Views of Japan in 1940, the two Kitsutsuki Hanga-shu collections (1942-3) and nos 3-6 of the Ichimokushu collections (1947-50), his final contribution to the latter being the small print Komagatake, depicting the volcano of the same name in Hokkaido; in this small square woodcut, which conveys the rugged terrain of the 1,128-metre mountain with remarkable economy, Maeda relied on simple forms and shading, with extensive texture across the mountain, sky and clouds, the sharply diagonal peak given an unsettling profile by two plumes of steam and gas rising from its centre-right, while the dark brown foreground is dotted with lively black calligraphic strokes representing tree branches. He also contributed the print Kokuhō Akamon to Tokyo Kaiko Zue (Scenes of Lost Tokyo) (1945), a straightforward rendering of the historic Akamon gate, part of the former Tokyo Imperial University campus and today designated a National Treasure, showing the gate flanked by its two guardhouses with pedestrians crossing through the open doors on either side of the central portal, as well as to Nihon Minzoku Zufu (1946), which quickly established his reputation among fellow artists for his skill in carving and printing.

== Style ==
At first Maeda's work relied fundamentally on line, but as his style evolved, more massive forms, often without key-block outlines, appeared alongside denser and more vivid colours; he also frequently used cardboard blocks for shading. Landscapes proved to be his preferred subject, though he occasionally also produced figure studies and still lifes, in which the influence of nihonga painting atypically surfaces, a result of his earlier training in oils, shijō-style painting and yōga. He also produced several mountain prints, including Asai Haru Togakushi and Tachimachi Misaki, in styles and techniques similar to Azechi's, though Maeda was not an avid mountaineer as Azechi was: while Azechi always sought to reach the summit, Maeda would stop halfway to sketch, arguing that the finest views were found exactly midway up a peak, giving the viewer the sensation of being suspended in between, and able to reach the summit truly only with the eye. His style was influenced by his early teacher Umehara, but also by Maekawa, Onchi, Renoir, Matisse and Braque: the vivid colour palette of his fishing-village scenes has been compared to Matisse's sun-drenched Mediterranean views, reflecting his exposure to sophisticated currents in both Western and Japanese painting; prints such as Kuro Neko (1947) show how close he came, in both composition and subject, to contemporary Japanese-style painting.

Maeda was mentioned and quoted in Oliver Statler's 1956 book Modern Japanese Woodblock Prints: An Art Reborn.

"I think that woodprints suit the character of a Japanese. The materials are close to our life: wood, paper, even the baren with its bamboo cover. I think of trying etchings and lithographs but I never get around to them, and though I like Onchi's ideas of utilizing all sorts of odd materials, I just can't get away from wood."

Lawrence Smith's Modern Japanese Prints 1912-1989 describes him as "A typical sosaku hanga group artist in many ways, Maeda nevertheless showed untypically the influence of Nihonga native-style painting. He also produced fine mountain scenes a little in the vein of Umetaro Azechi.

== Further readings ==
- Smith, Lawrence. Modern Japanese Prints 1912-1989, British Museum Press, 1994, p. 29
- Statler, Oliver. Modern Japanese Woodblock Prints: An Art Reborn, 1956
