= Sekino Jun'ichirō =

Japanese artist (1914–1988)

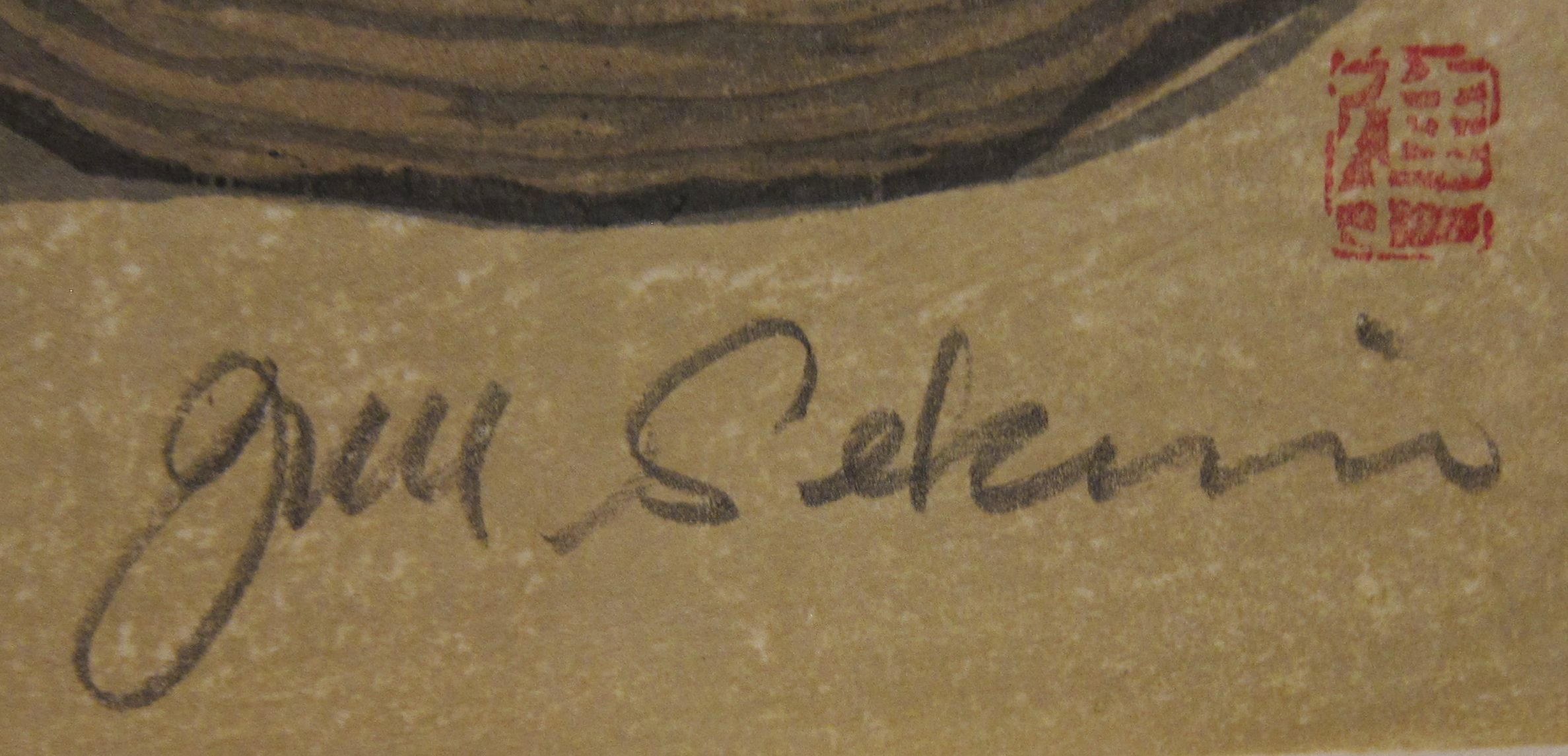
Artist's signature

Sekino Jun'ichirō (Japanese: 関野 凖一郎; born 1914 – 1988) was a Japanese woodblock printer, one of the major postwar artists of the sosaku hanga ("creative print") movement.

== Early life ==
Sekino Jun'ichirō was born in 1914 in the Yasukata district of Aomori, Aomori Prefecture, in northern Japan. From a young age he immersed himself in the study of printmaking. In middle school he started a magazine Ryokuju-mu ("Dream of Green Foliage") devoted to poetry and print. His father was a merchant of agricultural products. From a young age Sekino was inspired by Munakata, who came from his same hometown and to whom he often turned for advice; engraving was his first passion, followed by woodblock printing, and already in this early period he took an interest in bunraku theatre. He had already produced a folio of prints depicting insects before beginning his studies with Kon Junzō in 1931.

Sekino studied at Nishida Takeo's Japanese Etching Institute and enrolled at private school to learn oil painting and drawing. From 1931 he studied intaglio printmaking and lithography under Kon Junzō who considered his pupil "an artistic genius."

His artistic training would, however, prove to be fundamentally self-taught, shaped above all by his own study of old Japanese and European masters such as Sharaku, Hiroshige, Toulouse-Lautrec, Rembrandt, Munch, Dufy, Zorn, Kollwitz and, especially, Albrecht Dürer.

In 1935 Sekino submitted an etching of Aomori harbor to a government sponsored Teiten exhibition and won a first prize. Later the same year he was awarded a prize for print exhibited at the Nihon Hanga Kyokai (Japanese Print Association). He joined the Nihon Hanga Kyokai in 1938, and the Kokugakai (National Picture Association) in 1940. Sekino had already begun exhibiting with the Nihon Hanga Kyōkai from 1932, and also took part in the Chokojuto (1932) and Shin Hanga (1935) exhibitions; in 1936 he produced the print for an illustrated book by Takeo Takei. Sekino constantly dreamed of moving to Tokyo, but family obligations and the family's fertilizer business kept him in Aomori until his mother died and the business failed.

== Career ==
In April 1939 Sekino moved to Tokyo where he was employed by publisher Shimo Taro and met Kōshirō Onchi. He was one of the founding members of Onchi's Ichimokukai (First Thursday Society), where he was considered Onchi's "right-hand man." His period of study with Onchi often surfaces in Sekino's work, where he printed some areas, as Onchi did, with structured colours resulting in mottling and streaking; colour sketches at the margins, sharp edges, and a slight misregistration of forms likewise emerge from the emotional, spontaneous approach clearly inspired by his master. During the Second World War Sekino worked mainly in a munitions factory, but was also involved in organizing lodging and entertainment for kabuki actors and bunraku troupes, an activity that supplied him with subject matter for his later work and brought him into contact with the famous kabuki actor Nakamura Kichiemon, whose woodblock portrait he produced in 1947. This portrait of Kichiemon, strongly influenced by Onchi's 1943 work Hagiwara Sakutarō-zō, is one of Sekino's most celebrated pieces; although his portrait style was shaped by Onchi, it shows a somewhat drier and more controlled method than Onchi's experimental, spontaneous and "wet" approach. Sekino's technique, like Onchi's, relied on soft-edged overprinting without key-block outlines, using various shades of colour to model the face; the complexity of the method required shallow depressions carved into the blocks and graduated shading of pigments applied across multiple overprintings. For this print Sekino needed fifteen separate printing stages and used six blocks of shina plywood, a soft, fine-grained wood, rather than the cherry wood traditionally used in ukiyo-e, achieving greater colour contrast at the cost of some fineness of detail. Alongside further depictions of artists such as Shikō Munakata and Onchi, it became one of his most renowned pieces, and established him as the country's pre-eminent woodblock portraitist.

After the war Sekino took part in every series produced by the Ichimokukai, as well as in three nostalgic 1945–46 woodcuts on the theme of old Tokyo, traditional Japanese dress and Japanese women, besides making reprints for Onchi and contributing both etchings and woodblock prints to illustrated books; by the late 1940s Sekino was earning his living chiefly through book illustration.

Besides portraits, Sekino produced still lifes, landscapes (both rural scenes and cityscapes), depictions of animals, and abstract works. He also worked in lithography and etching, and in 1953 founded the Japanese Etchers Society. The society had its roots in 1951, when Sekino installed an etching press in the kitchen of his own house and began a research group on copper-plate printmaking; there he met the artist Komai, taught copperplate engraving to students, and invited other artists to experiment, among them Hamada, Hamaguchi and Kobayashi Donge. Two years later the group's professional members formally founded the Nihon Dōbanga Kyōkai, with Sekino as its leader and Komai as a leading member. In 1950 he had also founded a society for the study of etching, which formally became the Etchingu Kyōkai in 1953, and that same year held his first solo exhibition in Tokyo at the Yōseidō gallery. After Onchi's death Sekino developed rapidly into a fully independent artist, achieving fame through his prints of kabuki and bunraku theatre, portraits of artistic figures such as Onchi Kōshirō-zō (1952) and Shōzō-ga Munakata Shikō (1968), the Tōkaidō Gojūsan Tsugi series, first exhibited in 1972, and his views of traditional Japanese rooftops; he also produced prints of wheat fields, landscapes, animals and floral compositions, distinguished by his use of an extraordinary number of colours. It was from 1955 that he began exhibiting internationally, and from that point on he worked more in woodblock than in etching.

In 1958, at the invitation of the Japan Society, Sekino taught at America's Pratt Institute. In 1963 Gordon Gilkey of the Oregon State University hired him to teach a class. He also taught at the University of Washington and worked in New Mexico at the Tamarind Studio where he studied with Glen Alps, the inventor of collography. In 1969 he returned to Oregon State where, in 1975, his series depicting the Fifty-three Stations of the Tōkaidō was exhibited with Hiroshige's famous 1834 version.

== Prints ==
Sekino was influenced by German Renaissance artist Albrecht Dürer and stated that, "one of the things I like most about him is his thoroughness, his corner-to-corner completeness."

Sekino created over 400 prints. His years of studying printmaking techniques enabled him to produce work of a consistent and extremely high quality, in excess of most of his contemporary sosaku hanga artists. Onchi honoured him in allowing Sekino to reprint his Portrait of Hagiwara Sakutaro, and he assisted Maekawa Senpan in his Hot Spring Notes series.

As well as the Fifty-Three Stations, Sekino created series such as: Old Capital, Prints of the Narrow Road to the Deep North, Collection of Aomori Folk Toys and Collection of Famous Japan Folk Toys. He contributed to Onchi's 1945 series Scenes of Last Tokyo (Tokyo kaiko zue). In 1959 Sekino began publishing the Tōkaidō Gojūsan Tsugi series, seeking to revitalize Hiroshige's famous scenes from a contemporary perspective; the series can be considered his principal work. Sekino personally made the designs and the carving for the series himself, but entrusted the printing to three skilled craftsmen: Kobayashi Sōkichi, Yoneda Minoru and Iwase Kōichi. After his work was exhibited at the Tokyo International Print Biennale and received awards at the 1957 Cairo Afro-Asian Exhibition, in 1958, with an official invitation from the Rockefeller Foundation and the American-Japan Society, Sekino travelled to the United States for the first time, touring the country and teaching at the Pratt Graphic Center.
