= Maki Haku =

Poem 71-91 by Maki Haku, 1971, woodblock print, ink and color on paper with embossing

Maki Haku (巻白; 1924–2000) is the artistic name of Maejima Tadaaki, who was born in Ibaraki Prefecture. He was a sōsaku-hanga artist in 20th Century Japan.

== Early life ==
As a child Maejima began painting in oils and made his first prints as New Year's greeting cards, a popular custom of the time. Toward the end of World War II, he was trained as a kamikaze pilot in the Japanese air force, but the war ended before he was assigned a mission. In 1945 he graduated from Ibaraki University and became vice-principal of an elementary school. Haku had no formal art training, but his artistic formation instead came from two years of study with the sōsaku-hanga artist Onchi Kōshirō (1891–1955), whose meetings of the Gendai Hanga Kenkyūkai, founded in 1950 under the auspices of the Nihon Hanga Kyōkai, he attended. It is not clear how much direct contact Maki actually had with Onchi. His earliest print dates from the late 1950s, when he adopted the art-name Haku Maki, literally "white scroll," with connotations similar to "empty-headed", to present himself as an eccentric, self-taught artist. He took Onchi's abstraction as a starting point to freely experiment with a mixture of katakana, kanji and calligraphic forms, and began producing ichimai-e (single-sheet prints), initially woodcuts, from the mid-to-late 1950s until near the end of his life, without ever forming close friendships within the Japanese modern art community.

== Personal life and career milestones ==
In 1954 Maki married Umeno Takako, with whom he would spend the rest of his life; Takako supported her husband throughout his career, together with her sister, who assisted him in the printing process until Maki began hiring local assistants in the 1980s. He became a member of the Modern Art Society in 1958 and of the Nihon Hanga Kyōkai, of which he later served as president.

== Style and technique ==
Two unique qualities of Maki Haku prints are the textures achieved by working the designs in wet cement and the use of Kanji (Chinese characters) as design motifs. In 1962, he started adding texture to his prints. At first, he added texture to the entire sheet after it was printed. In 1965, he began embossing designs into unprinted paper by using a press to transfer a design created in cement on a carved plywood board, and then adding color with stencils. He distorted and rearranged the strokes of Chinese characters to produce striking and serene images. For example, Poem 71-91 is a highly stylized representation of the kanji 無, which is pronounced mu and means nothingness, an important concept in some forms of Buddhism.

Maki developed his relief-carving process in the early 1960s: he would first carve a conventional wood block, then place a cement mixture around the raised areas he intended to build up, carving and chiselling it into the desired shape once it had set, before graining the entire surface of the finished block once the cement had fully dried. He rolled on his colours, which could include poster paints, oil colours and offset printing inks, over the raised areas of the block, using stencils to define the areas to be inked, and often applied a thin film of red or cobalt-blue oil paint, lightly diluted with turpentine, over his colours to give the finished print a deep, velvety appearance. The paper was placed on the inked block and first rolled by hand with a soft roller to adhere to the printing block, then passed through an etching press, where heavy pressure embossed the paper and printed the image. He would then take a second sheet of paper coated with diluted rice paste and glue it by hand onto the printed sheet with a hand roller, after which the two glued sheets were passed twice more through the etching press, laminating them and producing an even deeper embossing. He occasionally applied colour by hand to specific areas of a print, and, as a final step, added his artist's seal, which he considered part of the composition. From the mid-to-late 1960s he began printing on laminated torinoko and shin-torinoko paper, a thicker double sheet that made possible his signature cement-relief methodology, and introduced a cataloguing system that let collectors identify a print's year of production and its place within the numbered sequence of unique designs published that year.

In Ushi, Maki sought to give a modern appearance to the cultural heritage of ideograms while preserving an Eastern sensibility, capturing the characteristically Japanese sense of the beauty of space, a feeling of reverence toward boundless space, while also exploiting the boundary offered by the beauty and life of the paper itself. Although Maki cannot strictly be called a calligrapher, he was rather a student of ancient ideograms and Chinese characters, from which he drew ideas for his prints while altering the characters to serve the overall design, the print demonstrates how he adapted older techniques to his own purposes, notably by expressing force through three distinct qualities of black: a traditional solid black in the vertical stroke, a medium-strength black in the lower horizontal stroke, and a finely mottled, semi-grey black in the upper curved stroke, their contrast constantly drawing the eye from one variation to another; this effect was reinforced by his use of three different wood-grain textures across the same three strokes. Maki took the kanji in their present-day form and used his imagination to recreate what he thought might have been their original pictogram; this is especially evident in his interpretations of the character for "woman" (女, Poem 5) and "wife" (妻, Poem 21), both infused with feminine grace and flexibility.

From the late 1960s to the mid-1970s, Maki's prints focused exclusively on developing kanji-based imagery, building up a well-established visual library from which his earlier prints of this phase naturally served as inspiration for later works, producing some of his most compelling, successful and sought-after prints of the period. His working method changed in the 1970s because of severe pain in his arms, hands and shoulders that prevented him from carrying out his work fully, leading him to favour printing from carved wood blocks, a technique he had already used earlier in his career, over the more physically demanding process required by his cement-modelled or wood-carved relief blocks. Beginning in the 1970s and continuing into the 1980s, Maki also incorporated persimmons into his work, producing a series of pieces centred on the fruit that remain a distinctive and sought-after part of his catalogue.

Into the late 1980s and 1990s Maki continued a ceramics theme, producing further series such as Hantō and Wan, made instead as collages; as his health declined, his work adopted this method, reducing his use of embossing and returning to wood blocks and screen-printing media in an effort to ease the physical cost of production while meeting growing demand for his work. Accordingly, in the last decade of his life he began increasing his edition sizes and repeating successful themes such as kanji designs, in an effort to allow as many people as possible the opportunity to acquire one of his iconic prints. Well aware of his declining health, Maki also began to allude metaphorically to his approaching end, both in the subject matter of his designs and through a series titled Z. Toward the end of his career he also produced prints of multicoloured goban (go boards), abstract works marked by geometric motifs, and a small number of prints depicting Mount Fuji; his last known prints were simple woodblocks of traditional sailboats.

== Notable works ==
Haku participated in the Tokyo International Print Biennale in 1957 and 1960. In 1962, his woodcut Ushi was one of ten prints chosen for James Michener's landmark book and print portfolio The Modern Japanese Print: An Appreciation. The book Festive Wine: Ancient Japanese Poems from the Kinkafu is a translation of 21 ancient poems called Kinkafu or Music for Wagon Songs; the title refers to a primitive Japanese harp, a precursor of the modern koto, which Maki rendered in stylised form on the frontispiece. The Kinkafu poems were recorded in both verse and song form, and the scroll itself was discovered in June 1924 in the library of Kyoto University by the scholar Sasaki Nobutsuna, although five of the same poems were already known from the Kojiki (712 AD). The translation is accompanied by Maki Haku's prints, made in 1968–69; the book received the Mainichi Shuppan Bunka Shō prize. Maki's prints offered a lively complement to the content and spirit of the poems, which helped make his work popular internationally; already in these prints, his forms derived from calligraphy while taking on meanings tied to a specific poem, so that the design itself became paramount. Refining Maki's work from its more abstract roots, Festive Wine helped consolidate his use of kanji as the central theme of his design.

== Later career and death ==
In 1998 Maki underwent surgery for stomach cancer, which would lead to his death in 2000; he continued to work, with his wife's assistance, almost to the end of his life. Despite relatively limited contact with his contemporaries, his work became internationally acclaimed, sustained in part by close friendships with American dealers and collectors; his family supported him at home, with the help of his wife Takako, his niece Rie Ohtomo, who assisted his print production into the 1980s, and his student Toru Matsui.

== Collections ==
The Art Institute of Chicago, the Cincinnati Art Museum, the Honolulu Museum of Art, the Los Angeles County Museum of Art, the Museum of Fine Arts, Boston, the Museum of Modern Art (New York), the University of Michigan Museum of Art, and the Philadelphia Museum of Art are among the public collections holding prints by Maki Haku.
