= Sōsaku-hanga =

Japanese art movement

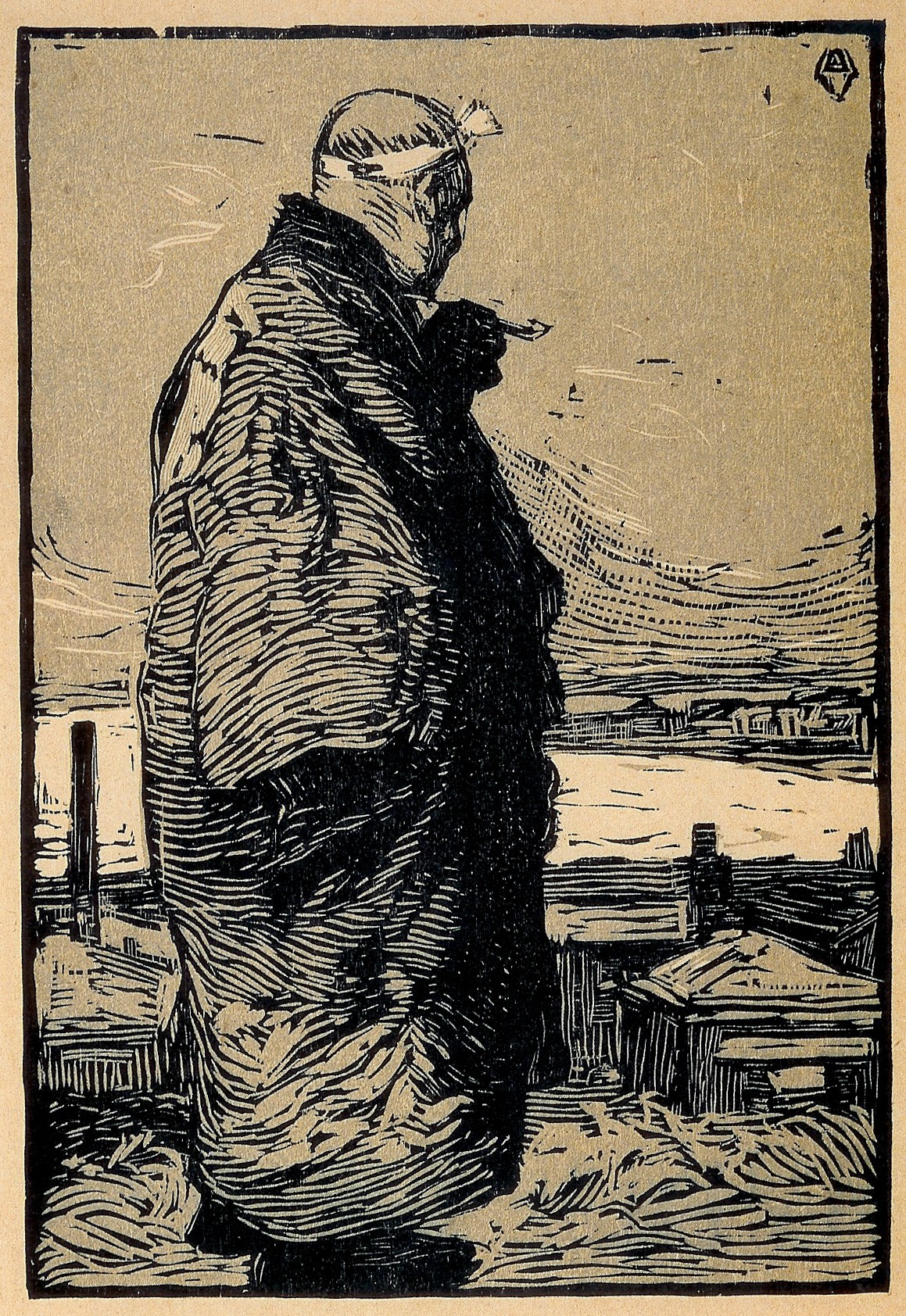
Kanae Yamamoto's "Fisherman" (1904)

Sōsaku-hanga (創作版画, "creative prints") was an art movement of woodblock printing which was conceived in early 20th-century Japan. It stressed the artist as the sole creator motivated by a desire for self-expression, and advocated principles of art that is "self-drawn" (自画 jiga), "self-carved" (自刻 jikoku) and "self-printed" (自摺 jizuri), as opposed to the parallel shin-hanga ("new prints") movement that maintained the traditional ukiyo-e collaborative system where the artist, carver, printer, and publisher engaged in division of labor.

The birth of the sōsaku-hanga movement was signaled by Kanae Yamamoto's (1882–1946) small print Fisherman in 1904. Departing from the ukiyo-e collaborative system, Yamamoto made the print solely on his own: drawing, carving, and printing the image. Such principles of "self-drawn", "self-carved" and "self-printed" became the foundation of the movement, which struggled for existence in prewar Japan, and gained its momentum and flourished in postwar Japan as the genuine heir to the ukiyo-e tradition.

In practice, however, the distinction of sosaku-hanga to other movements was somewhat more pragmatic. For example, one of the leading artists, Kōshirō Onchi, commissioned carvers, such as Yamagishi Kazue, and printers, such as his student Sekino Jun'ichirō, to produce his work. The fundamental difference of sōsaku-hanga was that the artist had total artistic control - the artist was the publisher, chose the subject and chose whether to carve or print themselves or to employ specialist carvers or printers.

The 1951 São Paulo Art Biennial witnessed the success of the creative print movement. Both of the Japanese winners, Yamamoto and Kiyoshi Saitō (1907–1997) were printmakers, who outperformed Japanese paintings (nihonga), Western-style paintings (yōga), sculptures and avant-garde. Other sōsaku-hanga artists such as Kōshirō Onchi (1891–1955), Un'ichi Hiratsuka (1895–1997), Sadao Watanabe (1913–1996) and Maki Haku (1924–2000) are also well known in the West.

== Origins and principles ==
The creative print movement was one of the many manifestations of the rise of the individual after decades of modernization. In both artistic and literary circles, there emerged at the turn of the century expressions of the "self". In 1910, Kōtarō Takamura's (1883–1956) "A Green Sun" encouraged artists' individual expression: "I desire absolute freedom of art. Consequently I recognize the limitless authority of individuality of the artist ... Even if two or three artists should paint a "green sun", I would never criticize them for I myself may see a green sun". In 1912, in "Bunten and the Creative Arts" (Bunten to Geijutsu), Natsume Sōseki (1867–1916) states that "art begins with the expression of the self and ends with the expression of the self". These two essays marked the beginning of the intellectual discussion of the "self", which immediately found echo in the art scene. 1910 witnessed the first publication of a monthly magazine called White Birch (Shirakaba), the most important magazine shaping the thought of the Taishō period. Aspiring young artists organized its first exhibition in the same year. Shirakaba also sponsored exhibitions of Western art.

Stylistically, sōsaku-hanga also abandoned the outlined contour typical of ukiyo-e, much as shin-hanga did; its subject matter, however, diverged sharply from the traditional Japanese repertoire, becoming markedly varied and eclectic, since it was meant to be a pronounced expression of the artist's individuality: where shin-hanga looked to Impressionism, sōsaku-hanga was influenced by the German Expressionists and by abstract art, currents that had reached sōsaku-hanga artists through their attendance at art academies in Paris, Rome and Berlin, part of a late-nineteenth-century government policy of Westernization that sent students abroad to study engineering, law, military science and Western art; other channels of information and influence on European art movements were art magazines such as the German Jugend and the Japanese Hōsun. Sōsaku-hanga artists were also frequently not well versed in the complex techniques of engraving and printing, which gives certain of their prints an elementary, naive, almost rough quality; the personal, experimental nature of the movement makes its output difficult to group into easily identifiable categories, yet it was precisely this eclecticism that kept the movement vital before the Second World War, and, briefly, after it as well.

The birth of sōsaku-hanga is traditionally traced to Yamamoto's print Gyofu ("Fisherman"), presented in the magazine Myōjō in 1904, which marked the movement's departure from the traditional collaborative ukiyo-e system; it was thanks to this print that sōsaku-hanga came to be recognized as the heir to the ukiyo-e tradition.

== Early development and institutions ==
In 1914, Onchi, Fujimori and Tanaka, three students at the Tokyo Academy, founded the magazine Tsukuhae, and in 1915 an important exhibition on German Expressionism was held.

In its formative years, the sōsaku-hanga movement, like many others such as the shin-hanga, futurism and proletarian art movements, struggled to survive, experiment and find a voice in an art scene dominated by those mainstream arts that were well received by the Bunten (Japan Art Academy). Hanga in general (including shin-hanga) did not achieve the status of Western oil paintings (yōga) in Japan. Hanga was considered a craft that was inferior to paintings and sculptures. Ukiyo-e woodblock prints had always been considered as mere reproductions for mass commercial consumption, as opposed to the European view of ukiyo-e as art, during the climax of Japonisme. It was impossible for sōsaku-hanga artists to make a living by just doing creative prints. Many of the later renowned sōsaku-hanga artists, such as Kōshirō Onchi (also known as the father of the creative print movement), were book illustrators and wood carvers. It was not until 1927 that hanga was accepted by the Teiten (the former Bunten). In 1935, extracurricular classes on hanga were finally permitted.

As early as 1918, the Nihon Sōsaku Hanga Kyōkai had been formed; it would soon grow into the movement's leading association for creative printmakers before dissolving in 1931 and being reborn as the Nihon Hanga Kyōkai. In June 1918 Yamamoto had co-founded the association with the lithographer Kazuma Oda, the horishi Takeo Terasaki, and the hanga artist Kogan Tobari, already a member of the Pan no Kai; the Nihon Sōsaku Hanga Kyōkai held its first exhibition at the Mitsukoshi department store gallery in Nihonbashi on 15–20 January 1919, showing 277 works by twenty-six artists, including two English artists resident in Japan, Bernard Leach and W. Westley Manning, and Yamamoto himself, who exhibited seventeen woodcuts and two etchings. The exhibition drew twenty thousand visitors and was widely covered by the press, including a special issue of the magazine Mizue containing an article in which Yamamoto set out the principles of the art form and the goals of the Nihon Sōsaku Hanga Kyōkai; its success was such that the exhibition was repeated at Mitsukoshi in Osaka. Following the 1919 exhibition, Yamamoto passed leadership of the Nihon Sōsaku Hanga Kyōkai to Onchi.

== 1920s magazines and exhibitions ==
In the 1920s sōsaku-hanga exhibitions were rare, and magazines played a fundamental role in giving artists visibility. The most important of these was Hanga, founded in 1924 by Hisayoshi Yamaguchi, owner of the print house Hanga no Ie in Kobe, which had already published Un'ichi Hiratsuka's series Tokyo Shinsai Ato Fukei. Two other print series were also very important: the publisher Jūtarō Nakajima published Nihon Fūkei Hanga and Shin Tokyo Hyakkei, two collections featuring the leading sōsaku-hanga artists of the prewar period, namely Maekawa, Fujimori, Onchi, Henmi, Hiratsuka, Kawakami, Sakuichi and Kanenori.

== Wartime ==
The wartime years from 1939 to 1945 was a time of metamorphosis for the creative print movement. The First Thursday Society, which was crucial to the postwar revival of Japanese prints, was formed in 1939 through the groups of people who gathered once a month in the house of Kōshirō Onchi in Tokyo to discuss subjects of woodblock prints. First initial members included Gen Yamaguchi (1896–1976) and Sekino Jun'ichirō (1914–1988). American connoisseurs Ernst Hacker, William Hartnett and Oliver Statler also attended and helped revive Western interest in Japanese prints. The First Thursday Collection (Ichimoku-shū), a collection of prints by members to circulate among each other, was produced in 1944. The group provided comradeship and a venue for artistic exchange and nourishment during the difficult war years when resources were scarce and censorship severe.

== Postwar creative print movement ==
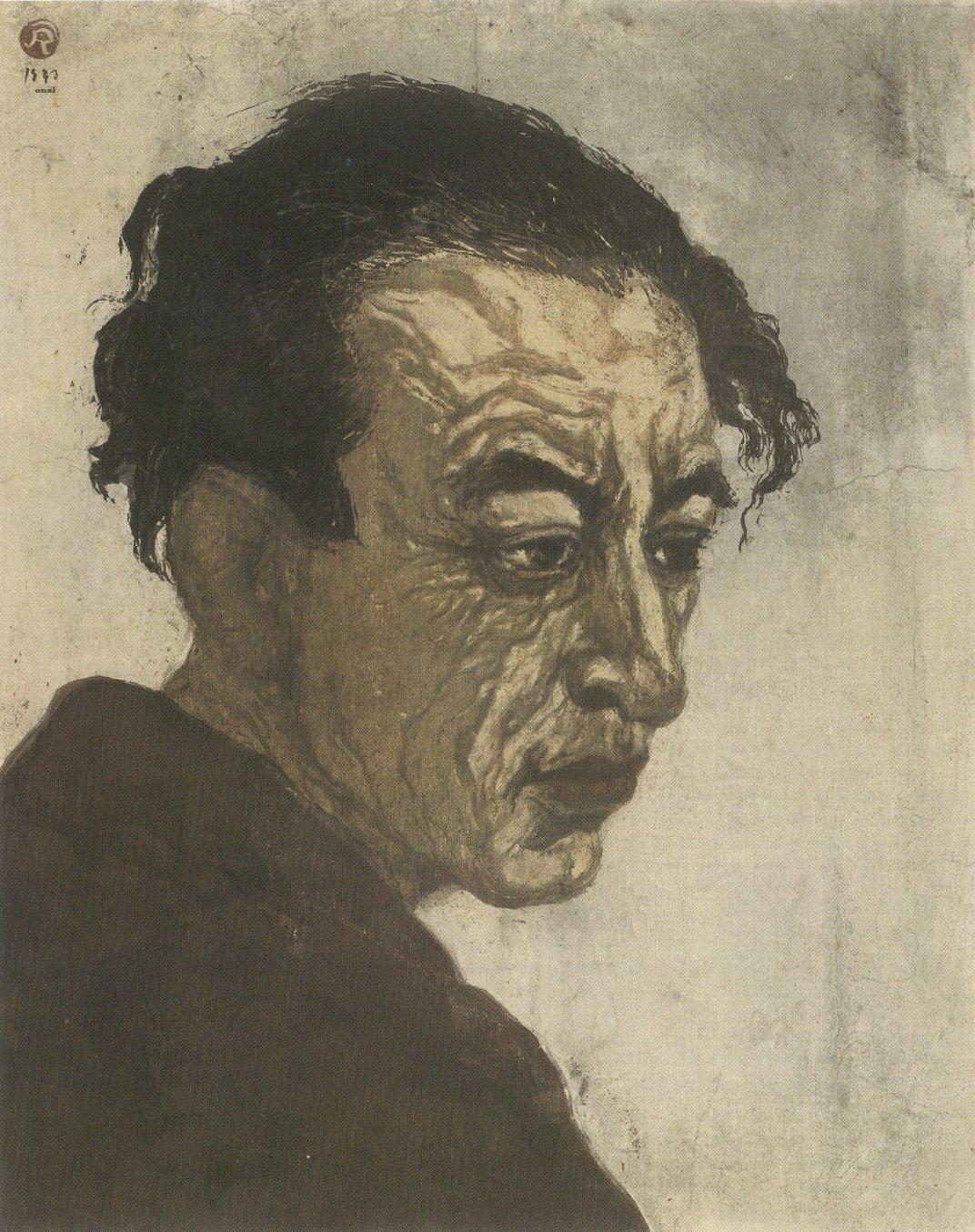
Portrait of the poet Hagiwara Sakutarō, by Kōshirō Onchi, 1943

The rebirth of the Japanese print coincided with the rebirth of Japan after World War II. During the islands' occupation, American soldiers and their wives bought and collected Japanese prints as souvenirs. It can be said that Japanese prints became one of the components of postwar economic reconstruction. With the aim of promoting "democratic art", American patronage shifted from the more traditional shin-hanga to the modern-leaning sōsaku-hanga. Abstract art had been banned by the military government during wartime, but postwar, artists such as Kōshirō Onchi turned completely to abstract art. By 1950 abstraction was the primary mode of the creative print movement, and Japanese prints were perceived as a genuine blending of East and West. The 1951 São Paulo Art Biennial was Japan’s first postwar submission to an international exhibition. Notable artists such as Shikō Munakata (1903–1975) and Naoko Matsubara (b. 1937) worked in the folk art tradition (mingei), and held solo shows in the United States.

== Contemporary Japanese prints ==
Contemporary Japanese prints have a rich diversity in subject matter and style. Tetsuya Noda (b. 1940) employs photography and produces everyday qualities in his prints in the form of photographic diaries. Artists such as Maki Haku (1924–2000) and Shinoda Toko (1913–2021) synthesize calligraphy and abstract expression and produce strikingly beautiful and serene images. Sadao Watanabe worked in the mingei (folk art) tradition, synthesizing Buddhist figure portrayal and Western Christianity in his unique Biblical prints.

From the 1960s onwards, the line between fine art and commercial media became blurred. Pop and conceptual artists work with professional technicians, and possibilities for innovation are endless.

== Notable sōsaku hanga artists ==
- Atō Sengai
- Okiie Hashimoto
- Azechi Umetarō
- Eiichi Kotozuka
- Un'ichi Hiratsuka
- Itow Takumi
- Kitaoka Fumio
- Koizumi Kishio
- Yasuhide Kobashi
- Sakuichi Fukazawa
- Masao Maeda
- Toshirō Maeda
- Senpan Maekawa
- Maki Haku
- Matsubara Naoko
- Yoshitoshi Mori
- Shikō Munakata
- Hajime Namiki
- Tetsuya Noda
- Gihachiro Okuyama
- Kōshirō Onchi
- Saitō Kiyoshi
- Kihei Sasajima
- Sekino Jun'ichirō
- Takumi Shinagawa
- Toko Shinoda
- Hiroyuki Tajima
- Tomikichirō Tokuriki
- Sadao Watanabe
- Gen Yamaguchi
- Kanae Yamamoto
- Hodaka Yoshida
- Tōshi Yoshida
- Ansei Uchima
- Suwa Kanenori
- Fujimori Shizuo
- Kiichi Okamoto
- Tadashige Ono
- Shiro Kasamatsu

== See also ==
- One Hundred Views of New Tokyo
