= Matsubara Naoko =

Japanese artist (born 1937)

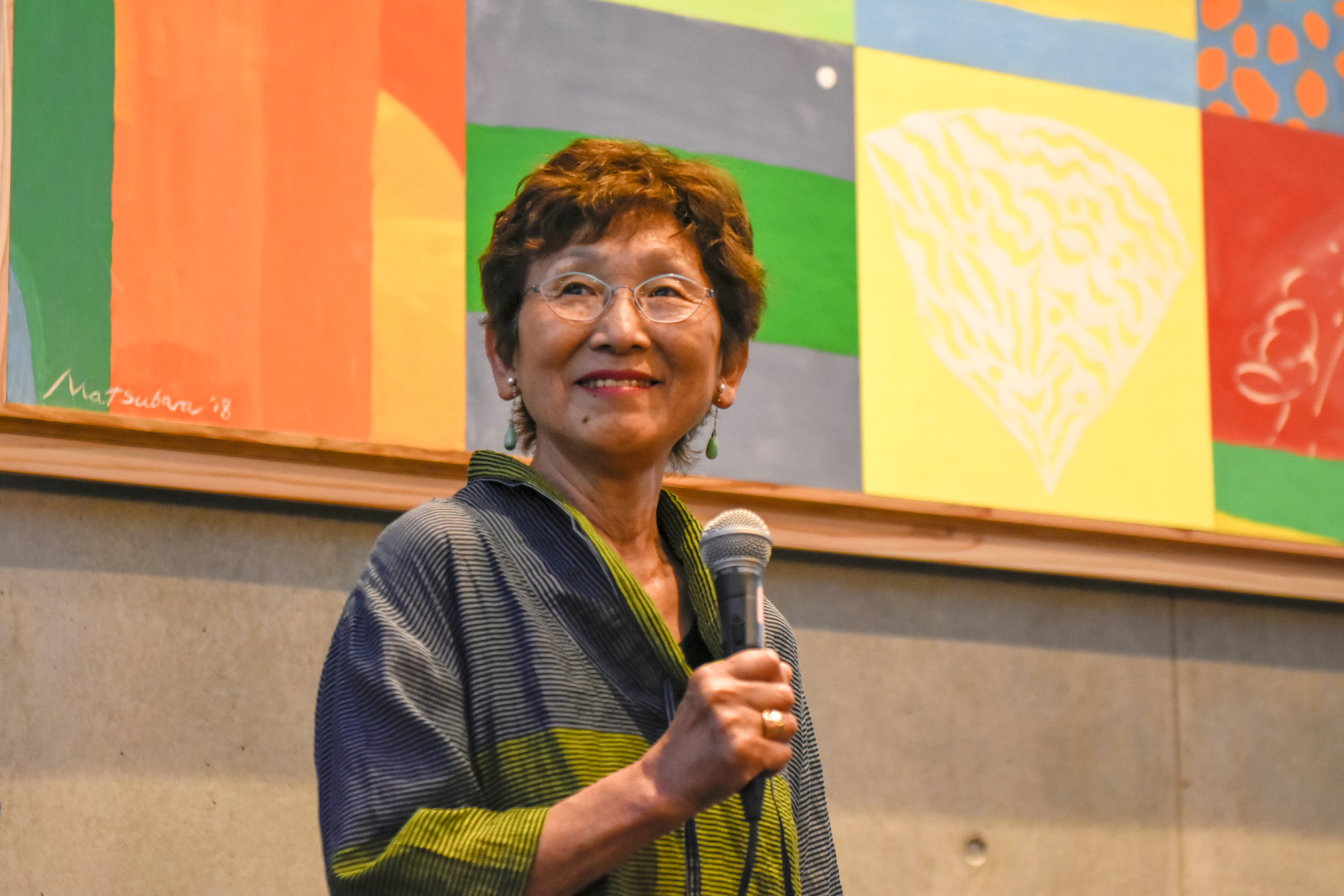
- Naoko Matsubara presents her mural "Chromatic Convergence" (2018)
- Born: 1937
- Education: Kyoto University of Applied Arts in 1960; MFA in the School of Fine Arts at the Carnegie Mellon University in Pittsburgh
- Known for: graphic artist

Matsubara Naoko RCA (松原 直子; born 1937 in Tokushima) is a Japanese-Canadian print-maker.

== Early life ==
Matsubara was born in Tokushima, Shikoku, the daughter of a Shinto priest; her family moved to Kyoto in 1941. She graduated from the Kyoto University of Applied Arts (Kyoto Geijutsu Daigaku) in 1960. She then pursued an MFA in the School of Fine Arts at the Carnegie Mellon University in Pittsburgh on a Fulbright Travel Grant for two years, and studied a further year at the Royal College of Art, London. From 1965 to 1966 she taught at the Pratt Graphic Art Center in New York.

Naoko Matsubara's older sister is the novelist Hisako Matsubara, they collaborated on the English (1966) and German (1968) publications of the Japanese fairy tale Taketori Monogatari. Naoko did the illustrations, while her sister did the translations and the commentary.

== Life and work ==
After travel abroad, the artist returned to Japan for two years, before going back to the United States. There she worked as assistant to Fritz Eichenberg, and also taught at the Pratt Institute of Graphic Art in New York, as well as at the University of Rhode Island. From 1961 she lived permanently in the West, though she frequently revisited her home country, and from 1962 onward held solo exhibitions almost every year in North America, and occasionally in Europe and Japan. Currently she lives and works in Oakville, Canada.

Woodblock print of the Boston Public Library by Matsubara Naoko.

Naoko Matsubara's father was the chief priest of Kenkun Jinja, a Shinto shrine in Kyoto built in 1880 by Emperor Meiji to commemorate the general Oda Nobunaga (1534–1582), the first military leader to attempt to unify Japan at the close of the Sengoku period; the shrine was initially sited on a slope called Funaokayama, for its shape, but was moved to the summit thirty years later. This connection explains the presence of shrines and temples in Matsubara's prints, which became one of the major recurring themes of her work. Shrines and temples became one of the major themes of Matsubara's works. Naoko Matsubara's style is influenced by her teacher Munakata Shiko (1903–1975), who worked in the mingei (folk art) tradition.

== Munakata and artistic development ==
Unlike most Japanese artists who emigrated abroad, Matsubara decisively refused to internationalize her work, and her technique and style have remained close to what she developed as a young woman under the inspiration of Munakata, one of her teachers during her post-academic formative period. Through him she came into early contact not only with his other students but also with associates of the Banga-in, the school he had founded, where in 1963 she won the prestigious Kegon Prize at the annual group exhibition. In 1962, after she sent him some of her woodcuts for his assessment, Munakata wrote her a long letter praising her work, noting, among other things, how unusual it was for a woman in Japan to create work of such weight, mass and intensity; both artists always sought and admired a powerful, expressive art capable of instilling life from within the wood block itself, and Munakata was fascinated by the masterful use of the knife in her print A Big Tree.

== Style and technique ==
Much of Matsubara's work exemplifies an energetic style of block-carving that recalls Munakata's own. Although she has drawn colour images, her monochrome or limited-colour prints are particularly indicative of her understanding of the power of the wood block. Matsubara applied the word "Strength" to the titles of some of her early woodcuts, such as her large-scale images of solitary trees, among the most expressive and monumental woodcuts ever made on the subject, in which an elemental life force seems so present as to instil in the viewer a sense of nature's timelessness; in the 1966 print Inner Strength, a massive, gnarled tree is printed at an immense scale for a woodcut. Especially in her early prints, one senses Matsubara's need for great strength, even physical strength, expressed through her aggressive manner of carving, as a way of arriving at clarity of mind and producing new work that brought freshness to her art.

Beyond woodcuts, which she has produced for more than fifty years, Matsubara has also worked in woodcut paper collage, acrylic painting, watercolour, handmade paper sculpture, and large-scale public murals. Her position in the history of Japanese woodcuts was only fully recognised in 1976, with the exhibition Mokuhan: Woodcuts by Munakata and Matsubara at the Art Gallery of Greater Victoria. Her works range from small portfolio pieces to very large woodcuts, almost all in black and white or with one or more muted colours, but consistently display a characteristic energy of design and cutting. The 1977 print Kenkun Jinja reveals vigorously carved lines and block forms creating multiple perspectives, the viewpoint shifting to accommodate receding depth, drawing the viewer to focus on details to appreciate the lively energy invested in the design, while also taking in the whole as a balance among its many pictorial elements. In 1986 Matsubara travelled to Tibet, an experience that led her to new approaches for rendering colour and space in her woodcuts, evident in the revolutionary design of Tibetan Sky E, the first of twenty-seven prints comprising the Tibetan Sky series, which required ten years of preparation and resonates with her broader interest in new ways of exploring colour and space.

== Notable series ==
Her first major series was Half Tame (1964), the first of many series and portfolios on Western and Asian literary themes, illustrating poems by Roger Shattuck, a professor of French literature whose essay on Proust won the National Book Award. In 1969 she made the illustrations for the German edition of the Japanese tale Taketori Monogatari, with translation and commentary by her sister, the novelist Hisako Matsubara. Among her early portfolios was an eleven-print set titled Solitude, published by Aquarius Press in 1971 and designed to accompany an essay drawn from Henry David Thoreau's Walden; every print in the portfolio was printed on hōsho paper made by Ichibei Iwano VIII (1901–1976). The design of Solitude shows a vigorous carving style, but the sharp angularity familiar from Munakata's influential works and from some of Matsubara's own early prints is softened here by the curvilinear motif of a willow, rendered in black, and its reflection in dark green, a treatment that can be read as an expansion of Munakata's style and of expressionist woodcut practice, filtered through her own vision and suited to a subject whose intent was clearly to express the stillness and reflection already central to Thoreau's essay.

== Collections ==
Her works are part of the collections of many museums around the world, such as the Portland Art Museum, the Harvard Art Museums, the Fine Arts Museums of San Francisco, the Carnegie Museum of Art, the Detroit Institute of Art, the University of Michigan Museum of Art, the Sidney and Lois Eskenazi Museum of Art, the Pennsylvania Academy of Fine Arts, the Los Angeles County Museum of Art, the Albright-Knox Art Gallery, the Yale University Art Gallery, the Philadelphia Museum of Art, the Art Institute of Chicago, the Royal Ontario Museum, the Albertina in Vienna, the British Museum in London, the Kyoto National Museum of Modern Art, the Museum of Fine Arts, Boston, the Tokyo National Museum of Modern Art, the Smithsonian Institution and the Library of Congress in Washington, the Hamburg Museum of Arts and Crafts, the Haifa Museum in Israel and the Art Gallery of New South Wales in Sydney.

She is a member of the Royal Canadian Academy of Arts. In 2024, she had her first Art Gallery of Ontario solo exhibition with 20 woodcut prints, anchored by Tagasode (2014), a monumental 2 meter long single-sheet print which is the culmination of Matsubara's printmaking career.

== Publications ==
- Matsubara, Naoko. Boston Impressions. Woodcuts by Naoko Matsubara. Text by Sinclair Hitchings. Barre Publications, 1970.
- Matsubara, Naoko. Kyoto Woodcuts. Tokyo, New York: Kodansha International; New York: Distributed in the United States by Kodansha International/USA, through Harper & Row, 1978.
- Matsubara, Naoko. In Praise of Trees. NY, London: Mosaic Press, 1985.
- Matsubara, Naoko. Tibetan Sky. Ontario: Bayeux Arts Inc., 1997.
- Matsubara, Naoko. Tales of Days Gone By. Tuttle Publishing, 2004.

== See also ==
- Sōsaku hanga

== Additional sources ==
- "Images and biography" at Abbozzo Gallery web site (archived)
- Chika Okeke-Agulu, Postcolonial Modernism: Art and Decolonization in Twentieth-Century Nigeria (Duke University Press, 2015), p. 181.
- Helen Merritt, Nanako Yamada: Guide to Modern Japanese Woodblock Prints. 1900–1975. University of Hawaii Press, Honolulu HI 1995, ISBN 0-8248-1732-X, p. 86
- Norman Tollman, Mary Tollman: Collecting Modern Japanese Prints: Then & Now. Tuttle Publishing, 2013, ISBN 9781462903740, pp. 222-224
