= Fujimori Shizuo =

Japanese woodblock print artist

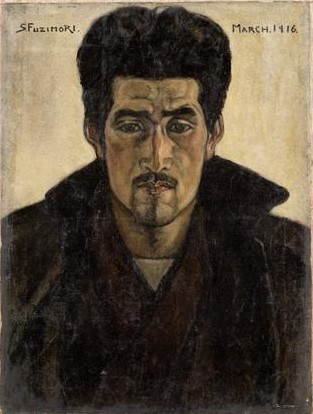
Self portrait, 1916

Fujimori Shizuo (藤森 静雄; August 1, 1891 – May 28, 1943) was a Japanese woodblock artist associated with the sōsaku-hanga (creative prints) movement. His style was strongly influenced by Expressionism.

Fujimori was born in 1891 in Kurume, Fukuoka prefecture. He studied Western-style art (yōga) with the Hakuba-kai ("White Horse Society") in 1910, and the next year enrolled in the Tokyo School of Fine Arts from where he graduated in 1916. At the school he met Onchi Kōshirō with whom he collaborated on Tsukuhae ("Moonglow"), a print and poetry magazine, producing 37 prints. He studied yōga with the Hakuba-kai ("White Horse Society") in 1910, where he met Kyokichi Tanaka, and the next year enrolled in the Tokyo School of Fine Arts from where he graduated in 1916. Fujimori also studied with the yōga painters Kuroda and Fujishima, but drew his inspiration from Aoki. In March 1916, during his formative years, he made a self-portrait in the yōga manner that shows a competent mastery of the academic style taught at the school, a figurative realism markedly different from the radical expressionist designs he was exploring alongside Onchi and Tanaka for Tsukuhae. At the school he met Kōshirō Onchi with whom he collaborated on Tsukuhae, a print and poetry magazine, producing 37 prints.

In 1919 he contributed to the first exhibition of the Japan Creative Print Association (Nihon Sosaku-Hanga Kyokai). After a period teaching in Fukuoka and Taiwan, in 1922 he moved to Tokyo to pursue a career as a professional artist in the fields of painting, printmaking and illustration. He worked as editor of Shi to hanga, was a contributor to many other publications, and was a founding member of the Nihon Hanga Kyōkai in 1931. Working once more with Onchi, and with Ōtsuki Kenji, he also founded the art magazine Naizai in 1921. After a period teaching in Fukuoka and Taiwan, in 1922 he moved to Tokyo to pursue a career as a professional artist in the fields of painting, printmaking and illustration. Throughout his career Fujimori contributed to several dōjin zasshi (coterie magazines), including Shi to Hanga (1922–25), Kaze (1927–28), Bijutsu-han (1932–34), Han Geijutsu (1932–36) and Kasuri (1934–36), and was a founding member of the Nihon Hanga Kyōkai in 1931.

He provided thirteen prints for the seminal sōsaku hanga series One Hundred Views of New Tokyo (Shin Tokyo hyakkei) of 1929–32, and produced his own series, Twelve Views of Great Tokyo (Dai Tokyo Junikei), in 1933–34.

He returned to live in Iizuka in 1939, and died on 28 May 1943, the year after the sudden death of his eldest son.

== Style and notable prints ==
Fujimori produced a series of designs featuring figures casting shadows, some suggesting isolation, mystery or foreboding; the shadow in Yūgata no Piano, included in volume II of Tsukuhae in 1914, is the most dramatic of these, its full meaning made deliberately hard to discern through a symbolist design intended to evoke a different emotion in every viewer. A recurring motif in Fujimori's early work is the isolated figure, evoking a diffuse mood of anxiety or sinister vulnerability: in an untitled small woodcut (167 × 147 mm) from the same period as Tsukuhae volume II, a solitary figure is shown slumped upright in a field, the shapes of blades of grass echoing a sky filled with unnatural, sinuous lines, a pale blue tint spread across the whole pictorial space to create a sense of oppression suggesting that the figure carries a tragic burden. Fujimori's first print, Imōto wa Yaminu (October 1914), also published in Tsukuhae volume II, likewise takes up these themes: here illness serves as the explicit subject of the small woodcut (196 × 91 mm), in which a nun is shown lying as though a corpse, her hands resting on her chest and her feet crossed, while her brother sits bent over her in anguish; flowing lines are carved on either side of a central brown band, and a flock of black birds flies over her prone body in a symbolic inverted "S" formation, her body not firmly fixed in space, as though it might float along the brown band, or river, into oblivion.

Fujimori's landscape and figurative styles were strongly influenced by Expressionism, contributing in particular to the sombre atmosphere of Shin Tokyo Hyakkei and to the expressionist tendencies of Tsukuhae. According to Onchi, his bold and simple expressionistic carving style may have derived from the loss of his right thumb in an accident in his youth; it has also been suggested, however, that Expressionism, already central to the work of Onchi and Tanaka, may simply have influenced Fujimori, whose prints absorbed the antiquated style the two more adventurous artists were pursuing, and that Tanaka's terminal tuberculosis in 1915 may have further accentuated its melancholic aspect.

== Gallery ==
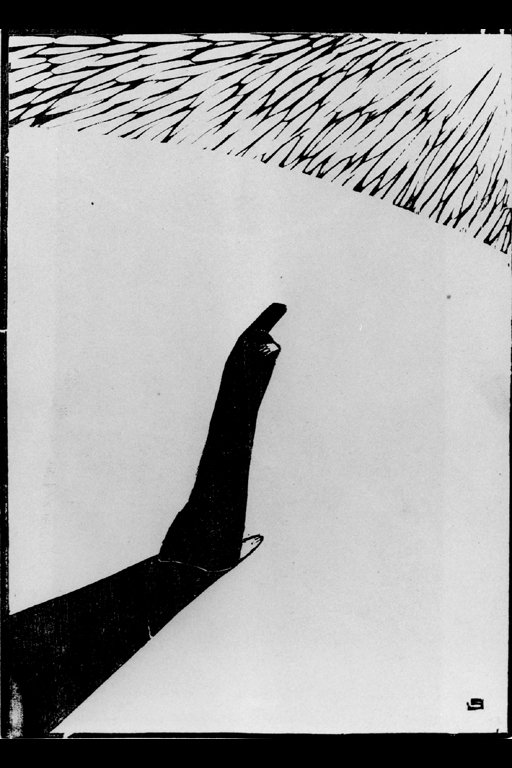
Against the light

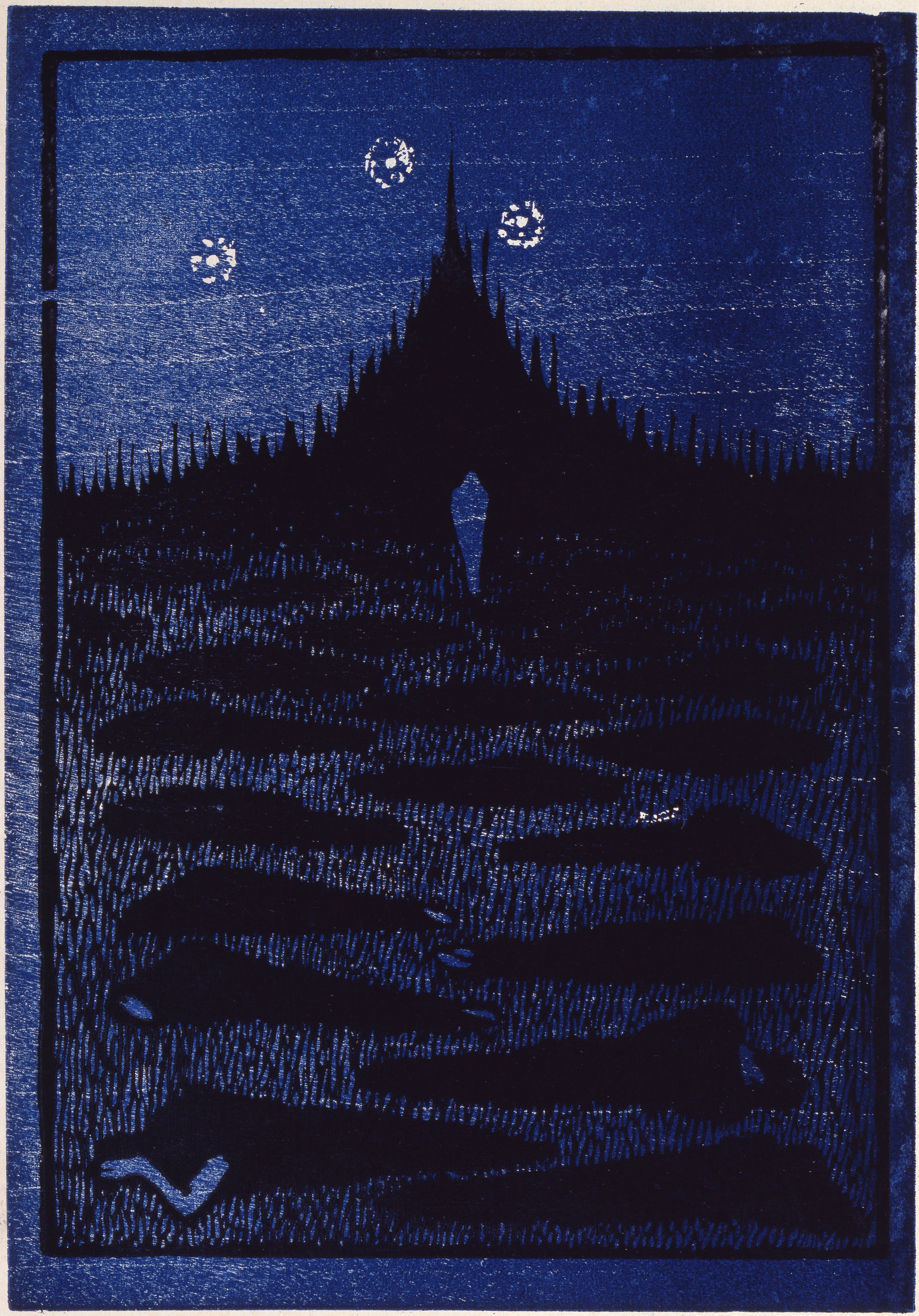
Night, 1914

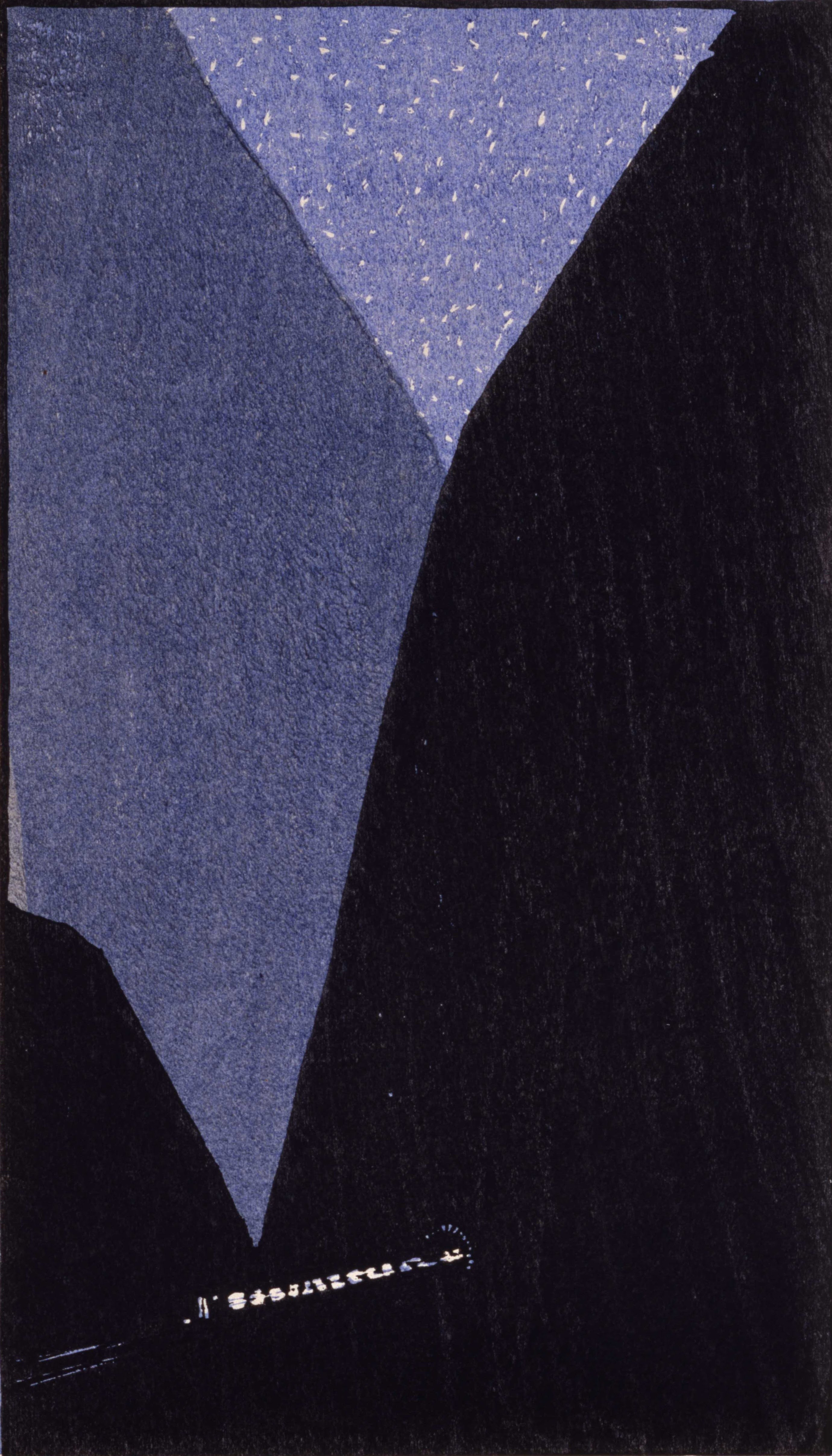
Nature and Life, 1914

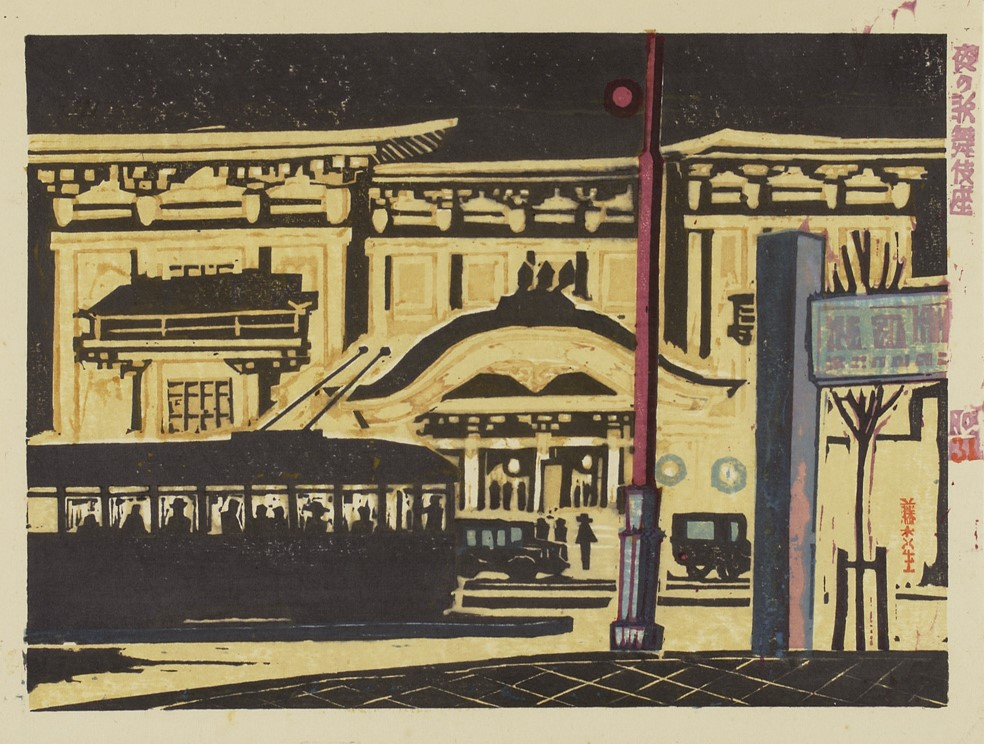
Kabuki-Theater from 100 Views of New Tokyo

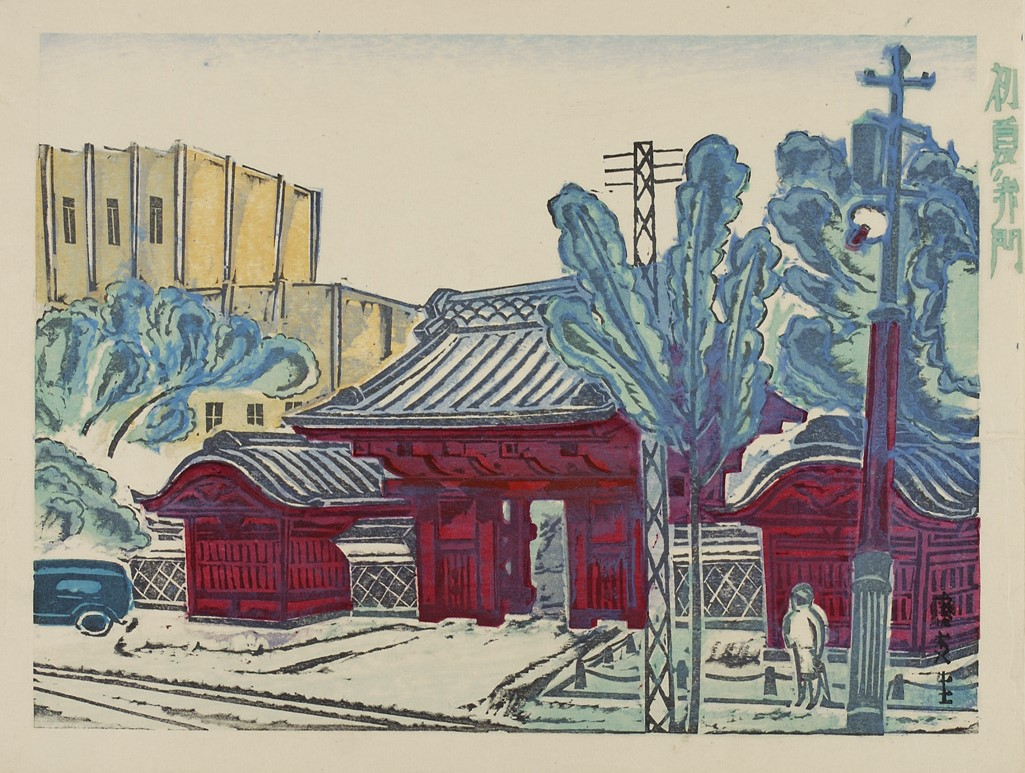
Red Gate from 100 Views of New Tokyo

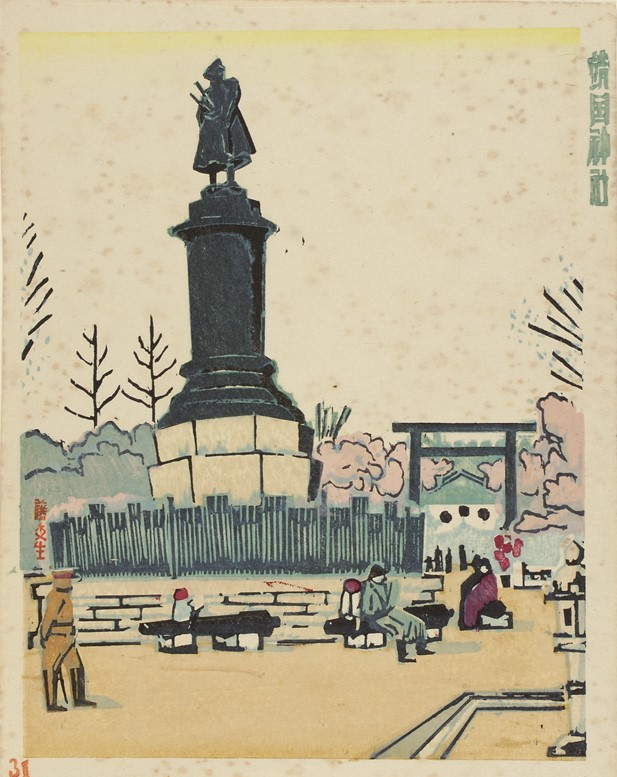
Yasukuni Shrine from 100 Views of New Tokyo

== Further readings ==
- Merritt, Helen; Yamada, Nanako (1995). Guide to Modern Japanese Woodblock Prints: 1900–1975. University of Hawaii Press.
- Reigle Newland, Amy (2005). The Hotei Encyclopedia of Japanese Woodblock Prints. Hotei Publishing Company.
- Jenkins, Donald (1983). Images of a Changing World: Japanese Prints of the Twentieth Century. Portland Art Museum. p. 83.
