= Hiroyuki Tajima =

Japanese printmaker

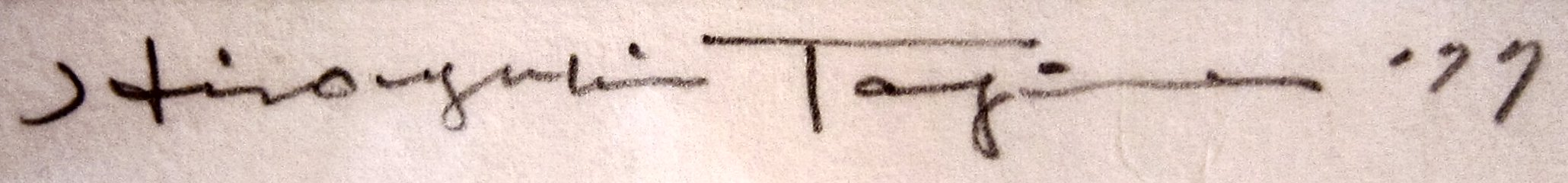
Typical signature of Hiroyuki Tajima

Two Exhiles, woodblock print by Hiroyuki Tajima, 1972, private collection

Hiroyuki Tajima (田嶋 宏行, Tajima Hiroyuki; 1911–1984) was a Japanese printmaker of the sōsaku-hanga school. He was born in Tokyo and graduated from Nihon University in 1932. In 1943, he graduated from the Western-style painting division of the Tokyo School of Fine Arts. He took a broad interest in many facets of art, including textile dyeing under Hirakawa Matsugorō and printmaking under Nagase Yoshi (1891–1978), an artist of the Sōsaku-hanga school. Inspired by Dadaist and Surrealist ideals, in 1946 he joined the Bijutsu Bunka Kyōkai, a group dedicated to exploring and reviving the ideals of abstract and Surrealist painting that had been suppressed during the Second World War; that same year he made his first print, but in the 1950s he temporarily set printmaking aside to devote himself instead to writing poetry and short stories. He returned to woodblock printing in the 1960s, joining the Nihon Hanga Kyōkai in 1963, taking part in international exhibitions and exploring unconventional materials and complex textures in his abstract prints.

== Style and technique ==
In the 1960s and 1970s Tajima developed his characteristic abstract style, densely pigmented with broad areas of rich, dense colour, a style nonetheless grounded in the ideals of East Asian calligraphy, traditional Japanese pictorial structure, and a sense of space drawn partly from his Zen Buddhist beliefs, even as its execution was clearly informed by Western art movements. His bold compositions, tempered by a solemn sense of balance and a distillation of form, result in works imbued with a sublime presence and a meditative spirit, in which memory and recollection occupy a prominent place. His abstract prints typically have complex surfaces, achieved by building up the printing block with various materials, including crumpled paper.

Tajima's technique consisted of intensely brushing dyes onto a dark tonal ground, lending luminosity to the white areas while enriching the print's base colours; textured areas fade into dark planes as though floating on a cold liquid, so that fascinating, sparkling forms are set off by simple, restful ground forms, a rare combination of complexity and assured simplicity that makes his work both exciting and reassuring. To make his distinctive wood blocks, Tajima developed his own ink, mixing powdered colour with a phenol-formaldehyde resin (Bakelite), an extremely water-repellent plastic medium; he used this ink for one printing of the design, then printed again with a water-based ink or dye that coloured only the areas left unprinted by the special ink. In 1969 he began making prints on canvas using broadly the same techniques, but soon abandoned the approach. During this period he also earned a living producing more popular fūkeiga (landscape prints), quite unlike his typical abstract work, under the pseudonym Nagai Kiyoshi. His prints were particularly promoted by the Red Lantern Shop in Kyoto, and most of them can be found illustrated in that gallery's periodic English-language catalogues.

== Further readings ==
- Blakemore, Frances, Who's Who in Modern Japanese Prints, New York, John Weatherhill, 1976, 192.
- Merritt, Helen and Nanako Yamada. (1995). Guide to Modern Japanese Woodblock Prints, 1900–1975. Honolulu: University of Hawaii Press. ISBN 9780824817329; ISBN 9780824812867; OCLC 247995392.
- Smith, Lawrence, Modern Japanese Prints 1912–1989, London, British Museum, 1994.
- Robertson, Ronald G., Contemporary Printmaking in Japan, Tokyo, Zokeisha, and New York, Crown, 1965.
