= Gihachiro Okuyama =

Japanese artist (1907–1981)

Gihachiro Okuyama (奥山 儀八郎, Okuyama Gihachirō; February 17, 1907 – October 1, 1981) was a 20th-century Japanese commercial artist and woodblock printmaker. He was a prolific artist of the shin-hanga and sōsaku-hanga styles. Okuyama is noted for his landscape prints, both in color and black-and-white, as well as his simple prints of scenes that interject elements of the modernization of Japan into an otherwise traditional view.

== Biography ==
Gihachiro Okuyama was born in the city of Sagae, Yamagata, in the Tohoku region, on February 17, 1907. He began as a commercial artist, creating advertising art for many different companies; between 1928 and 1931 he produced around forty poster designs for the watercolour printer (surishi) Hidekichi Uchida, alongside commercial woodblock advertisements. He created successful commercial art for the Japan Wool Company and Nikka Whiskey. In 1931 he founded his own advertising company, the Tokyo Kōkoku Bijutsu Kyōkai, and the following year contributed prints to the series Dai Tokyo Hyakkei ("A Hundred Views of Greater Tokyo"). His son Gijin was born in Tokyo in 1934, at a time when rising pre-war tensions had already damaged the American market for Japanese goods, a situation that worsened during the Pacific War.

Okuyama studied printmaking with Gajin Kosaka beginning in 1923, as well as with noted artist Kendo Ishii, and began exhibiting prints with the Nihon Sosaku Hanga Association in 1927. In 1942 he joined Umetarō Azechi and Uichi Takayama in founding the Shin Hanga Kyōkai. During World War 2, he was a member of the Nihon Hanga Hokokai, an organization created to ensure access to production materials for hanga artists during the war. After the end of the war, he created the Nihon Hanga Kenkyusho to develop an avenue for hanga artists to publish and market their works. He also published reproductions of well-known ukiyo-e prints, an activity he suspended in 1948. In 1954 he founded the Okuyama Hanga Kōbō, a print workshop in Matsudo, where he printed his own landscapes alongside facsimiles of celebrated Eastern and Western artworks; his son Gijin, a pupil of Seijirō Sakakura who later became known for his own sōsaku-hanga series on the history of coffee, took over the workshop in 1973. In the late 1950s Okuyama also produced a series of woodblock prints, signed in English, based on well-known European paintings, many of them by Van Gogh.

After his death, Gijin continued his father's work, producing posthumous prints alongside his own projects from the same Matsudo studio.

== Artistic style ==
Okuyama was an extremely prolific artist, creating over 1000 works in his lifetime. He moved freely between the shin-hanga and sōsaku-hanga styles. His shin-hanga works are consistent with other artists in this style, with evocative colors and smooth gradations giving the works depth and realism. His sosaku hanga works are intentionally rustic, either in black and white or a limited color palette. These works often feature modern technological intrusions, like metal truss bridges or electric transmission towers, a juxtaposition of westernization into Japanese rural scenes.

== Bibliography ==
- Helen Merritt and Nanako Yamada, Guide to Modern Japanese Woodblock Prints: 1900-1975, published by University of Hawaii Press, Honolulu, 1992 ISBN 0-8248-1732-X.
- James King, Beyond the Great Wave: The Japanese Landscape Print, 1727-1960, published by Peter Lang, Bern, 2010 ISBN 978-3-03-430317-0
