= Atō Sengai =

Joyful Mandala (歓喜まんだら) by Atō Sengai, 1983-1984, silkscreen print, Honolulu Museum of art

Atō Sengai (阿刀暹涯, 1929–1996) was an artist and Buddhist monk born in Kyushu. He is best known for his contributions to, and advocacy of, the sōsaku-hanga (creative print) movement. Many of his prints have Mahayana themes, such as ‘’Joyful Mandala’’, in the collection of the Honolulu Museum of Art.
