= Umetaro Azechi =

Japanese printmaker and mountain climber

Umetaro Azechi (畦地 梅太郎, Azechi Umetarō; December 28, 1902 – April 12, 1999) was a Japanese printmaker and mountain climber. He was known for his prints of mountains and people who live in them.

== Biography ==
Azechi was born on December 28, 1902, to a poor farming family in what is now Uwajima, Ehime. He enrolled in an art correspondence course where he would send his work to Tokyo for critique. In 1920 he had the opportunity to move there, but returned home to Shikoku after the 1923 Great Kantō earthquake. He moved back to Tokyo in 1925, where he worked for a printing company.

Azechi's prints were noticed by Unichi Hiratsuka, who took him under his wing. He belonged to the Japan Print Association and the Kokugakai Arts Association. After his works were shown in some of their exhibitions, he quit his job and became a freelance artist. During this time, he was heavily influenced by Senpan Maekawa and Kōshirō Onchi.

During World War II, Azechi was sent to Manchuria. When he returned to Japan, he also immediately returned to making art.

Azechi's work was shown at the São Paulo Art Biennial in 1953. It was also shown at the Lugano International Print Biennial in 1956.

Azechi died on April 12, 1999. The Umetaro Azechi memorial museum opened in Uwajima in 2003.

== Style ==
His early work was reflective of the monochrome sosaku hanga style. He began to develop his own style in the late 1930s.

Azechi became known for his paintings of mountains and the people who live there. He became a regular mountain climber, and became well known for his writing on the topic. His art style was primitive, but intentionally so in the same way as the naive artists. He used the same striped patterns on both people and animals, showing the similarities between the two. Because he did so many landscapes and art depicting the natural world, he used mostly cool colors like blues, greens, and purples.

Museums that hold Azechi's works include the Museum of Modern Art, the Art Institute of Chicago, the Boston Museum of Fine Arts, the Minneapolis Institute of Art, and the British Museum.
