= Shikō Munakata =

Japanese artist

Munakata Shikō
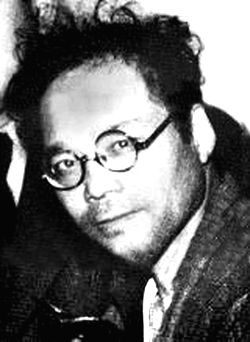
- Born: Munakata Shikō; September 5, 1903; Aomori, Japan
- Died: 13 September 1975 (aged 72); Tokyo, Japan
- Known for: Painter, Printmaker
- Notable work: Ten Great Disciples of the Buddha
- Movement: sōsaku-hanga, folk arts movement
- Awards: Order of Culture, many others

Shikō Munakata (棟方 志功, Munakata Shikō; September 5, 1903 – September 13, 1975) was a woodblock printmaker active in Shōwa period Japan. He is associated with the sōsaku-hanga movement and the mingei (folk art) movement. Munakata was awarded the "Prize of Excellence" at the Second International Print Exhibition in Lugano, Switzerland in 1952, and first prize at the São Paulo Bienal Exhibition in Brazil in 1955, followed by Grand Prix at the Venice Biennale in 1956, and the Order of Culture, the highest honor in the arts by the Japanese government in 1970.

== Early life ==
Munakata was born in the city of Aomori in Aomori Prefecture in northern Honshū as the third of 15 children to a local blacksmith. Due to the impoverished circumstances of his family, he had only an elementary school education; however, he exhibited a passion for art from early childhood. In third grade, he began illustrating kites for his classmates.

Munakata later claimed that his artistic endeavors were sparked by Vincent van Gogh's (1853–1890) Still Life: Vase with Five Flowers, a reproduction of which was given to him by his teacher when he was 17. Upon viewing of van Gogh's artwork, young Munakata decided that he wanted to become the “van Gogh of Aomori”. In 1924, Munakata moved to Tokyo in order to fulfill his decision to become a professional painter in oils.

Munakata's early career was not without obstacles. Unable to sell his paintings, he was forced to repair shoes and sell nattō part-time to survive. He was rejected by the Bunten (The Japan Art Academy Exhibition) four times, until one of his paintings was finally accepted in 1928. However, by this date, his attention had shifted away from oil painting to the traditional Japanese art of woodblock printing.

== The path towards woodblock prints ==
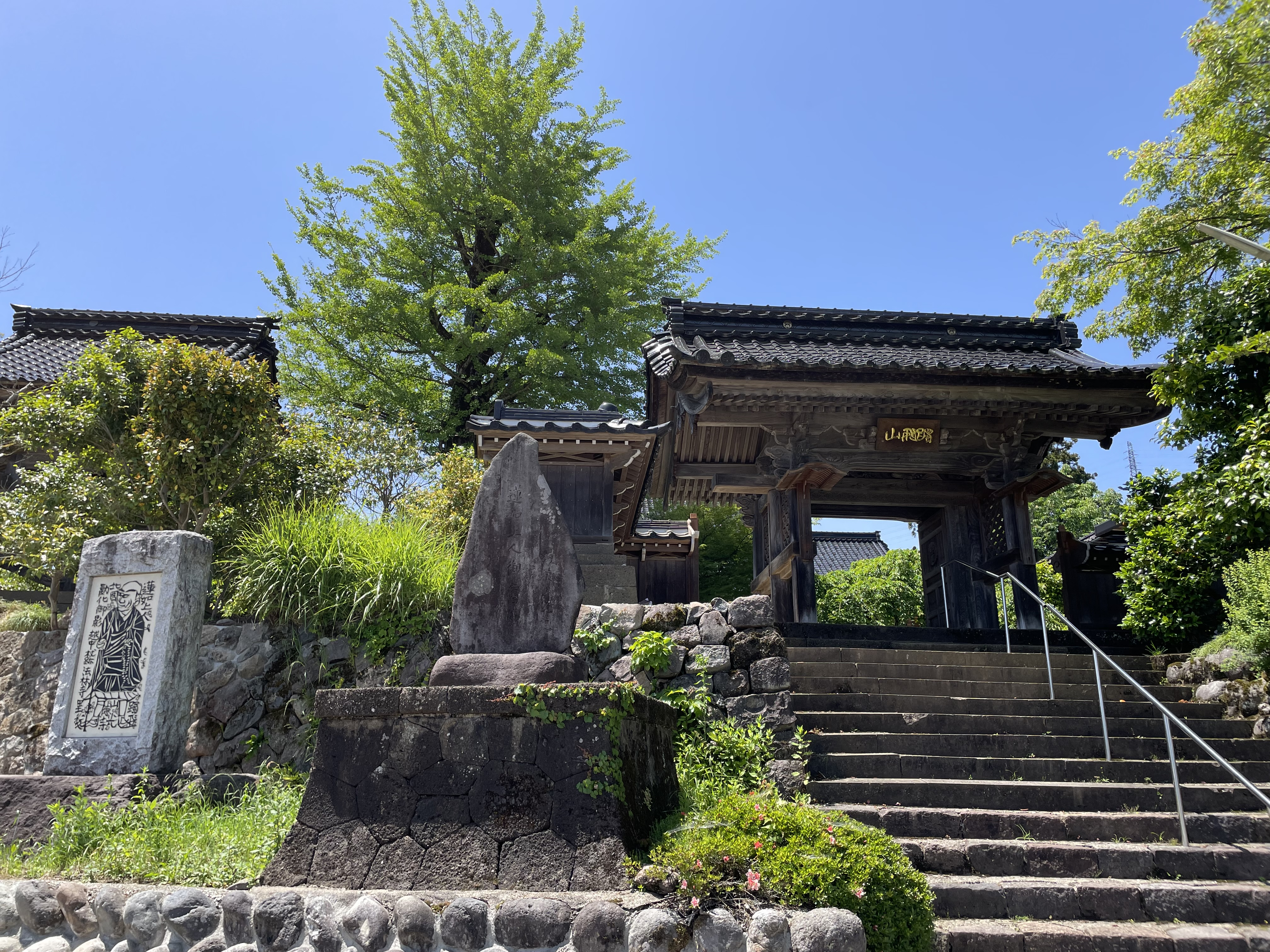
Koutokuji Temple in Fukumitsu Town, Toyama Prefecture, where Shikō Munakata stayed.

In 1926, Munakata saw Kawakami Sumio's black-and-white woodcut Early Summer Breeze, and decided to work on black-and-white prints. From 1928 onwards, Hiratsuka Unichi (1895–1997), another renowned sōsaku-hanga printmaker, taught Munakata wood carving. In 1929, four of his prints were accepted by the Shunyokai Exhibition, which bolstered his confidence in the new medium. In the following year, four more of his works were accepted for the Kokugakai national exhibition, thus establishing him in his career. His work was also part of the art competitions at the 1932 Summer Olympics and the 1936 Summer Olympics.

In 1935, Yanagi Sōetsu (1889–1961), father of the mingei (folk art) movement, saw Munakata's prints at the Kokugakai's annual spring exhibition, and bought twenty-five prints of Yamato shi Uruwashi by Munakata. This event changed Munakata's life. From then on Munakata was closely associated with the Japanese folk art movement. In 1936, Munakata went to Kyoto and visited many Buddhist temples and saw many sculptures. Munakata's exposure to Buddhist religious imagery influenced his artistic style significantly. Ten Great Disciples of the Buddha (1939) is considered to be his greatest masterpiece.

Munakata's house and most of his woodblocks were destroyed in the American firebombing of Tokyo in May 1945; his pet was also killed. During the war, he had used the original printing blocks of his Ten Great Disciples of the Buddha series to reinforce the walls of an air-raid shelter he had dug in his yard; although most of his other blocks were burned, the ten disciples and the two accompanying bodhisattva blocks survived. He relocated to Fukumitsu Town, Toyama Prefecture from 1945-1951.

== Postwar period ==
After World War II, Munakata produced numerous woodblock prints, paintings in watercolor and oil, calligraphy, and illustrated books. He moved his studio to Kamakura in Kanagawa to be closer to Tokyo. Shortly after the war, in 1945, he created the Shokei sho hangakan series, a set of twenty-four images intended to be mounted as a pair of six-panel folding screens, made as a tribute to his friend and patron, the potter Kawai Kanjirō. In this series he first developed the technique that became distinctive for the rest of his career: bold black outlines were carved in reserve and hand-colored on the reverse of the paper in blue, purple, or light brown, letting the fluid colors bleed through to the front. In 1952 Munakata joined Umetaro Azechi and Kihei Sasajima in founding the Nihon Hanga-in, also known as Banga-in. He traveled overseas to the United States and Europe in 1959, giving lectures at a number of overseas universities. His works received critical acclaim both in Japan and overseas, and he received many prizes.

Munakata was awarded the "Prize of Excellence" at the Second International Print Exhibition in Lugano, Switzerland, in 1952, and first prize at the São Paulo Bienal Exhibition in Brazil in 1955, followed by Grand Prix at the Venice Biennale in 1956. He was awarded the Order of Culture, the highest honor in the arts, by the Japanese government in 1970.

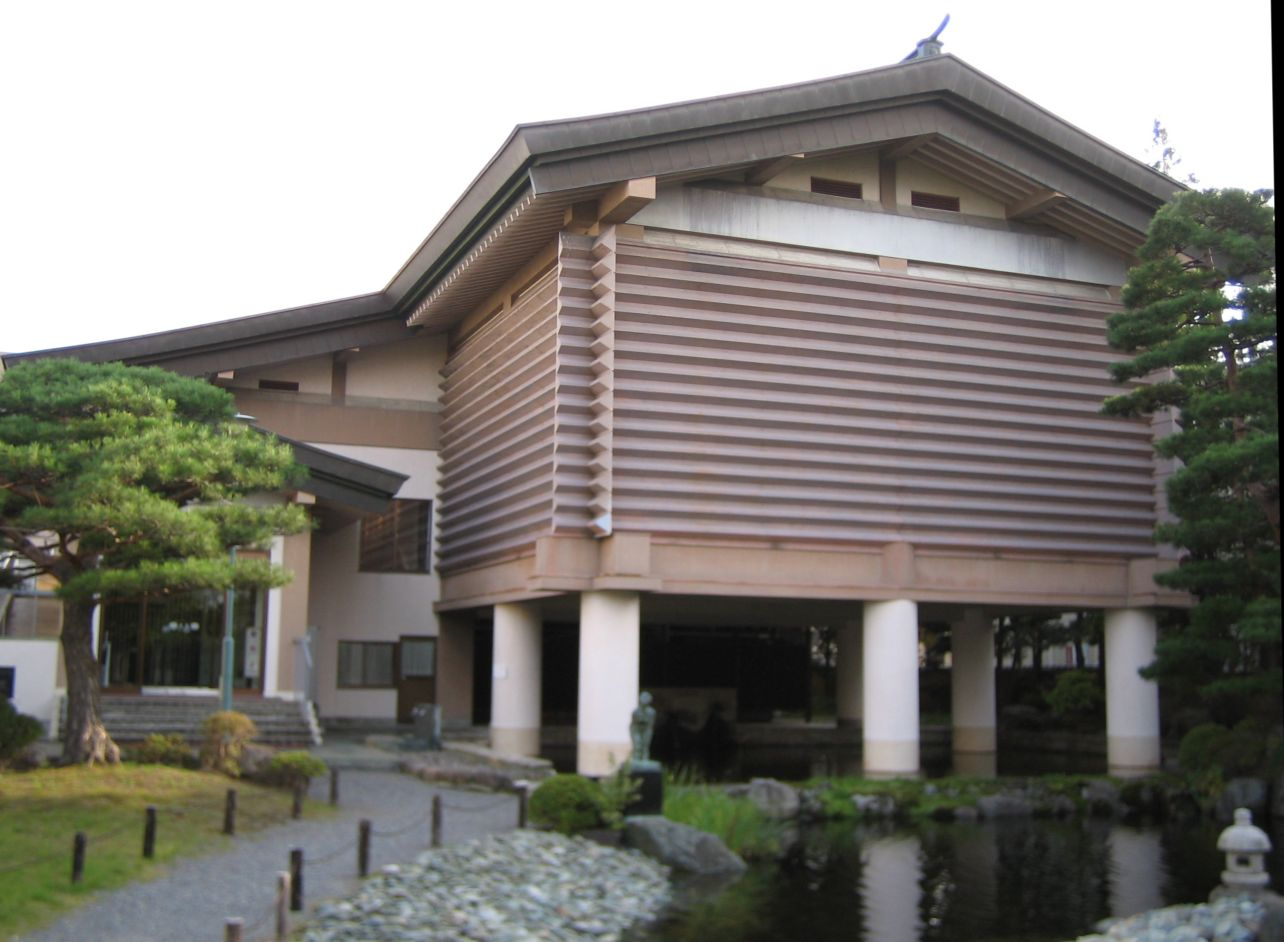
Munakata Shiko Memorial Museum of Art in Aomori

Munakata died at his home in Tokyo. His grave is in Aomori, and his gravestone is patterned after that of Vincent van Gogh.

== Subject matter and technique ==
Munakata took many of his themes from the traditions of his native Aomori in northern Japan, including the local people's love of nature and folk festivals such as the Nebuta festival. Munakata's belief and philosophy were engrained in Shin Buddhism. His prints feature images of floating nude females representing Shinto kami that inhabit trees and plants. Inspired by poetry of the Heian period, Munakata also incorporated poetry and calligraphy into his prints.

This extremely shortsighted artist brought his face almost into contact with the wood when he carved. In his words, “the mind goes and the tool walks alone”. Munakata carved with amazing speed and scarcely used any preparatory sketches, producing spontaneous vitality that is unique to his prints. During the early stage of his career, Munakata worked exclusively on black-and-white prints. Later on, upon the advice of Yanagi Sōetsu (1889–1961), Munakata colored his prints from the back, a technique called urazaishiki.

== Munakata's philosophy on woodblock prints ==
Unlike Kōshirō Onchi (1891–1955), father of the sōsaku-hanga movement, who advocated artists’ expression of the "self" in creating prints, Munakata disclaimed all responsibilities as creator of art. For Munakata, artistic creation is one but many of the manifestations of nature's force and beauty, which is inherent in the woodblock itself. Munakata called prints itaga instead of hanga, emphasizing the material instead of the process of printing, whereas ita refers to the woodblock itself). From 1943 he had similarly begun using the term banga in place of the more common hanga, a further sign of his search for a personal vocabulary to distinguish his production from that of other sōsaku-hanga artists.. In Munakata's words, "the essence of hanga lies in the fact that one must give in to the ways of the board ... there is a power in the board, and one cannot force the tool against that power." Munakata's subject matter and artistic style are very much characterized by his philosophy on the supremacy of the woodblock material and nature's inherent force and beauty.

== Quotations of Shiko Munakata ==
"Like the vastness of space, like a universe unlimited, untold, unattainable, and inscrutable- that is the woodcut."

"The nature of the woodcut is such, that even a mistake in its carving will not prevent it from its true materialization."

"The concern that it be ugly is characteristic of human thoughts and not of the woodcut itself."

"It is inherent in the woodcut that it can never be ugly"

"The woodcut, unconcerned with good and evil, with ideas, with differences, tells us that it consists of truth alone,"

"It is precisely the beauty of this <way> which will further enlarge the limitlessness of the world of beauty."

(from Shiko Munakata, Munakata: the “Way” of the Woodcut, Brooklyn, Pratt Adlib Press, 1961).

== Philately ==
One of Munakata’s works, “Benzaiten”, appeared on a 1982 commemorative postage stamp issued by the Japanese government as part of a series on modern Japanese art.

== Gallery ==
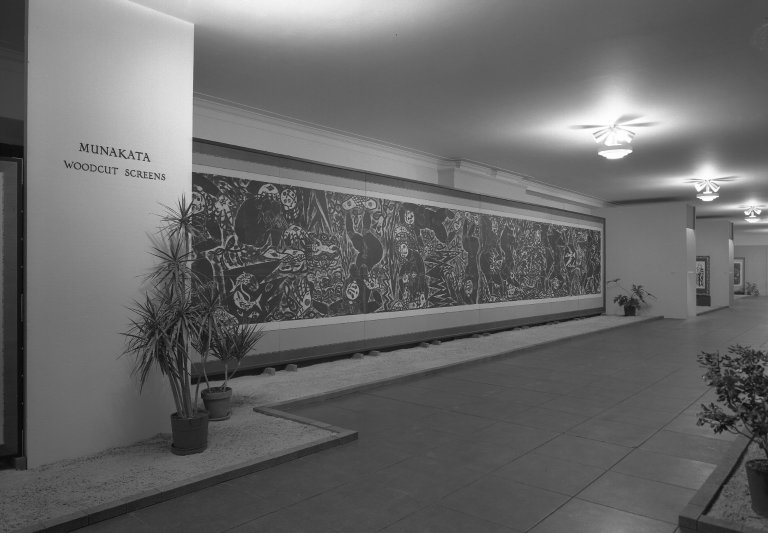
Woodcut Screens of Shiko Munakata at the Brooklyn Museum, January 9 - February 18, 1968.

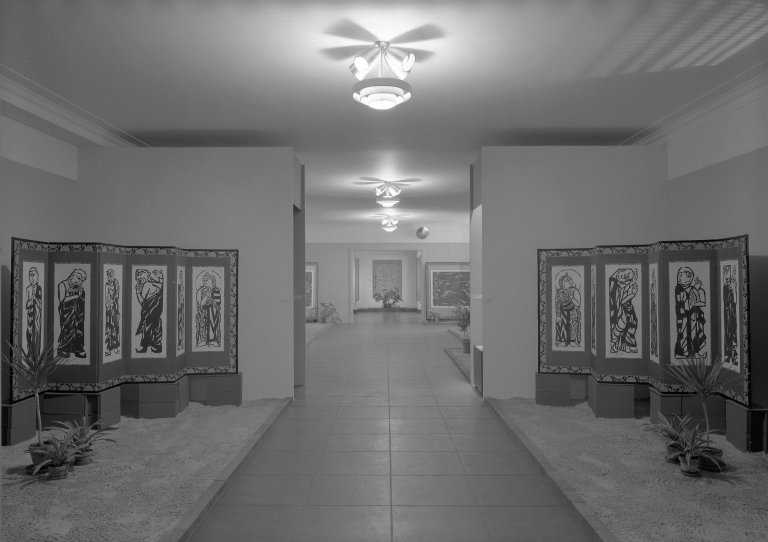
Woodcut Screens of Shiko Munakata at the Brooklyn Museum, January 9 - February 18, 1968.

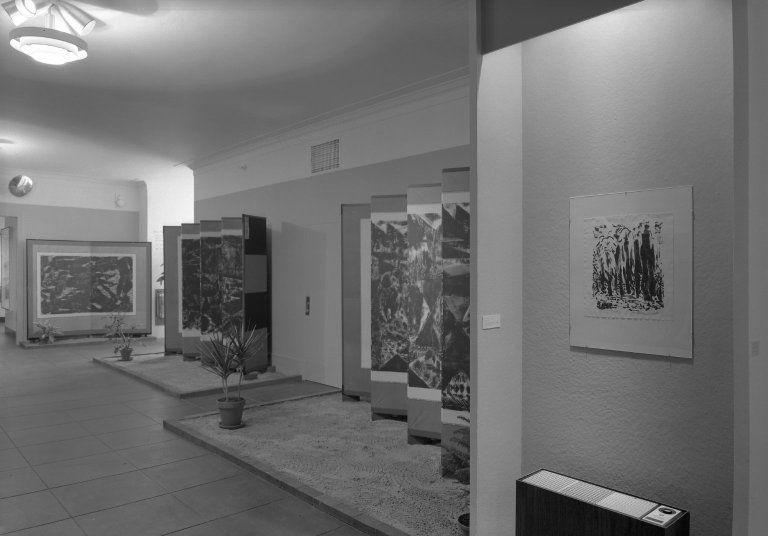
Woodcut Screens of Shiko Munakata at the Brooklyn Museum, January 9 - February 18, 1968.
