= Yasuhide Kobashi =

American painter

Night of the Carnival, print by Yasuhide Kobashi, 1958

Yasuhide Kobashi (古橋 矢須秀, Kobashi Yasuhide; 1931–2003) was a Japanese woodblock print artist, painter, sculptor and stage designer.

== Early life ==
He was born in Kojima in Okayama Prefecture, 1931. His father was a ceramic artist and head of the Kyoto Industrial Craft Company. Kobashi learned printmaking from the sōsaku hanga (creative prints) master Unichi Hiratsuka.

In 1955, Kobashi graduated from the Kyoto College of Crafts and Textiles, and in 1959, he moved to New York City. Nelson Rockefeller (governor of New York and later vice-president) was Kobashi's patron, and acquired one of the artist's sculptures for the New York State Executive Mansion in Albany.

== Career ==
Kobashi is best known for his sōsaku hanga woodblock prints and his sculptures intended to be rearranged, which he called "self-constructions". The Cleveland Museum of Art, the Honolulu Museum of Art, the Metropolitan Museum of Art, the Museum of Modern Art (New York City), the Neuberger Museum of Art (Purchase, New York), the Weisman Art Museum (University of Minnesota, Minneapolis), and Southern Illinois University Edwardsville are among the public collections holding work by Kobashi.
