= Tadashige Ono =

Japanese artist (1909–1990)

Tadashige Ono (小野 忠重, Ono Tadashige; January 19, 1909, Tokyo – October 17, 1990) was a Japanese woodblock print artist prominent in the sōsaku hanga movement in twentieth century Japan.

== Style and technique ==
Ono's early prints (prior to World War II), were deeply rooted in the social-critical movement of German expressionism and the art trend dominating in Russia and among critical, intellectual circles in China Lu Xun.

Later prints saw a lessened proletarian engagement, but the artist's interest in cityscapes, and the newly industrialised face of Japan remained constant throughout his career.
