= Eiichi Kotozuka =

Japanese artist (b. 1906, d. 1981)

Eiichi Kotozuka (琴塚 英一, Kotozuka Eiichi; 1906 – 1 October 1981) was a 20th-century Japanese commercial artist and woodblock printmaker. He was a prolific artist of the sōsaku-hanga style. He was one of four artists who co-founded the print publishing company Koryokusha. He was noted for his prints of Japanese cultural traditions, flowers, landscapes, and wildlife.

== Biography ==
Kotozuka was born in Osaka in 1906. His prints of Japanese cultural traditions, kachō-ga, meisho-e and wildlife were published chiefly by Uchida and Unsōdō. From 1932 he exhibited with the Shun'yōkai, an organisation of Western-style painters, and in 1934 he took part for the first time in the Teiten exhibition. He was a member of the Seiryusha Group of Liberal Artists, taking part regularly from 1938 in the Seiryūsha exhibitions organised by Kawabata Ryūshi. Alongside his preferred sōsaku-hanga prints, he also worked with the publisher Uchida to produce shin-hanga prints, using the proceeds to help finance his sōsaku-hanga work.

== Artistic style ==
Kotozuka was an adherent of the sosaku hanga style of illustration, which emphasized a print process with greater direct artist involvement, resulting in a somewhat more crude illustration, but one with stronger emotional impact. Prior to sosaku hanga, an artist would create an illustration which would be passed to a team of engravers, printers, and publishers who would each control the production of the final print. In sosaku hanga, the artist was directly involved with each step.

== Bibliography ==
- Helen Merritt and Nanako Yamada, "Guide to Modern Japanese Woodblock Prints: 1900–1975", published by University of Hawaii Press, Honolulu, ISBN 0-8248-1732-X.
- J. P. Filedt Kok and Jan Frederik Heijbroek, "The Age of Yoshitoshi: Japanese Prints from the Meiji and Taishō Periods : Nagasaki, Yokohama and Kamigata Prints", published by Rijksprentenkabinet/Rijksmuseum
