= Itow Takumi =

Japanese printmaker

Itō Takumi (伊藤 卓美; born on January 15, 1946, in the Miyagi Prefecture, Japan) is a Japanese printmaker and president of the Japan Print Society. His artwork has been featured on Japan Post postage stamps as well as featured in exhibitions at the Library of Congress and the Peabody Essex Museum in Salem, Massachusetts. Takumi currently teaches woodblock printing at Waseda University in Tokyo.

Takumi's interest in the woodblock printing began at a young age when his father, a painter, encouraged his study of the arts. Having a special interest in Japanese matsuri festivals and folk art, especially mingei, many of Takumi's prints explore the local cultures of Japan's rural areas, such as his own Miyagi Prefecture.
