= Un'ichi Hiratsuka =

Japanese artist (1895–1997)

- Born: November 17, 1895; Matsue, Japan
- Died: November 18, 1997 (aged 102); Tokyo, Japan
- Occupation: woodblock printmaker
- Movement: sōsaku hanga

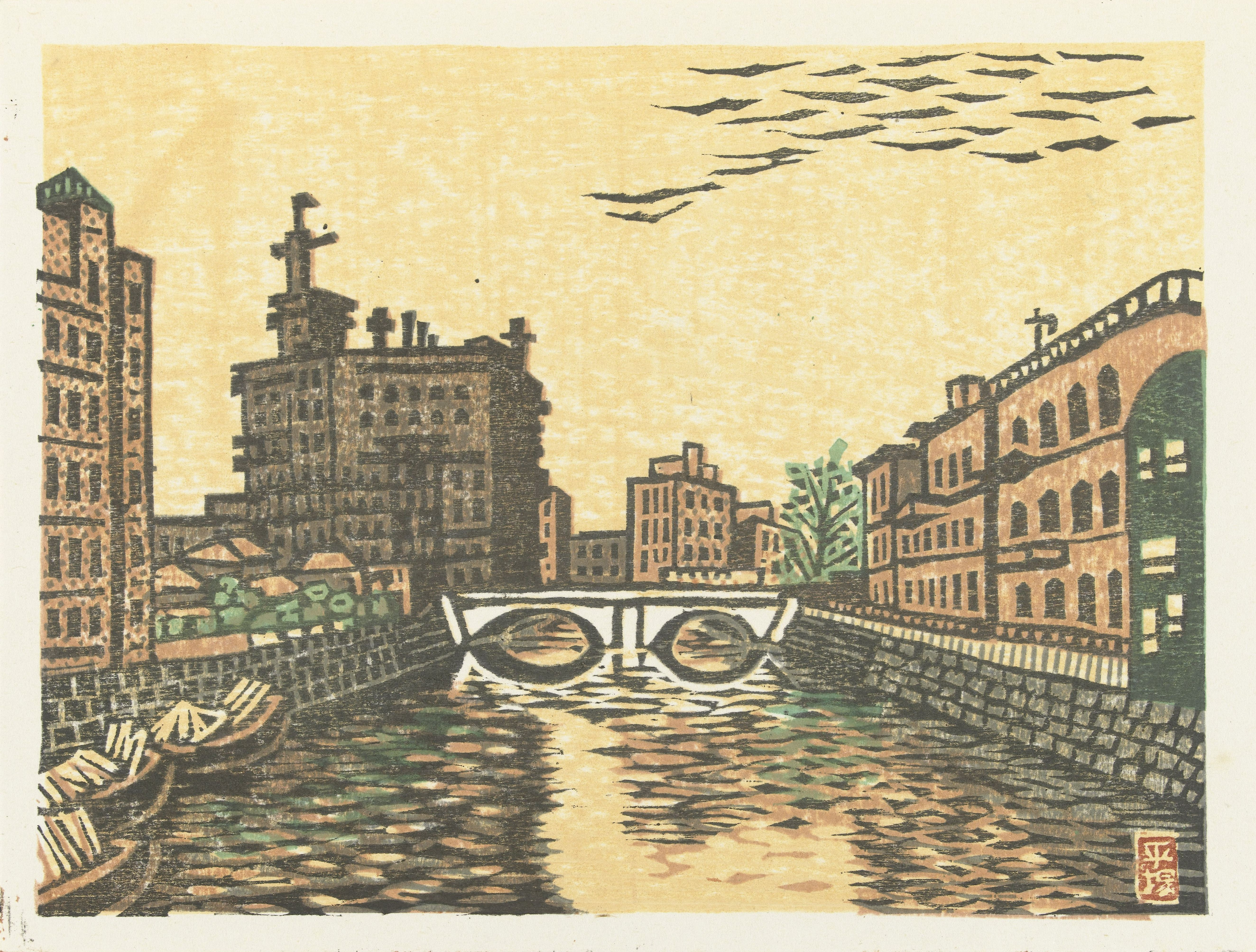
Sukiya Bridge, woodblock print by Un'ichi Hiratsuka by 1945

Un'ichi Hiratsuka (平塚 運一, Hiratsuka Un'ichi; November 17, 1895 – November 18, 1997), born in Matsue, Shimane, was a Japanese woodblock printmaker. He was one of the prominent leaders of the sōsaku hanga ("creative print") movement in 20th century Japan.

== Early life ==
Hiratsuka's father was a shrine carpenter, and his grandfather was an architect who designed houses and temples. Therefore, the artist was introduced to wood-working and architecture early in his life.

Hiratsuka began by carving seals, at first cutting only Chinese characters before moving on to images, drawn to avant-garde art magazines such as Myōjō and Shirakaba, which were introducing the Post-Impressionists to Japan at the time. It was only after meeting the artist Ishii in Matsue in 1913, studying with him for the month he spent teaching there, and gaining confidence when Ishii praised one of his watercolours, that the eighteen-year-old Hiratsuka resolved to become an artist. At twenty-one he moved to Tokyo to enrol at Okada's art school, where he remained for five or six years; throughout that period he stayed close to Ishii, continuing to show him his work and seek his advice, and it was through Ishii that Hiratsuka came into contact with the horishi (professional woodcarver) Bonkotsu.

== Career and teaching ==
Hiratsuka was the best–trained woodcarver in the sōsaku hanga movement. From 1928 onwards he taught the renowned sōsaku hanga artist Shikō Munakata (1903–1975) wood carving. The same year he joined with seven other like-minded artists to work on the 100 Views of New Tokyo series, to which he contributed twelve prints; his prints were lauded for their "technical beauty and perfection." Between 1935 and 1944 Hiratsuka taught the first blockprinting course at the Tokyo School of Fine Arts.

In the 1930s he also led an informal circle of artists, known as the Yoyogi-ha, which met at his house in Tokyo's Yoyogi district. In 1943 he was offered a teaching post at the Central Academy of Fine Arts in Beijing to instruct students in printmaking techniques, but declined, unwilling to work directly for the wartime government. In 1948 he founded his own school in Tokyo and also established the Matsue Bijutsu Kōgei in his hometown.

== Washington, D.C. and later life ==
He moved to Washington D.C. in 1962, where his daughter Keiko Moore lived with her American husband, and spent thirty three years in the United States, continuing to work and exhibit into his nineties. His 1962 print Rock Creek in Montrose Park, Washington, D.C. shows the stream rendered in agitated black lines whose visual impact is heightened by his tsukibori technique, the movement of the water overwhelming the stillness of the surrounding rocks; the composition is filled with detail edge to edge, and the narrow white spaces are as essential to the design's impact as the black lines and forms themselves. During this American period Hiratsuka also produced a series of one hundred female nudes. While living in Washington DC, he was commissioned by three standing Presidents to carve woodblock prints of National Landmarks, which included the Lincoln Memorial, Washington Monument and Library of Congress which are in the collections of The National Gallery and Freer Gallery today. He ultimately returned to Japan in 1994.

Hiratsuka died on 18 November 1997 at the age of 102; his wife, Teruno, followed him shortly after. In 1999 the National Museum of American Art held a retrospective exhibition of his work.

== Honours ==
In 1970 Hiratsuka became the first print artist to receive the Order of Cultural Merit, and in 1977 he was the first artist to be given the Order of the Sacred Treasure for "the quality of his art, the techniques he was able to pass along to his students and followers, and his accomplishments in promoting friendship between the United States and Japan." In 1991, the Hiratsuka Unichi Print Museum was opened in Suzaka, Nagano.

== Subject matter and collecting ==
Many of his woodblock prints are of temples, and bridges, in addition to landscapes he captured in his travels throughout Japan, Korea, and the United States. Hiratsuka was also a serious collector of old Buddhist prints, and his works are influenced by his exposure to Buddhist figures. He also had an extensive collection of roof tiles, Judaica and Bibles in every language, and when he was not practicing his art, spent hours reading.

== Style and technique ==
Hiratsuka's techniques and styles evolved over his lifetime. Pre-World War II he made many color woodblock prints and engravings, postwar he worked almost exclusively on black-and-white prints. He considered monochrome printing to be the "zenith of the art of picture printing", and was celebrated for his work in this medium.

Among his prewar colour work, in 1931 Hiratsuka began a devotional print of the Buddhist priest Nichiren Shōnin, which he had planned to produce in an edition of ten thousand copies. His 1935 print Ame no Yabakei, Rakan-ji depicts a Sōtō temple destroyed roughly eight years later, making the image an important historical record; the temple appears half-hidden in the lower left of the composition, with a grey-blue sky and falling rain occupying most of the pictorial space. In 1942 he depicted the snow-covered pagoda of Danjō Garan, the central sacred precinct of Mount Kōya, using the white of the snow in a manner not unlike the untouched white areas of his monochrome prints. Hiratsuka's 1958 print of the Shōsōin at Tōdai-ji in Nara, the famed eighth-century imperial treasure repository, is regarded as a high point of his mature style: the print's stark contrast of white paper and dense black, its bold, low-angle perspective, and its overhanging roofline extending to the top edge of the composition are further intensified by tsukibori carving used selectively across the architectural details, producing a rough, jagged line born of a search for greater visual force and a sense of solid mass.

With its special beauties, a black and white has special problems. To borrow musical terms, a black and white must have a rhythm of line and mass and a harmony of straight lines and curves. One of the great difficulties is to make the white space live.... The handling of white space is different in every one of my pictures.

His most famous technique is called tsukibori ("poking strokes"). With a small square-end chisel (aisuki), Hiratsuka rocked the blade side to side in short strokes, producing rough and jagged edges. His students include Kobashi Yasuhide.

== Further readings ==
- Merritt, H., et al. Hiratsuka: Modern Master. Chicago: Art Institute of Chicago, 2001.
- Michener, James A., The Modern Japanese Print: An Appreciation, Tuttle Publishing, Rutland, Vermont, 1968, pp. 15-18
