= Kōshirō Onchi =

Japanese artist

- 恩地 孝四郎
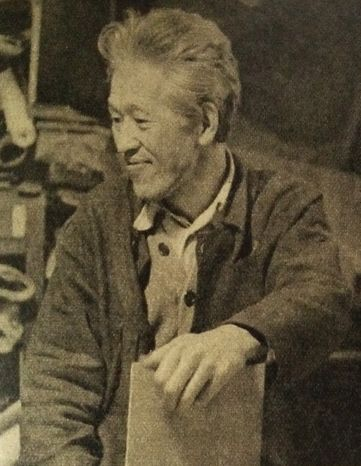
- Born: 2 July 1891; Tokyo, Empire of Japan
- Died: 3 June 1955 (aged 63); Tokyo, Japan
- Style: Sōsaku-hanga

Kōshirō Onchi (恩地 孝四郎, 2 July 1891 – 3 June 1955), who is also known as Onchi Kōshirō was Tokyo-born Japanese artist who is best known for his prints. He was the father of the sōsaku-hanga movement in twentieth-century Japan, and a photographer. His work was part of the painting event in the art competition at the 1932 Summer Olympics.

== Biography ==
Onchi came from an aristocratic family that had close connections with the imperial family. As a child, he received the same kind of education that a prince received. Onchi was trained in both traditional calligraphy and modern western art. Onchi's father, Tetsuo Onchi, was himself a calligrapher, painter and scholar of Chinese studies, and served as tutor to three young princes who were to marry daughters of the Emperor Meiji. Onchi completed elementary school at Bancho in 1904, then attended a school for German studies in Tokyo in 1909; after failing the entrance examination for the Daiichi Kōtōgakkō, he studied oil painting at the Aoibashi branch of the Hakubakai Yōga Kenkyūsho. In December 1909 he sent the painter Takehisa Yumeji his impressions of Takehisa's recently published book Yumeji Gashū - Haru no Maki, the beginning of the contact that, between 1910 and 1915, encouraged him to study oil painting and sculpture at the Tokyo School of Fine Arts. After contacts with Takehisa Yumeji in 1909, between 1910 and 1915, he studied oil painting and sculpture at the Tokyo School of Fine Arts (東京美術学校, Tōkyō Bijutsu Gakkō). In 1912, he founded the print and poetry magazine called "Tsukubae".

Onchi was also a book designer in the early days when it was impossible for sōsaku-hanga artists to survive by just doing creative prints. He designed over 1000 books in his career. In 1928 he joined with seven other sōsaku hanga artists to work on the 100 Views of New Tokyo series, to which he contributed thirteen prints. He was described as having the most "forceful personality" of the group, with the "widest intellectual interests and the deepest intellectual convictions."

In 1939, he founded the First Thursday Society (一木会, Ichimokukai), which was crucial to the postwar revival of the sōsaku-hanga movement. The society held artist gatherings once a month in Onchi’s house. Members such as Gen Yamaguchi (1896–1976) and Sekino Jun'ichirō (1914–1988) discussed subjects of prints. The American connoisseurs Ernst Hacker, William Hartnett and Oliver Statler also attended. The First Thursday Collection (一木集, Ichimoku-shū), a collection of prints by members to circulate to each other, was produced in 1944. Through the First Thursday Society, Onchi provided aspiring young artists with resources and comradeship during the war years when resources were scarce and censorship severe. Like many artists, Onchi was conscripted into national service during the Second World War; from 1942 he served as president of the Nihon Hanga Hōkokai and took part in the collaborative print series Tokyo Kaiko Zue in an attempt to revitalize woodblock printing in the immediate postwar period. After the war, he emerged as the leader of the sōsaku-hanga movement that flourished in the international art scene. The 1951 São Paulo Biennial marked a decisive step in gaining recognition for the movement within Japan itself."

== Style and technique ==
Onchi's prints range from early representational to postwar abstract prints. As an early advocate of the sōsaku-hanga movement, Onchi believed that artistic creation originates from the self. He was more interested in expressing subjective emotions through abstract prints than in replicating images and forms in the objective world. His prints evoke lyrical and poetic mood. He said:

Art is not to be understood by the mind but by the heart. If we go back to its origin, painting is expressed in color and form by the heart, and it should never be limited to a world of reflected forms captured by visual sense. Therefore, expression of the heart through color and forms separated from color and form in the real world is that true realm of painting. I will for the time call this type of work the 'lyrique'.

Onchi innovated by incorporating fabrics, string, paper blocks, fish fins, and leaves in his prints. In the print Nijūbashi, Onchi placed a willow in the foreground, obscuring the view of the bridge, while the palace's stone walls fill the left third of the composition; uninterested in literal representation, the artist used the walls almost as sculpture, building texture to capture an impression of the famous landmark rather than a topographical record. In Ueno Dōbutsuen he captured the relaxed mood of a typical Sunday, with city-dwelling parents and children enjoying the park-like grounds of Ueno Zoo and its many native and foreign species. In December 1953 Onchi made a self-portrait by coating an ordinary wooden board with a heavy layer of glue, around which he wound thick butcher's cord to form the rough outline of a human face before printing from the resulting relief.

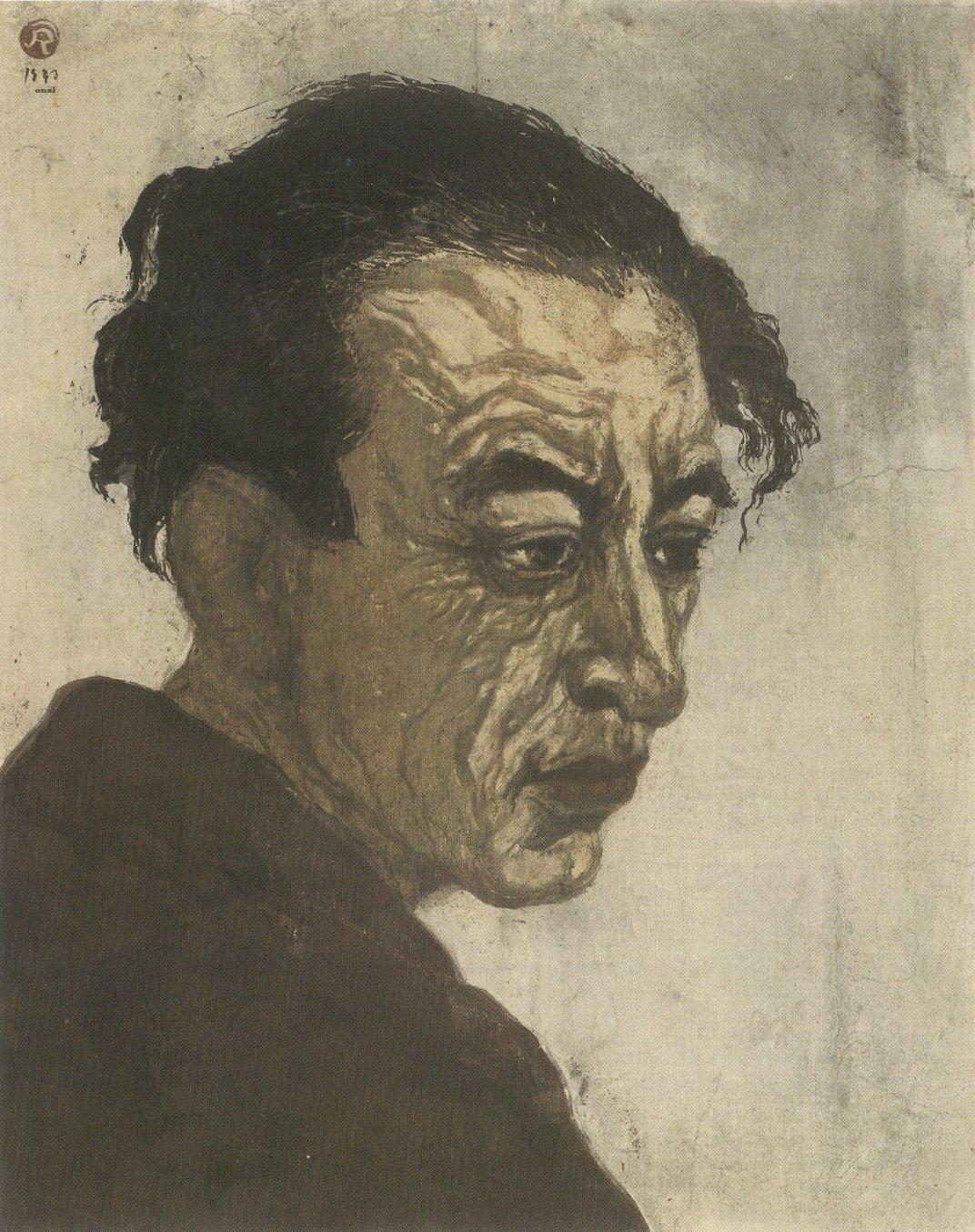
Portrait of Sakutarō Hagiwara, woodblock print, 1943

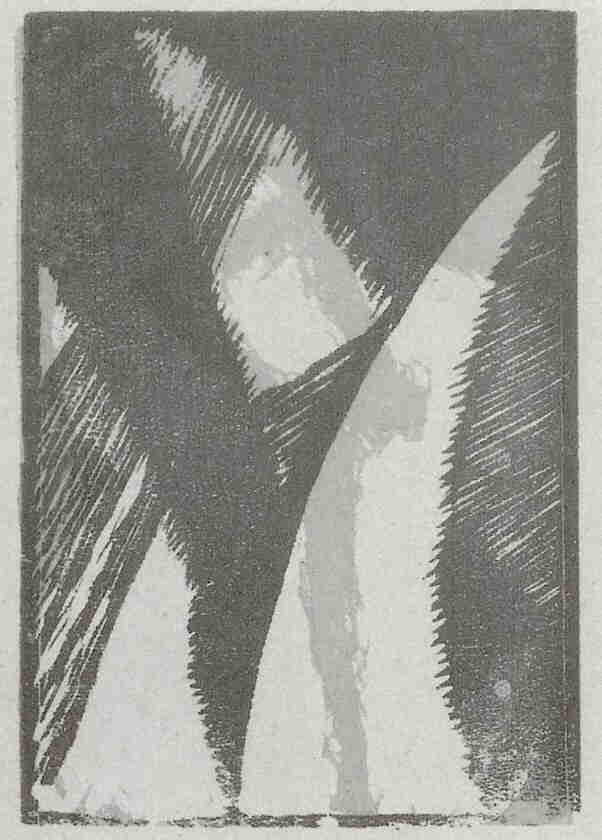
Fool, 1914

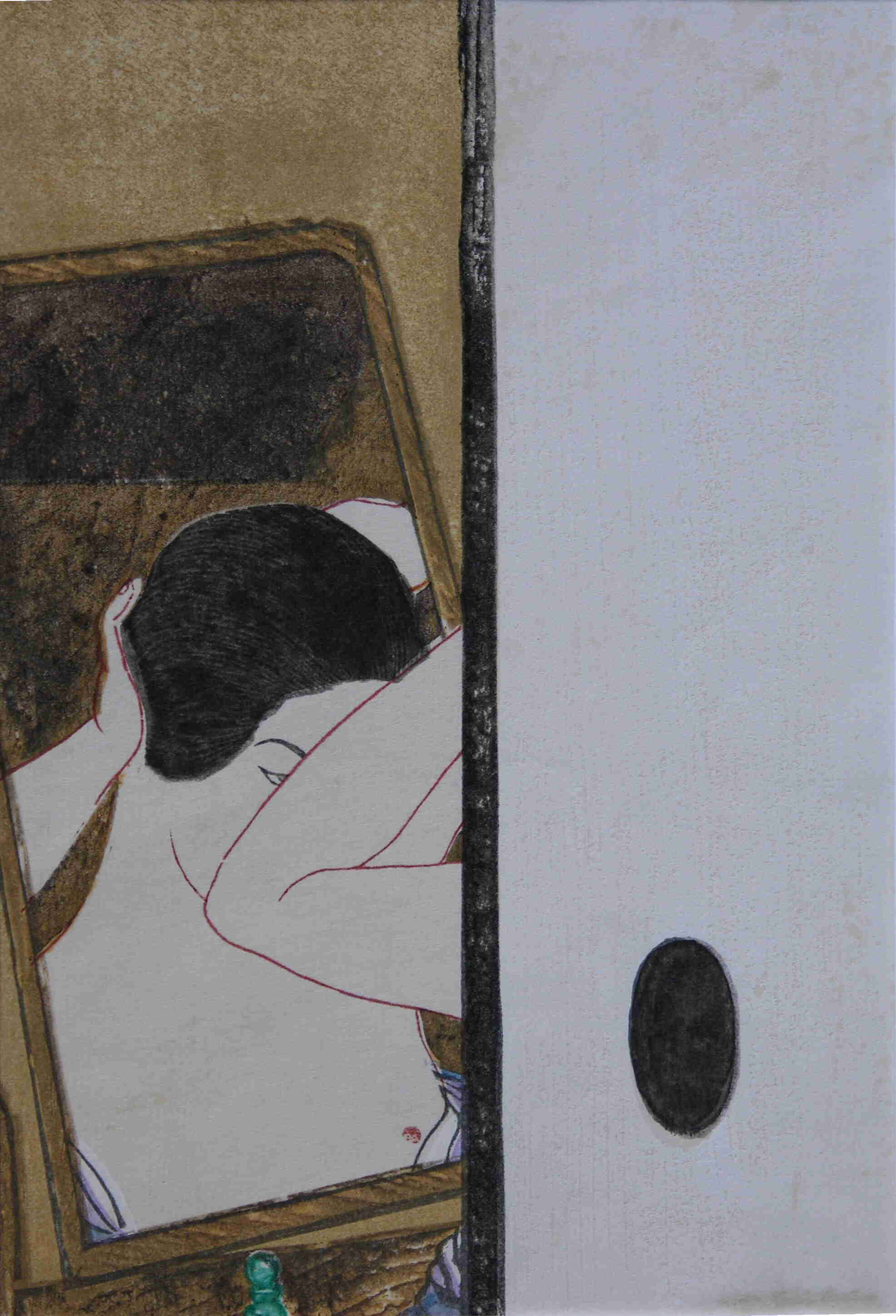
Before the Mirror, 1928

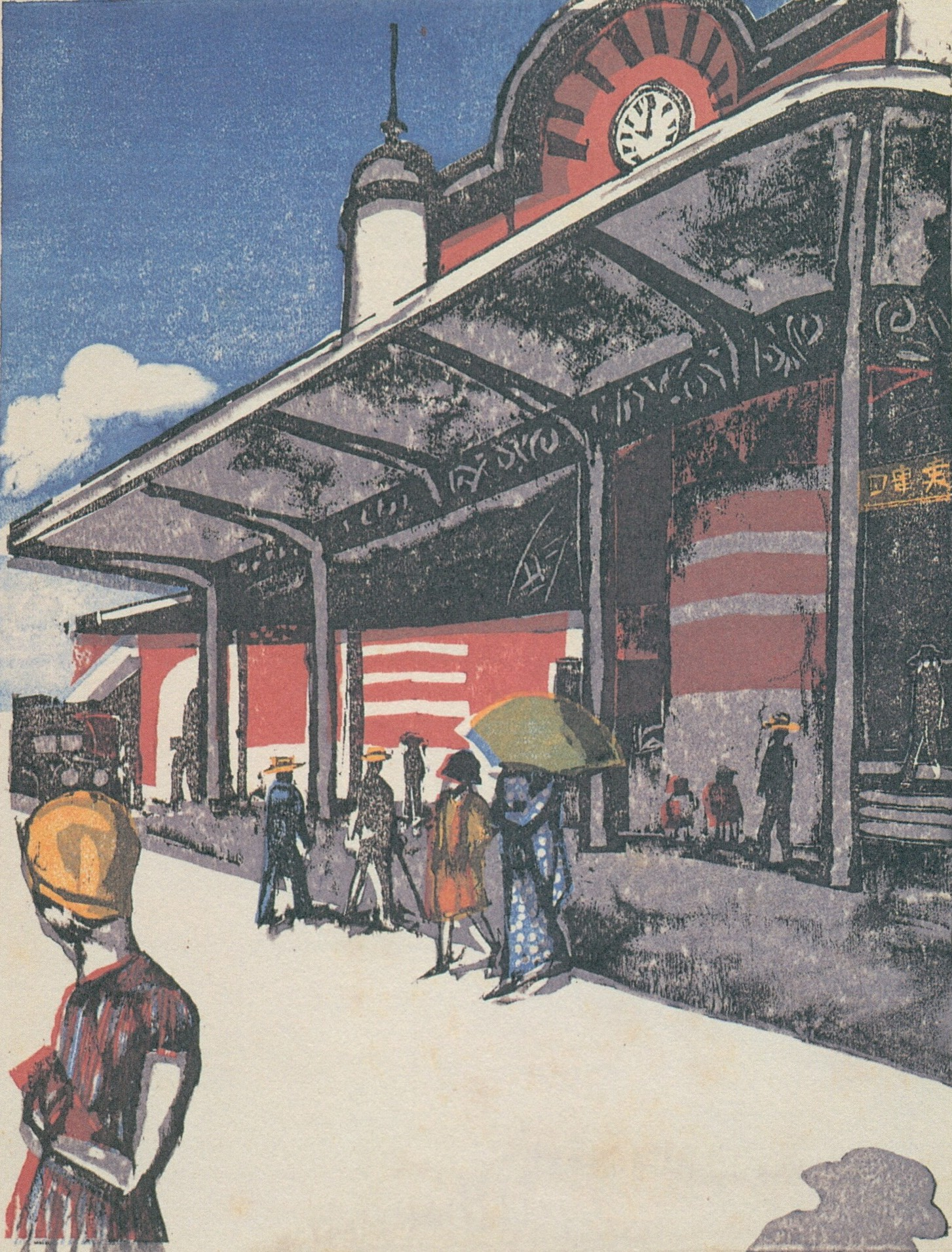
Tokyo Station, between 1928 and 1932

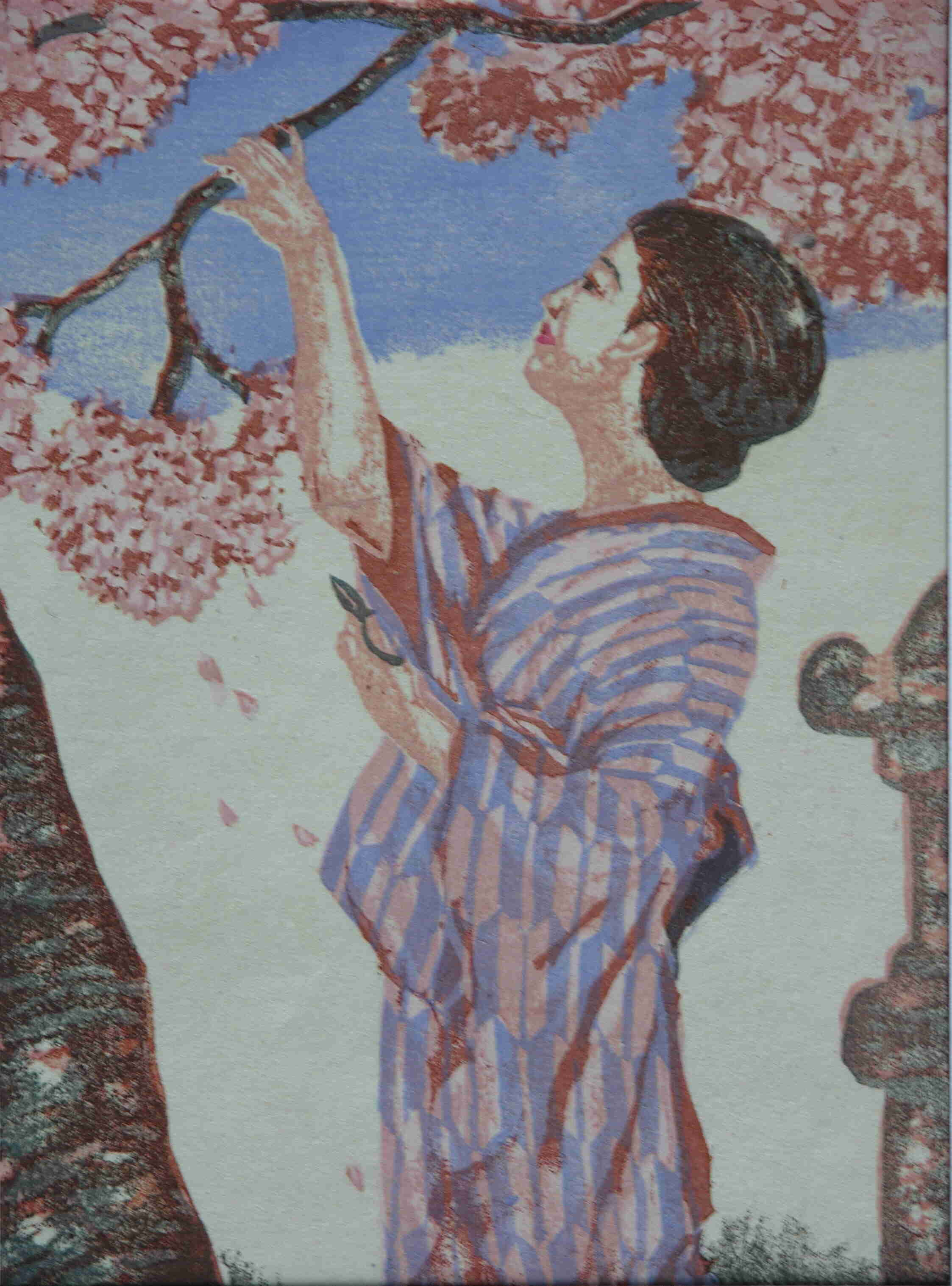
Cherry Blossom Time, 1946

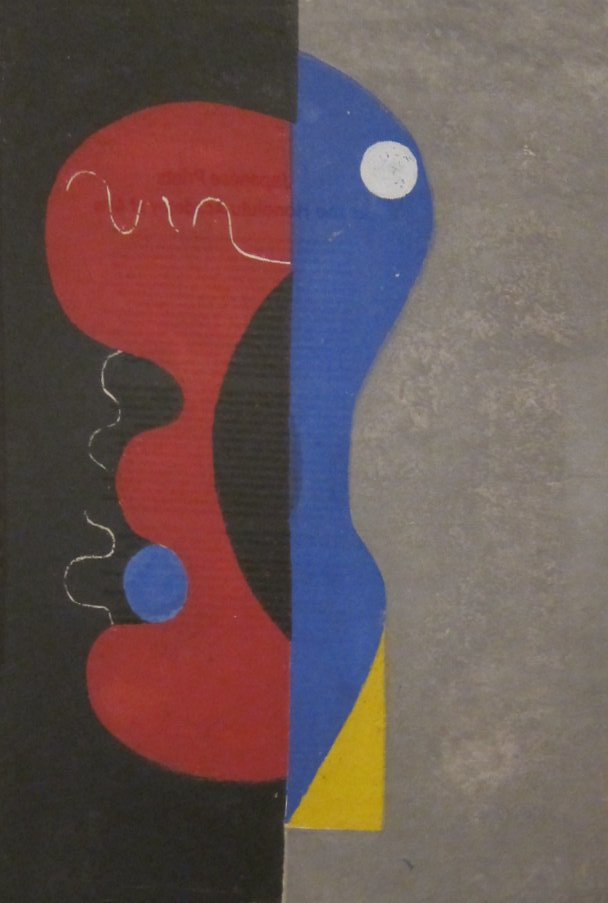
Lyric No. 23, 1952

== Photography ==
From around 1932, Onchi worked on the design of a number of books about photography published by Genkōsha (玄光社) and Ars. He also became interested in photography. Through the 1930s and 1940s, Onchi worked in the spirit of shinkō shashin. He worked on plants, animals and objets, and also created photograms. Later museum accounts, including the Tokyo section of the Tokyo Photographic Art Museum exhibition Avant-Garde Rising: The Photographic Vanguard in Modern Japan, situated such work within the wider milieu of avant-garde photography in Tokyo.

Onchi was sent to China in 1939 and later the same year returned to Tokyo and had an exhibition of his Chinese works.

Onchi exhibited his photograms in 1951 but otherwise dropped out of photography. He died in Tokyo on 3 June 1955.

== Collections ==
Onchi's works are held in several museums worldwide, including the National Museum of Modern Art, Tokyo,, the Tokyo Photographic Art Museum, the National Museum of Modern Art, Kyoto, the University of Michigan Museum of Art, the Museum of Fine Arts, Boston, the Smart Museum of Art, the British Museum, the Museum of Modern Art, the Portland Art Museum, the Saint Louis Art Museum, the Brooklyn Museum, the Worcester Art Museum, the Harvard Art Museums, and the Art Gallery of New South Wales.
