= Kodomo no kuni (children's magazine) =

Japanese children's publication 1922–1944

'Kodomo no kuni'
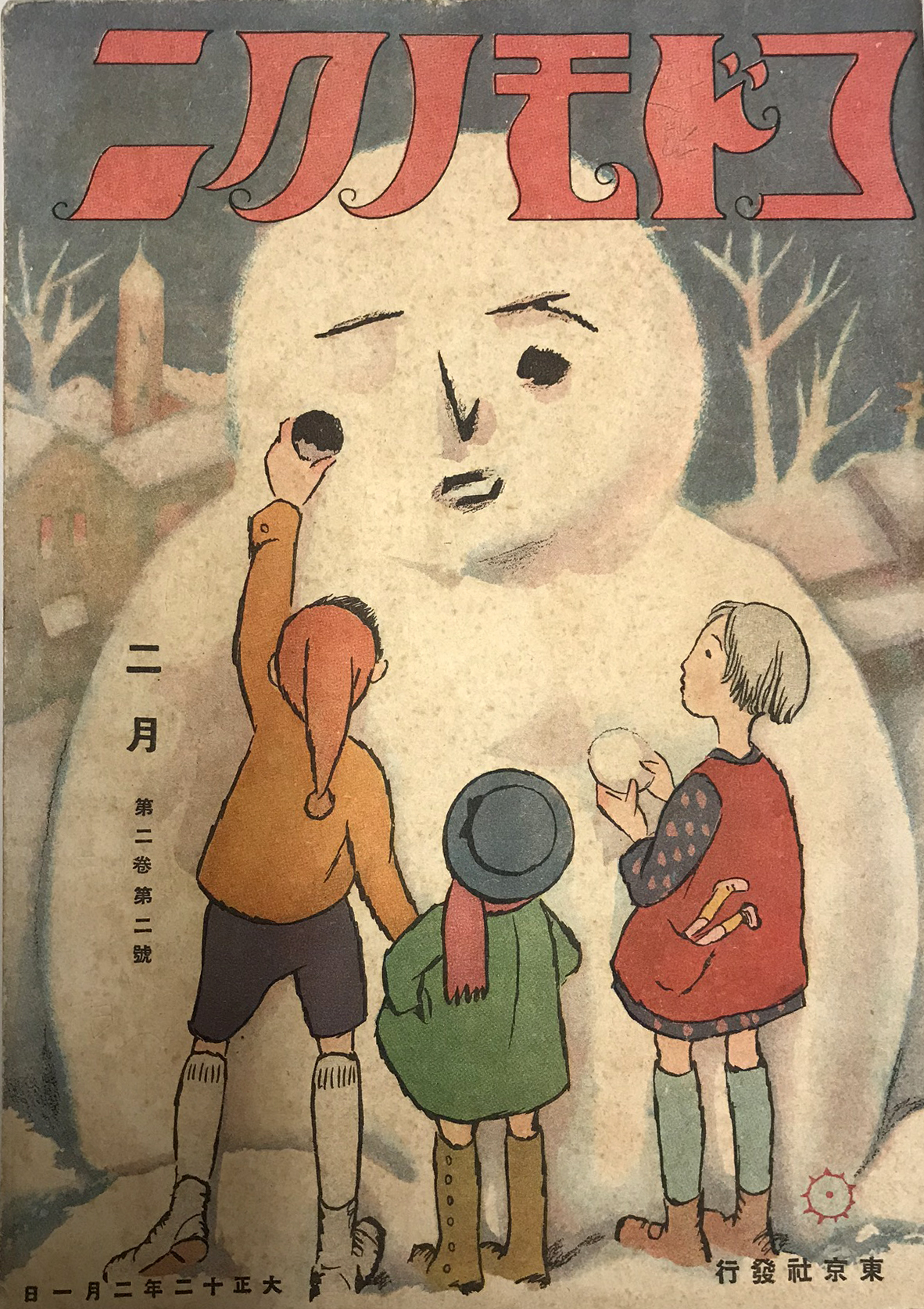
- February 1923 cover by Yumeji Takehisa.
- Editor-in-chief: Koko Wada
- Illustration editor: Kiichi Okamoto
- Categories: Children's; Literary
- Frequency: Monthly
- Format: 26 × 18.5 cm
- Total circulation: 20,000 (1922)
- First issue: January 1, 1922; 104 years ago
- Final issue Number: March 1, 1944; 82 years ago Vol. 23 no. 3 (#287)
- Country: Japan
- Based in: Tokyo
- Language: Japanese

Kodomo no kuni was a popular children's magazine published in Japan from January 1922 until March 1944. There were 23 volumes of the publication spread across 287 individual issues. The name of the publication is alternately translated as both "The Land of Children" and "Children's Country" in English.

== Publication ==
Kodomo no kuni was a themed literary magazine created broadly for children, not specifically boys or girls as was often the case with other contemporary publications. Its primary audience was middle-class children, as the first issue initially cost 50 sen in 1922. Each issue was printed on large, 26 x 18.5 cm (10.3 x 7.3 in) extra-thick paper that was capable of withstanding the grabbing hands of small children. Many of the remaining copies of Kodomo no kuni still feature the bright, bold colors as they were printed nearly one hundred years ago because of the publication's use of unusually durable paper.

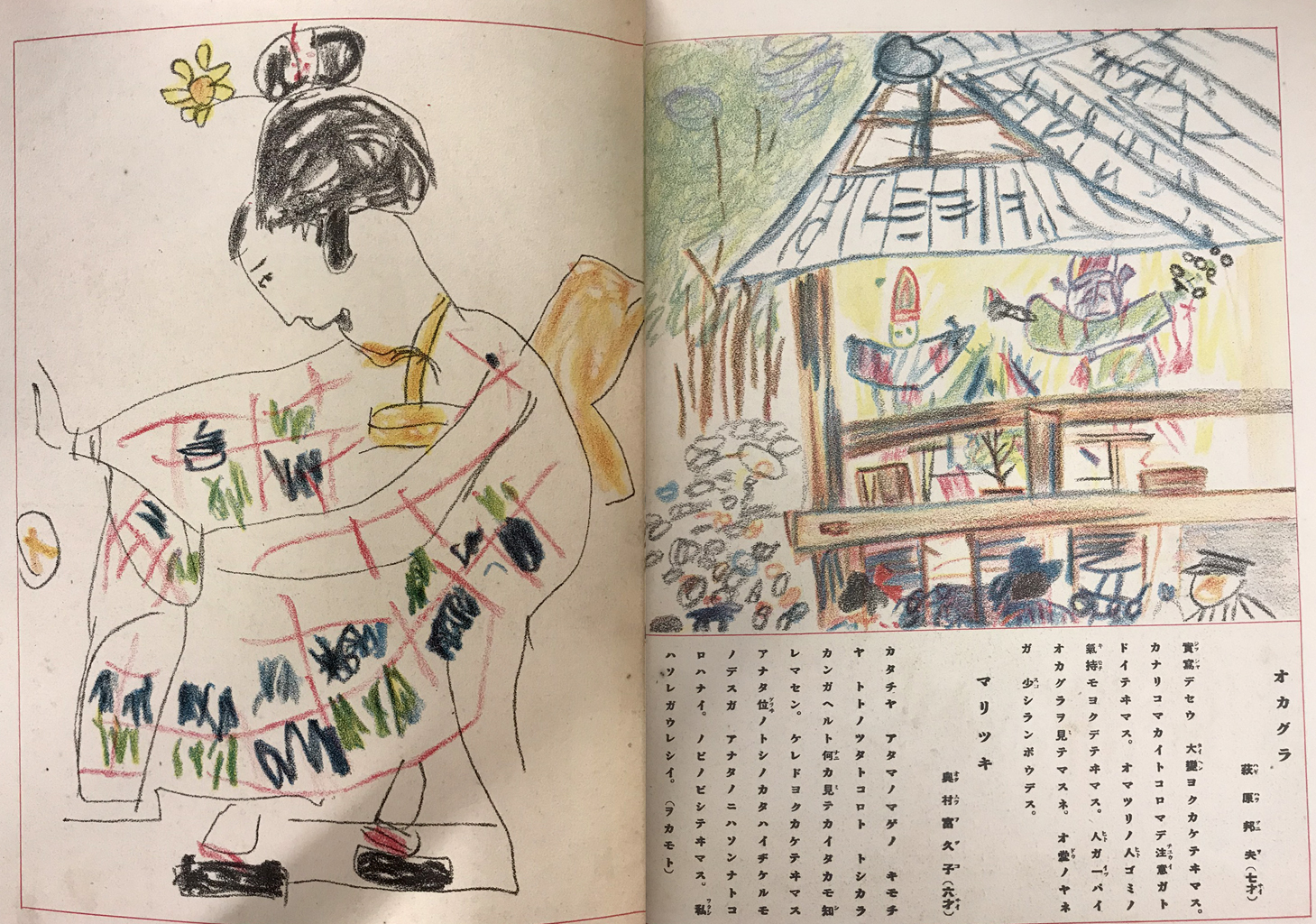
A girl with a mari drawn by a six-year-old (left); Okaburaya Shrine dance, drawn by a seven-year-old (right), vol. 2 no. 9, September 1922.

The main goal of Kodomo no kuni was to share art of all kinds with children of all ages in Japan. The creators had a strong understanding of the importance of early engagement in the arts and strived to encourage children to experiment and explore creatively. Each issue featured contributions from both amateur and professional painters, composers, illustrators, writers, lyricists, and other artists.

The creators of the magazine selected a theme on which all contributions were loosely based each month. Paintings, illustrations, choreographed dance steps, stories, crafts, songs, plays, and more were combined side by side in every issue. The contributors often worked not only with one another but also with the magazine's young readers who were regularly encouraged to send in their own submissions for publication.

From January 1922 until March 1944, Kodomo no kuni produced 23 volumes that were separated into 287 smaller, typically 32-page issues. The illustration assignments for each issue included the front and back cover in addition to several dozen single and double-page illustration spots. Select special issues included a pair of fold-out pages that doubled the amount of illustration space available for a single picture from two pages to four. Most text is written in katakana, which also serves as furigana.

== History ==
Kodomo no kuni was published monthly in Japan for over twenty years, beginning in the Taishō era in 1922 and continuing until the early Shōwa era in 1944. Other publications for children had begun about a decade earlier in Japan, but Kodomo no kuni was the first of its kind to specifically support the education of children with the arts.

Kodomo no kuni closely followed Kodomo no tomo (1914) and Akai tori (1918) in creating some of the first Japanese artwork for children from the perspective of children. To read Kodomo no kuni nearly a century after its original publication is to witness a pictorial history of Western and Japanese children's fashion, toys, and technology. Each issue featured illustrations of children wearing brightly colored rain boots, patterned dresses, and fur-collared winter coats, in settings like the department store, the playground, school, and more, all reflective of daily life and children's stories of the time.

The publication also included many illustrations of children exploring new technologies like zeppelins, telephones, radios, and steel bridges. At the time, contributing artist Koyata Yasui was known for dynamic, intricately detailed illustrations of machines and technology. His drawings of spiraling railways were so realistic that you could nearly count the number of screws used in their construction. Such attention to detail and accuracy had rarely been represented in art intended for young children in Japan before Kodomo no kuni.

=== 1922–1932 ===
Tokyosha founded the magazine in 1922, hiring Koko Wada as editor-in-chief and Kiichi Okamoto as illustration editor. Sōzo Kurahashi, a respected educator and child psychologist, was hired to serve as the magazine's chief consultant. Sōzo specifically instructed artists to portray children as happy and carefree in their homes, schools, and broader communities. Every publication at this time also included educational information, games, and puzzles for mothers printed in black-and-white on cheaper paper and attached to the back cover.

The magazine served as the home for many far-Left activists like Tomoyoshi Murayama who were otherwise unable to find work due to previous reprimands or arrests for speaking about their views. Kodomo no kuni did not turn them away, instead embracing their unique artistic styles and providing them with a place to share their art.

=== 1932–1944 ===
The magazine's main art director, Kiichi Okamoto, died in 1931, leaving fellow artist Takeo Takei to take his position at the publication. There was a noticeable shift in the magazine's tone due to both Okamoto's absence and the start of World War II just a few years later. During the mid-to-late 1930s, depictions of war in advertisements, art, music, and stories became more common. The June 1939 issue, vol. 18 no. 6, included a photograph of the Emperor.

== Art ==
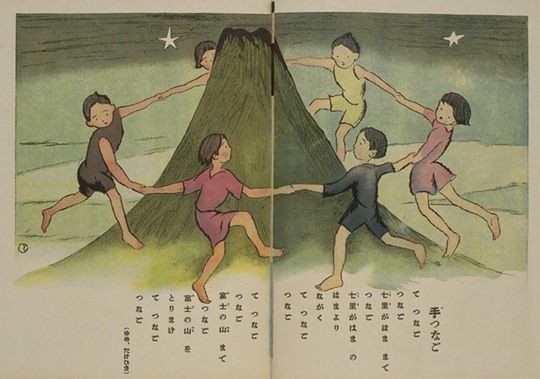
Holding Hands, Yumeji Takehisa, vol. 1 no. 12, December 1922.

Kodomo no kuni published the work of more than one hundred artists between 1922 and 1932, a quarter of whom were women. By 1944, the magazine had published more than nine thousand original illustrations.

The editors of Kodomo no kuni stressed to contributing artists that the magazine was looking for a wide variety of genuine forms of artistic expression. Artists were not constrained by a select medium or style. Instead, contributors were instructed to simply view children, imagine what they were thinking, and figure out a way to create a picture that young readers could see themselves in. Though the magazine included illustrations of children from all backgrounds, there was a special emphasis on representing the children who most often purchased the magazine: those who lived in Japanese cities and urban centers.

The art included in Kodomo no kuni represented many of the new ideas and artistic styles that had flourished in Japan during the Taishō era. The influences of expressionism, Art Deco, constructivism, fauvism, late impressionism, and cubism are all clearly evident in the art of the magazine. In just one issue, Kodomo no kuni's artwork could range from bright to dark, watercolor to woodcut, hopeful to disturbing, and magical to realistic. Artists and designers were encouraged to be constantly experimenting and evolving, which resulted in a publication that blended all kinds of Western and Japanese influences together in one place.

=== Nihon Dōga Kyokai (Japan Association of Illustration for Children) ===
Takeo Takei was the cover artist for the first issue of Kodomo no kuni and became a regular contributor soon after, eventually becoming one of the magazine's most published artists. His submissions included letterpress prints, lithographs, and woodcuts, in addition to numerous mixed media experiments. Takeo's illustrations were immersed in the newly introduced Japanese ideas of dōwa (stories for children) and dōyō (songs for children). After creating children's illustrations for Kodomo no kuni for several years, he coined the term dōga to mean "pictures for children."

In 1927, Takeo Takei organized a group of illustrators at Kodomo no kuni and co-founded Nihon Dōga Kyokai or the Japan Association of Illustration for Children. Core members of the group included Takei, Shiro Kawakami, Yoshio Shimizu, Kiichi Okamoto, Shōzō Fukazawa, Tomoyoshi Murayama, and Shigeru Hatsuyama, whose distinctive geometric style brought popularized abstraction at the publication. The group was the first of its kind in Japan, specifically organized to further the artistic quality of children's art and illustrations. Nihon dōga kyokai was dissolved in 1941 as a result of wartime policies.

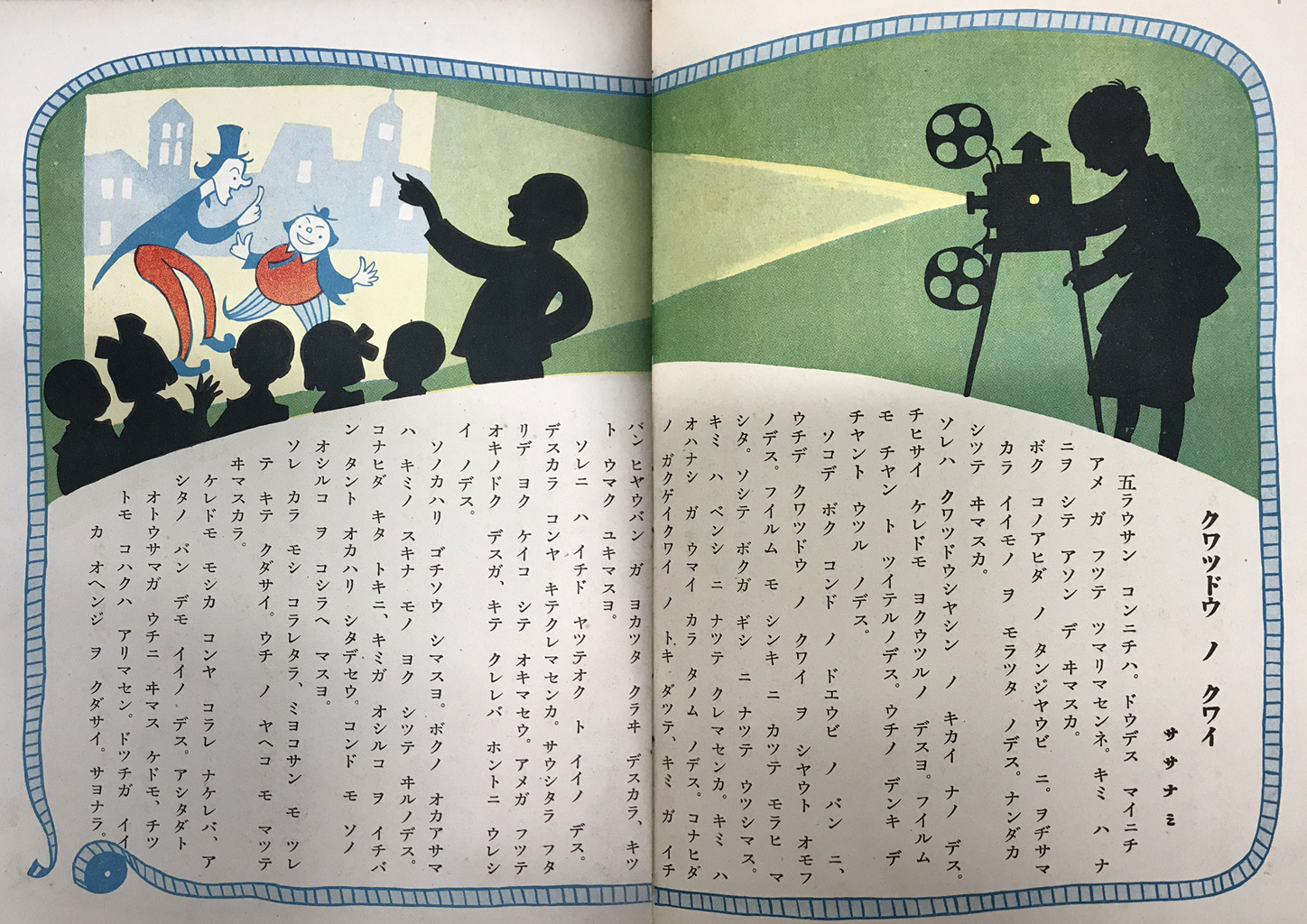
Moving Picture Show, Sazanami Iwaya, vol. 2 no. 6, June 1922.

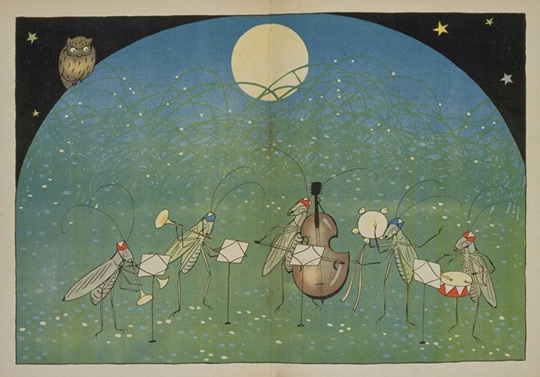
The Insects' Orchestra, Shōtarō Honda, vol. 1 no. 9, September 1922.

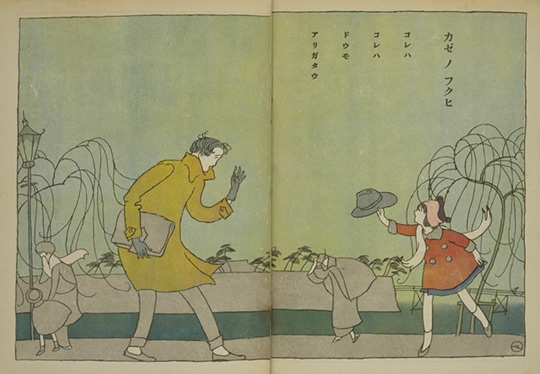
A Windy Day, Shōtarō Honda, vol. 2 no. 1, January 1923.

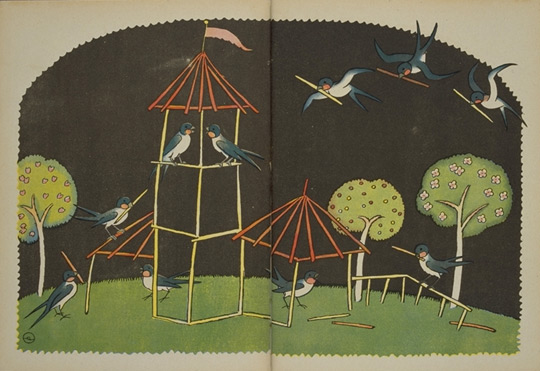
The Swallow's Architecture, Shōtarō Honda, vol. 2 no. 5, May 1923.

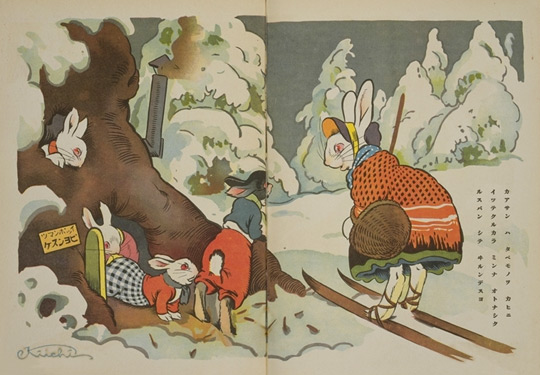
The Rabbit's Home, Kiichi Okamoto, vol. 4 no. 2, February 1925.

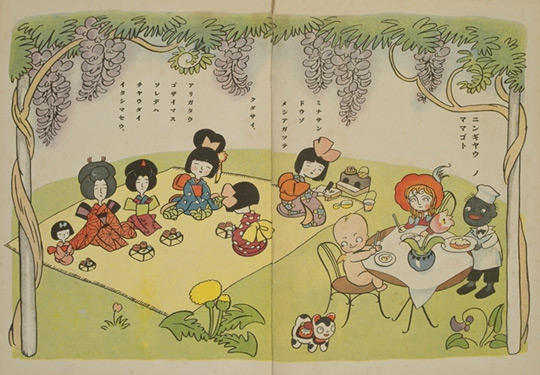
The Dolls Playing House, Shōtarō Honda, vol. 4 no. 5, May 1925.

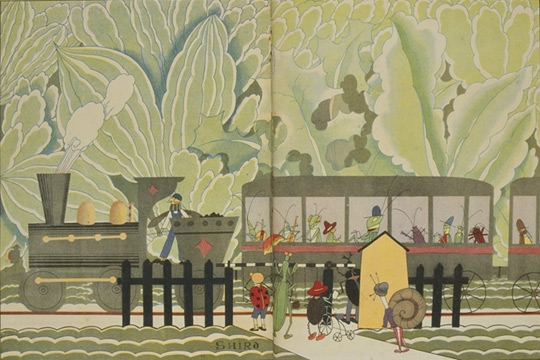
The Insects' Journey, Shiro Kawakami, vol. 5 no. 10, October 1926.

== Notable contributors ==
=== Artists ===
- Shōzō Fukazawa
- Shigeru Hatsuyama
- Kaii Higashiyama
- Shōtarō Honda
- Tomoe Iwaoka
- Shiro Kawakami
- Haruyo Kawashima
- Harue Koga
- Fumio Matsuyama
- Tomoyoshi Murayama
- Jun'ichi Nakahara
- Ippei Okamoto
- Kiichi Okamoto
- Kōshirō Onchi
- Yoshio Shimizu
- Yumeji Takehisa
- Takeo Takei
- Koyata Yasui

=== Composers/lyricists ===
- Shinpei Nakayama (musical composition advisor)
- Yoshimi Satō

=== Editors ===
- Sōzo Kurahashi (editor-in-chief)
- Kiichi Okamoto (chief art editor)
- Wada Masao

=== Poets ===
- Hakushu Kitahara (children's song advisor)
- Michio Mado
- Ujō Noguchi (children's song advisor)

=== Writers ===
- Kosuke Hamada
- Sazanami Iwaya
- Fukuo Kishibe
- Tomoyoshi Murayama
- Mimei Ogawa

== Cover gallery ==
Takeo Takei, vol. 1 no. 1, January 1922.

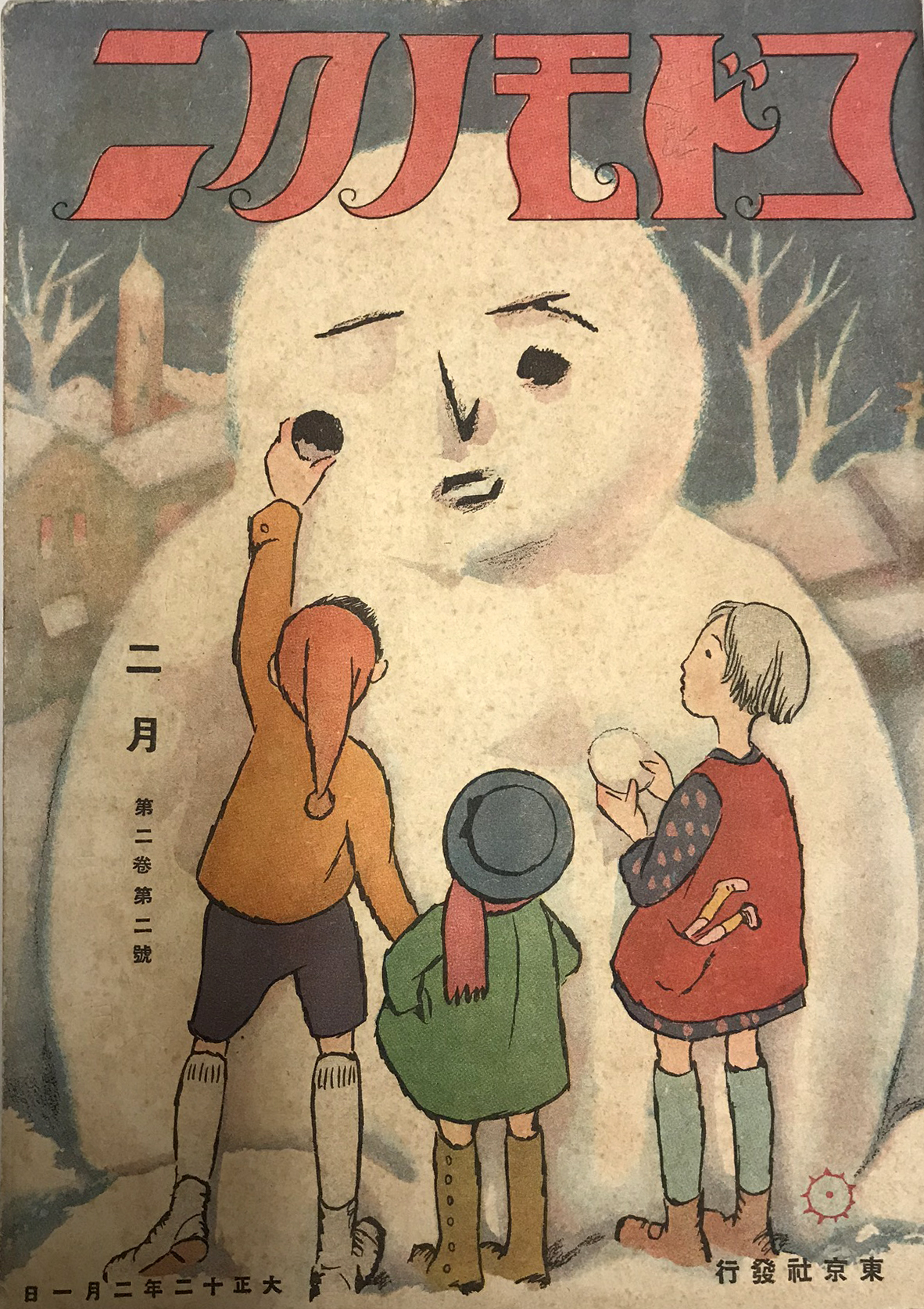
Yumeji Takehisa, vol. 2 no. 2, February 1923.

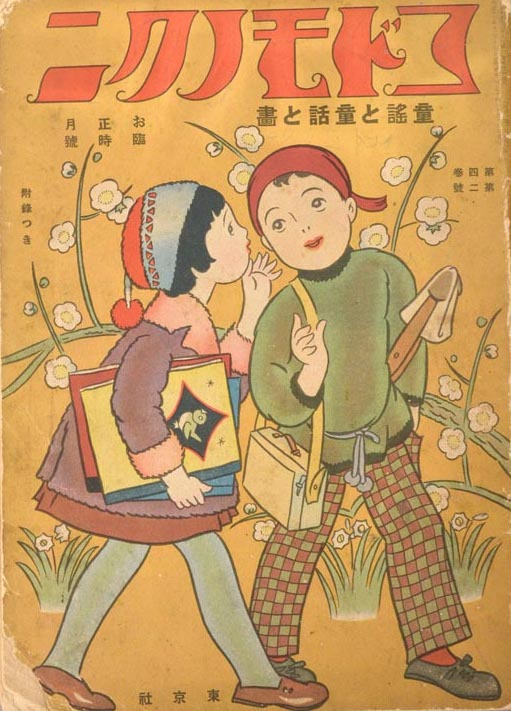
Vol. 4 no. 1, January 1925.

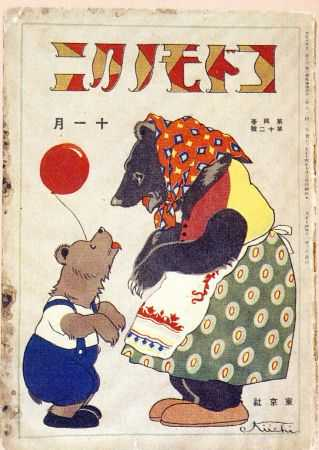
Kiichi Okamoto, vol. 4 no. 11, November 1925.

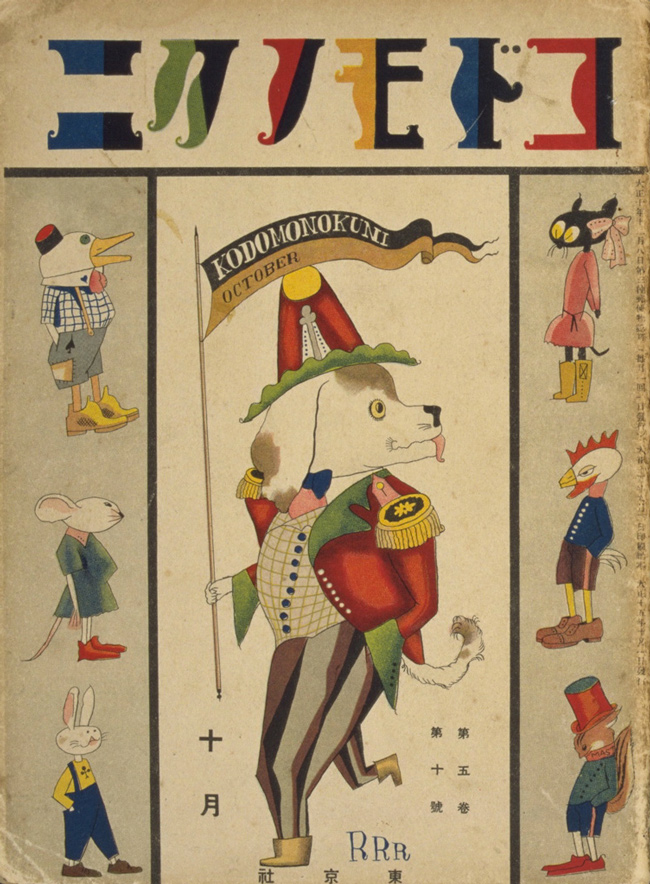
Takeo Takei, vol. 5 no. 10, October 1926.

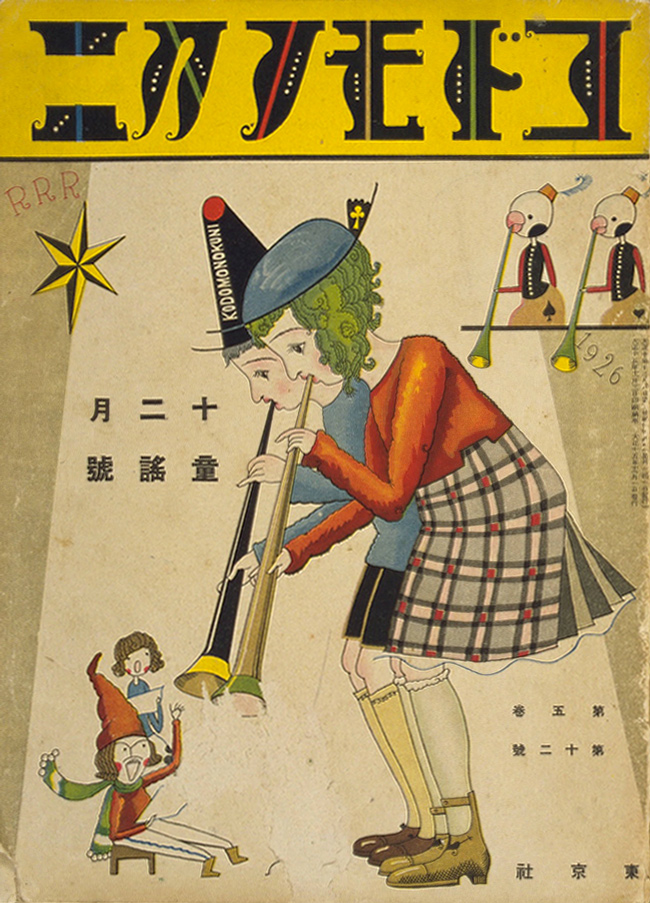
Takeo Takei, vol. 5 no. 12, December 1926.

== Collections ==
The Cotsen Children's Library at Princeton University contains a large collection of the magazine. The library holds at least one copy of 225 of the 287 total issues of Kodomo no kuni. Sometime before 2019, the International Library of Children's Literature in Tokyo, Japan digitized the entire library of Kodomo no kuni and organized them in a virtual exhibition that was available to anyone. The website has since been taken offline, but an archived version can be accessed here.

Original copies of Kodomo no kuni can be found in the collections of the following institutions:

- Chihiro Art Museum, Azumino, Japan.
- Cotsen Children's Library, Princeton University, New Jersey, United States.
- Furukawa Museum of Literature, Kōka, Shika, Japan.
- International Library of Children's Literature, Taitō, Tokyo, Japan.
- International Institute for Children's Literature, Osaka, Japan.
- Kanagawa Museum of Modern Literature, Yokohama, Japan.
- Museo Nacional d'Art de Catalunya, Barcelona, Spain.
- Musashino Art University Museum and Library, Kodaira, Tokyo, Japan.
- Yokosuka Museum of Art, Kanagawa, Tokyo, Japan.
