= Tomoe Iwaoka =

Japanese painter and illustrator

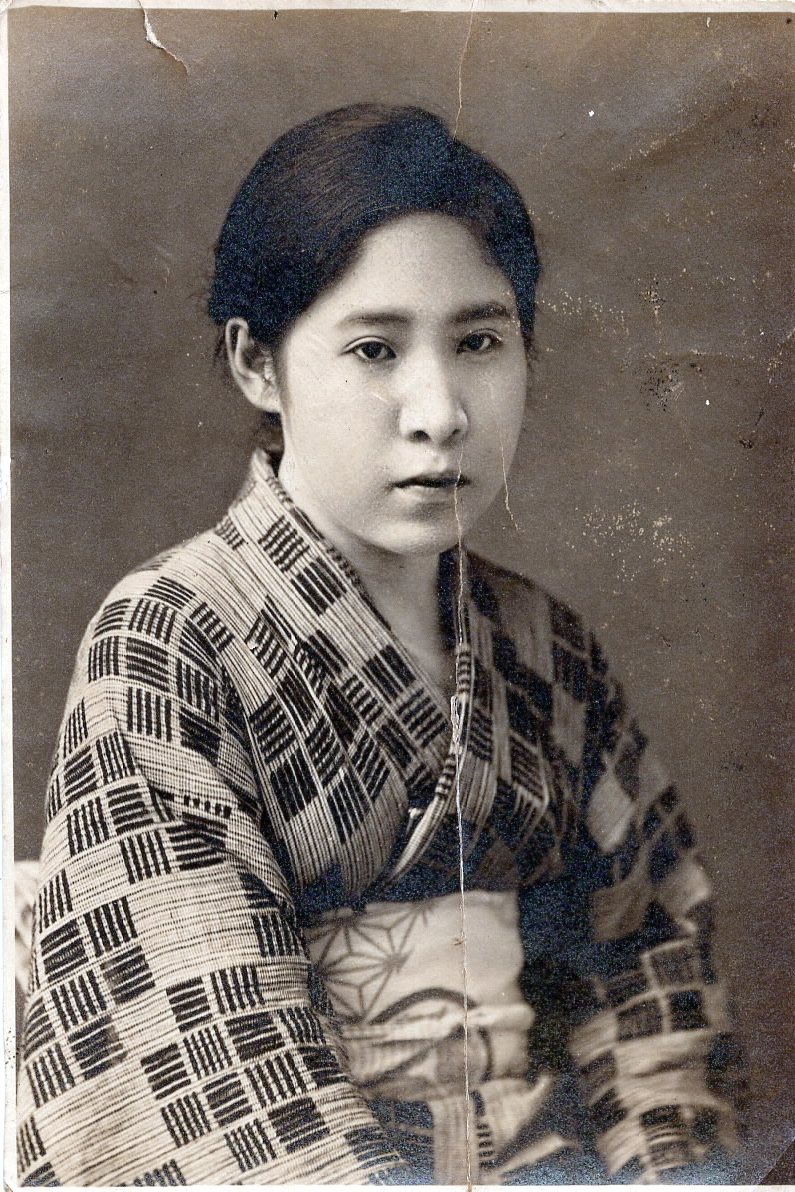
- Born: June 15, 1896; Tokyo, Japan
- Died: November 7, 1933 (aged 37); Saiseikai Central Hospital, Tokyo, Japan
- Style: Nihonga

Tomoe Iwaoka (とも枝単独, Iwaoka Tomoe; June 15, 1896 – November 7, 1933) was a Japanese-style painter and illustrator, best known for her contributions to art for children. She was active from the end of the Taishō era until the beginning of the Shōwa era.

Tomoe Iwaoka was born on June 15, 1896, in Tokyo, Japan. Her father was a prominent lawyer named Iyoji Iwaoka. In 1912 when Tomoe was 16, her father was elected to the 11th House of Representatives in Japan. Tomoe Iwaoka died on November 7, 1933, in Tokyo at the age of 37.

== Career ==
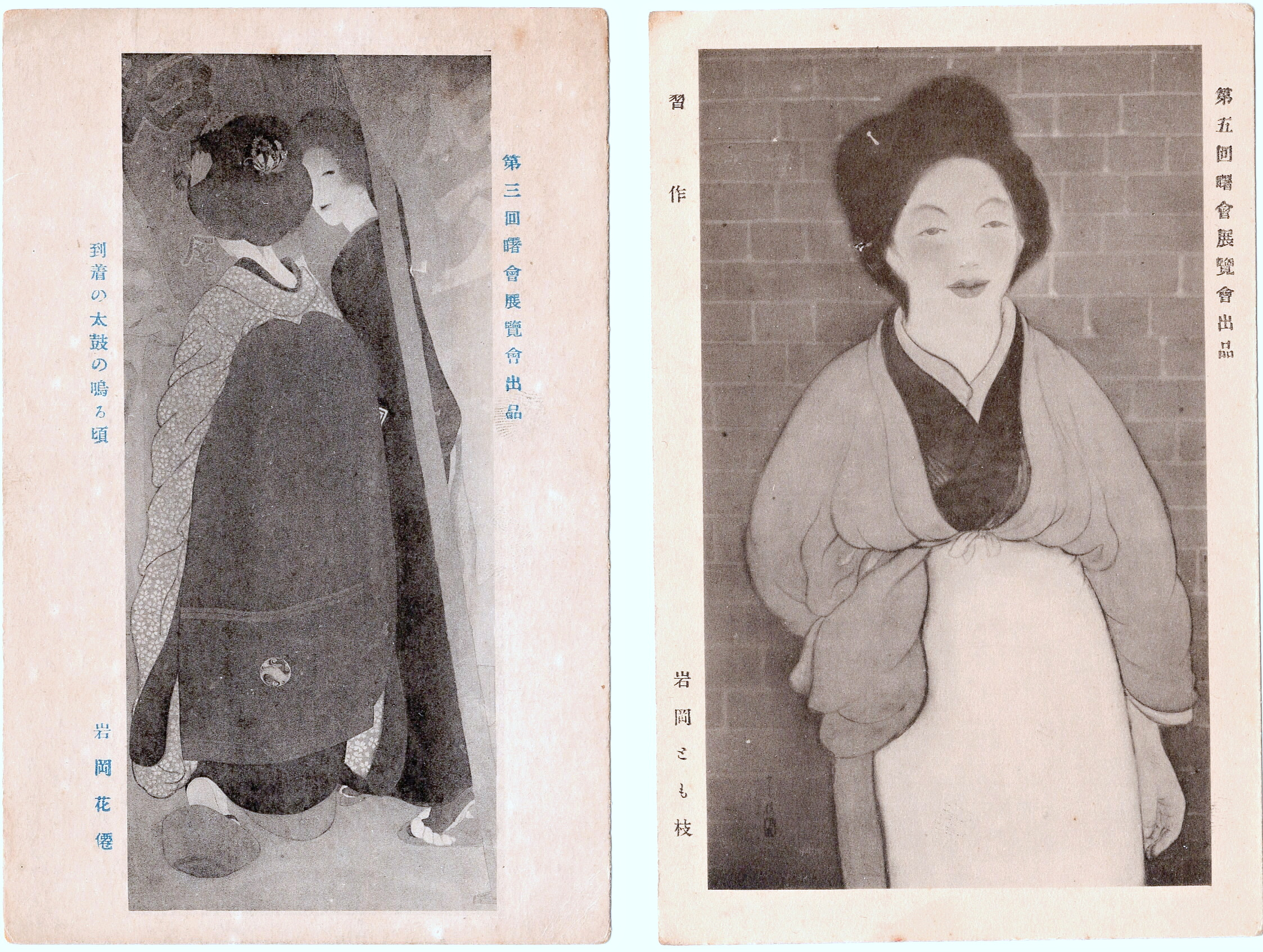
Postcards illustrated by Tomoe to promote an art exhibition, c. 1920s.

=== Kodomo no Kuni ===
Tomoe regularly contributed to the popular children's magazine Kodomo no Kuni (children's magazine) that was published monthly in Japan from 1922 to 1944. The magazine was the first in Japan to hire multiple, rotating illustrators rather than hiring a select number of in-house artists. Other employees of the publication included Kiichi Okamoto, Shinpei Nakayama, Hakushu Kitahara, and Yumeji Takehisa. By 1932, the magazine had published the contributions of more than one hundred artists, approximately twenty-five of whom were women.

The following is a small selection of Kodomo no Kuni issues known to feature illustrations by Tomoe Iwaoka:

- March 1925, v. 4, #4.
- September 1926, v. 5, #9.
- December 1929, v. 8, #15.
- March 1931, v. 10, #3.
- March 1932, v. 11, #3.

=== Book illustration ===
- Washinton, Shin'ei Mitsui, 1926.
- Saru to kani (The Monkey and The Crab), Masao Kusuyama, 1925.
- Jan barujan (Jean Valjean), Victor Hugo, Gen'ichi Kume, 1926.
- Minashigo (Oliver Twist), Charles Dickens, Shin'ei Mitsui, 1926.
- Koko musuko, Iwasaburo Okino, 1927.
- Nihon bungei dowashu, Kan Kikuchi, 1927.
- Arabiyan naito (One Thousand and One Nights), Jinjiyo, 1928.
- Hakuchohime monogatari, Miwa Tateishi, 1928.
- Maho kurabe, Miwa Tateishi, 1928.
- Maho no karasu, Jiro Yamamoto, 1928.
- Nihon dowashu jokan (Japanese Folktales, v. 1), Kan Kikuchi, 1928.
- Oyakōkōna shōnen shōjo no hanashi, Ōto Kiichirō, 1929.
- Furandāsu no shōnen (A Dog of Flanders), Ouida, 1929.

== Collections ==
Numerous children's books illustrated by Tomoe Iwaoka are now housed in the National Diet Library in Tokyo.

- Nihon dowashu jokan, book illustrations, 1928, Cotsen Children's Library at Princeton University, New Jersey.
- Saru to kani, book illustrations, 1925, Cotsen Children's Library at Princeton University, New Jersey.
- Furandasu no shonen, book illustrations, Leiden University Library in Leiden, Netherlands.
