= A Page of Madness =

1926 film

- Promotional release poster
- Directed by: Teinosuke Kinugasa
- Written by: Yasunari Kawabata; Teinosuke Kinugasa; Minoru Inuzuka; Banko Sawada
- Produced by: Teinosuke Kinugasa
- Starring: Masao Inoue; Yoshie Nakagawa; Ayako Iijima
- Cinematography: Kōhei Sugiyama; Eiji Tsuburaya
- Music by: Minoru Muraoka ("New Sound" version)
- Production companies: Kinugasa Motion Picture League; National Film Art Company
- Release dates: July 10, 1926 (Japan); April 27, 1975 ("New Sound" version)
- Running time: 71 minutes
- Country: Japan

A Page of Madness (1926) by Teinosuke Kinugasa

A Page of Madness (狂った一頁, Kurutta Ichipēji) is a 1926 Japanese silent experimental horror film directed by Teinosuke Kinugasa. Lost for 45 years until it was rediscovered by Kinugasa in his storehouse in 1971, the film is the product of an avant-garde group of artists in Japan known as the Shinkankakuha (or School of New Perceptions) who tried to overcome naturalistic representation. The film is set in a mental institution in contemporary Japan.

Yasunari Kawabata, who won the Nobel Prize for Literature in 1968, was credited on the film with the original story. He is often cited as the screenwriter, and a version of the scenario is printed in his complete works, but the scenario is now considered a collaboration between him, Kinugasa, Banko Sawada, and Minoru Inuzuka. Eiji Tsuburaya is credited as an assistant cameraman.

== Plot ==
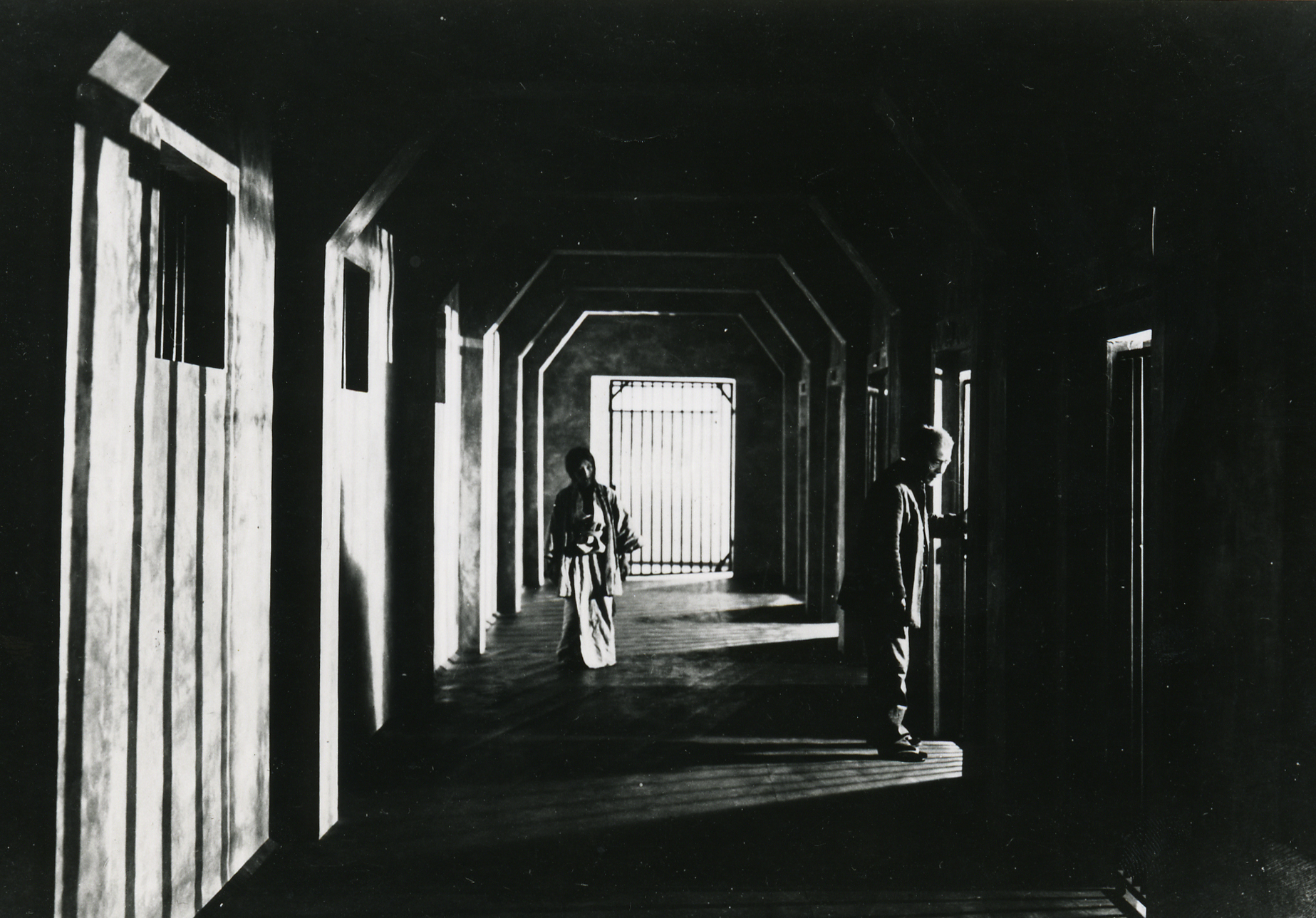
A corridor in the asylum (film still)

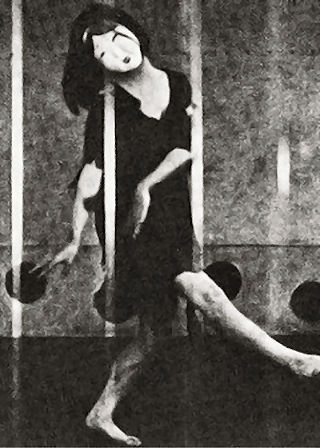
Eiko Minami in A Page of Madness

Amid a torrential rainstorm late one night, a patient at a psychiatric hospital dances wildly as if she is possessed. The elderly custodian stares at the mentally ill woman being held inside a cell. She is revealed to be his wife, but the woman does not recognize her husband due to her condition. Formerly a sailor, the man frequently left his wife and daughter alone to go on long voyages at sea, causing his wife to become mentally unstable. She became a patient at the hospital after an attempt to kill herself and their child. The old man feels remorseful and works at the hospital to watch over his wife, unknown to everyone else at the clinic.

The next morning, the couple's daughter visits the hospital to report her upcoming marriage but is shocked and angry when she learns that her father works at the hospital. The daughter heads to her mother's hospital room, but is disappointed in her unresponsive mother and leaves the hospital, unable to forgive her father for driving her mother crazy. A morning examination is held at the hospital, and the janitor asks the doctor who is examining his wife about her condition, but he does not respond. The janitor later reunites with his daughter, asking her for forgiveness, and asks about her engagement. The wife, who was allowed to take a morning walk, quietly looked at the sky as she walked on the lawn, and the janitor and his daughter watch from a distance. The brief moment of peace is interrupted when an inmate attempts to attack the daughter, causing her to flee from the hospital.

Months later, one of the patients begins dancing, exciting the others, who begin to cheer her on. In the ensuing commotion, one of the patients accidentally hits the janitor's wife and a fight breaks out. The hospital staff soon manage to stop the brawl. These events cause the janitor to experience a number of delusions, as he slowly loses the ability to determine fantasy from reality. He first has a daydream about winning a chest of drawers in a lottery that he could give to his daughter as part of her dowry. When his daughter comes to tell him that her marriage is in trouble, he thinks about taking his wife away from the asylum. He also fantasizes about killing the head doctor, but the vision gets out of hand as a bearded inmate is seen marrying his daughter.

The janitor finally fantasizes about distributing noh masks to the inmates, providing them with happy faces while he dons an okina (old man) mask. Later the janitor is shown once again mopping the floors of the asylum, no longer able to visit his wife's ward because he lost the keys (picked up by the doctor). He sees the bearded inmate pass by, who bows to him for the first time, perhaps as if bowing to his father-in-law, or perhaps to confirm that everything he now believes to have been fantasy, might have actually occurred.

== Cast ==
Actor	Role
Masao Inoue	the custodian
Ayako Iijima	the custodian's daughter
Yoshie Nakagawa	the custodian's wife
Hiroshi Nemoto	the fiancé
Misao Seki	the chief doctor
Minoru Takase	patient A
Eiko Minami	the dancer
Kyosuke Takamatsu	patient B, the bearded inmate
Tetsu Tsuboi	patient C
Shintarō Takiguchi	the gateman's son

== Production ==
The film is the creation of a group of Japanese avant-garde artists, known as Shinkankakuha (lit. "School of new perceptions" (or sensations)) and is considered the first film of a stillborn "neo-sensationist" current, but shows influences of German expressionist cinema. It abounds with flashbacks, quick cuts, fast camera movements, optical inventions and symbolism. It is one of the early films directed by Kinugasa as well as one of Eiji Tsuburaya's early film works, the latter credited as assistant cinematographer.

== Release ==
=== Initial release ===
A Page of Madness was first screened in Tokyo on 10 July 1926. Screenings would have included live narration by a storyteller or benshi as well as musical accompaniment. The famous benshi Musei Tokugawa narrated the film at the Musashinokan theater in Shinjuku in Tokyo. It grossed over a thousand dollars a week, which was impressive at the time considering the price of movie admission was only five cents.

The profits came as a relief to the director, who almost had become bankrupt forming his Kinugasa Motion Picture League, to the point where the film's actors had slept on set or in the office for lack of accommodations and had to help paint sets, make props, and push the camera dolly.

Film scholar Aaron Gerow notes that in a culture that looked down on domestic movie production, A Page of Madness was considered one of the few Japanese films equal to foreign ones; even with that, however, it didn't have much influence on other filmmakers. Unlike some other silent films of the era, A Page of Madness does not feature intertitles. This, coupled with the fact that the surviving print is missing nearly a third of the 1926 version, can make the film difficult to follow for modern viewers.

=== 20th-century screenings and release ===
The film was thought lost for 45 years, until it was rediscovered by Kinugasa in a rice barrel kept in his storage cabin in 1971. The rediscovered version lacks a third of the original content.

A music score for the film was composed by Muraoka Minoru in 1971, commissioned by Kinugasa himself.

Two years later, the film was presented at the Rotterdam International Film Festival and the Berlin International Film Festival.

Aonno Jiken Ensemble created a score and debuted it at a midnight screening for the film at the 1998 Seattle Asian American Film Festival. A recording of the accompaniment was released on CD later that year. A documentary featuring the group's rehearsals of the score was created in 2005 and screened at that year's annual Cityvisions festival in New York.

=== 21st-century screenings ===
The film was shown at the 2004 Melbourne International Film Festival and the 2018 Milwaukee International Film Festival. Turner Classic Movies aired the George Eastman House Archives print of the film in 2016, using a score by the Alloy Orchestra. Film Preservation Associates and its partner Flicker Alley released a DVD/BR in 2017 with the same score. The Japanese Avant-Garde and Experimental Film Festival hosted a screening on 24 September 2017 at King's College, London, with a live musical score and an English narration by benshi Tomoko Komura.

CAMERA JAPAN, a yearly Japanese cultural festival based in the Netherlands, featured a screening of the film with live musical accompaniment as part of its 2017 lineup. The same year, the film, with a live accompaniment by the Alloy Orchestra, was presented at the San Francisco Silent Film Festival. The Alloy Orchestra also provided the score for a screening at the Lincoln Center in New York City, and for the aforementioned DVD release of the film.

The film was screened at the 2018 Ebertfest, on 20 April. Four days later, it was screened at the Eastman Museum in Rochester, New York, accompanied by a live piano accompaniment. Benshi Nanako Yamauchi narrated screenings, accompanied by local music group Little Bang Theory, at the Kenilworth 508 Theatre in Milwaukee 8 and 9 October 2022; at the Michigan Theater on 13 October 2022; and at the Detroit Film Theatre on 16 October 2022. Techno band Coupler was commissioned by the National Museum of Asian Art in Washington, DC to create and perform a new score to accompany the film's screening on 5 May 2023.

The film was screened alongside a fragment of Kinugasa's partially lost 1927 film Oni Azami at the 37th edition of Il Cinema Ritrovato in Bologna, Italy as part of a tribute section celebrating the director's work.

The film was screened at Film Fest Gent 2023 and Roadburn Festival 2024 accompanied by a live soundtrack by the band Wiegedood.

The film was also screened at the Babylon movie theater in Berlin in the early hours of Sunday, September 6th 2026, accompanied by a duo of theater organ and flute.

== Reception ==
=== Modern assessments ===
Reception of A Page of Madness since its rediscovery has been mostly positive. Dennis Schwartz from Ozus' World Movie Reviews awarded the film a grade A, calling it "a vibrant and unsettling work of great emotional power". Time Out, praised the film, writing "A Page of Madness remains one of the most radical and challenging Japanese movies ever seen here." Panos Kotzathanasis from Asian Movie Pulse.com called it "a masterpiece", praising the film's acting, music, and imagery. Jonathan Crow from Allmovie praised its "eerie, painted sets", lighting, and editing, calling it "a striking exploration of the nature of madness". Nottingham Culture's BBC preview of the film called it, "a balletic musing on our subconscious nightmares, examining dream states in a way that is both beautiful and highly disturbing." Jonathan Rosenbaum of The Chicago Reader praised the film's expressionist style, imagery, and depictions of madness as being "both startling and mesmerizing".

It was included at number 50 in Slant Magazine's "100 Best Horror Movies of All Time", citing the film's visuals and atmosphere as "lingering long after the film ends". The British Film Institute listed A Page of Madness as the best Japanese film of 1926, praising its "stunning visuals comprising a magnificent mixture of different modes and influences".

== See also ==
- List of rediscovered films
