= Kiichi Okamoto =

Japanese painter (1888–1930)

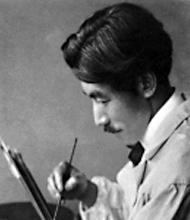
- Born: 12 June 1888; Hyōgo Prefecture, Japan
- Died: 29 December 1930 (aged 42); Tokyo Prefecture, Japan
- Education: Hakubakai
- Known for: Illustration for children
- Movement: Yōga

Kiichi Okamoto (Japanese: 岡本 歸一, romanized: Okamoto Kiichi; 12 June 1888 – 29 December 1930) was a Japanese painter best known for his illustrations for children.

== Early life ==
Okamoto was born in Sumoto on Awaji Island in 1888. He and his family moved to Tokyo in 1892 for his father's promotion to the vice-president of Miyako Shimbun. When in elementary school, Okamoto encountered hand fans with beautiful paintings which fascinated him and motivated him to study painting.

In 1906, he was apprenticed to Seiki Kuroda to study yōga at the age of 18. Among his fellow pupils was Ryūsei Kishida, with whom Okamoto formed an artists' group and named it Fusain Society (Fyūzankai) to promote Post-Impressionism. Enthralled by Vincent van Gogh and Paul Cézanne, they held an exhibition challenging the conservative Bunten in 1912. It angered Kuroda and brought an end to their mentoring relationship, leading to the split of Fusain Society. Nevertheless, Okamoto and Kishida organized a new group together with Shōhachi Kimura and Kōtarō Takamura to give an exhibition of their own paintings in October 1913.

Okamoto was also active in the sōsaku hanga movement. The influence of William Nicholson can be seen in his hanga Portrait of N.O. He was also influenced by Edmund Dulac and Arthur Rackham.

== Career in children's media ==
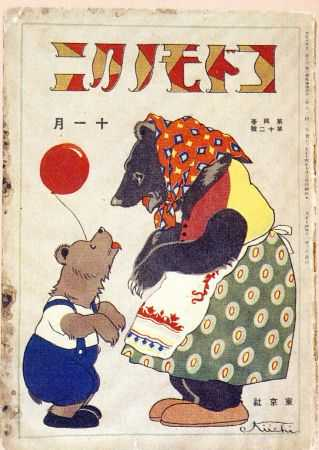
Kodomo no Kuni (November 1925)

In 1914, upon his marriage, Okamoto moved next door to Kusuyama Masao, a popular theater critic and translator of Western literature. Kusuyama helped Okamoto expand his activities to include stage design, and also asked Okamoto to draw illustrations for a series of juvenile novels Mohan Katei Bunko, of which he was the editor-in-chief, in 1915.

Okamoto began drawing for Kin no Fune, a magazine of children's literature and songs, in 1919. Knowing Ujō Noguchi through his jobs, Okamoto drew illustrations for Noguchi's works.

In 1922, Okamoto was named chief illustrator for Kodomo no Kuni from its second issue. Kodomo no Kuni was sold at a half yen per copy, relatively expensive compared to rival magazines, but was enough competitive due to its high quality of the pictures. Among the ardent readers were Chihiro Iwasaki and Seiichi Horiuchi, who would become leading illustrators for children in the mid-Shōwa period. Horiuchi admired Okamoto's ability to capture facial expressions.

Kodomo no Kuni was completely different from any other book I had ever read. A picture of beautiful evening primroses looked as if they were whiffling with scent in the dusk ... I fell in love with Okamoto's pictures ...

— Chihiro Iwasaki, 1968

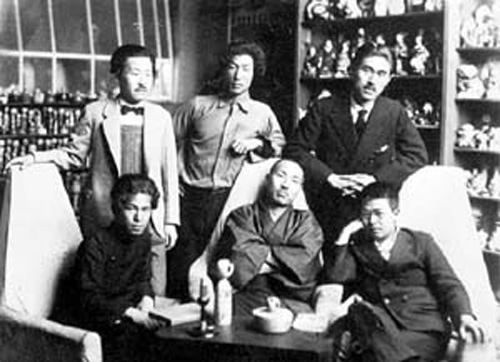
Founders of the Japan Association of Illustrators for Children

Starting to work for Shōjo Club in 1923 and for Kodomo Asahi in 1924, Okamoto became the most popular illustrator for children in Japan in the 1920s. In 1927, he participated in forming the Japan Association of Illustrators for Children with Takeo Takei, Tomoyoshi Murayama and other painters.

He had been busy with his work until just a few days before he died of typhoid fever at the age of 42 in Tokyo.

== Family ==
Okamoto married Kishiko in 1914 and had two sons. His elder son, Hajime, became a professional yacht photographer.

== Gallery ==
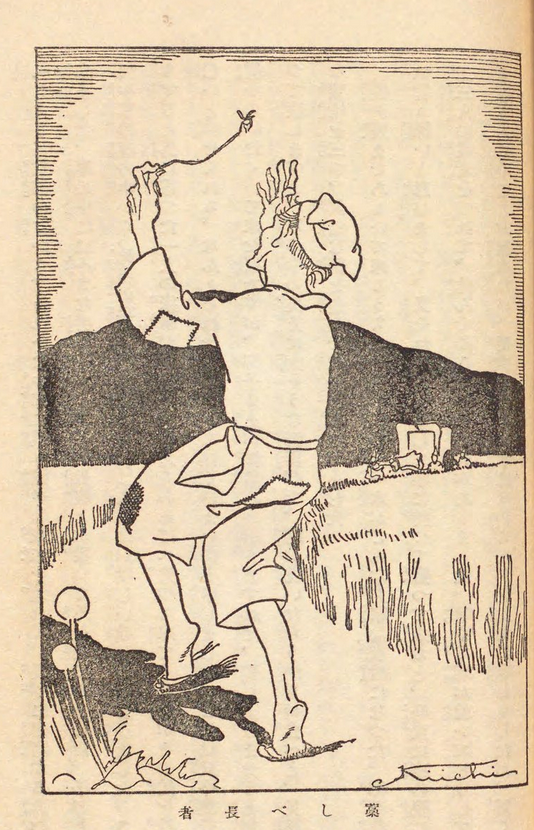
Straw Millionaire (1916) in Kunio Yanagita's book of folktales.

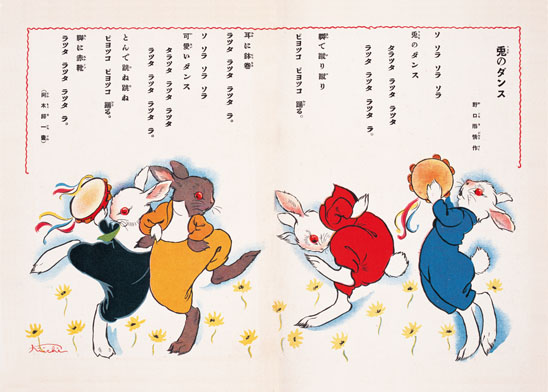
Rabbits' Dance (1924) with Ujō Noguchi's lyrics.

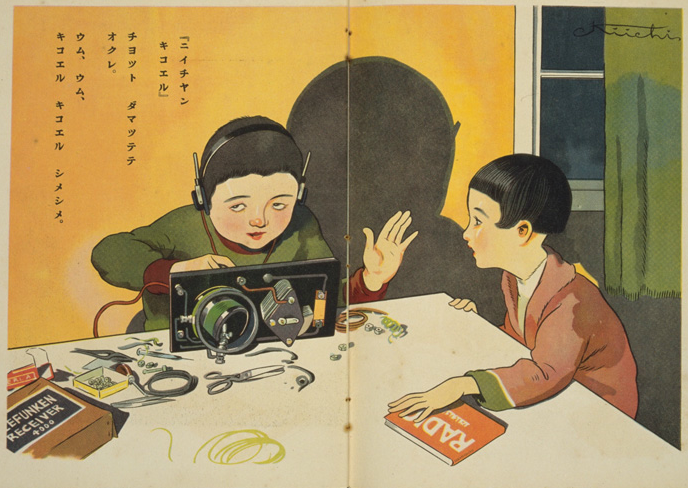
Building a Radio (1928). Okamoto introduced then-newest technology in some of his pictures.

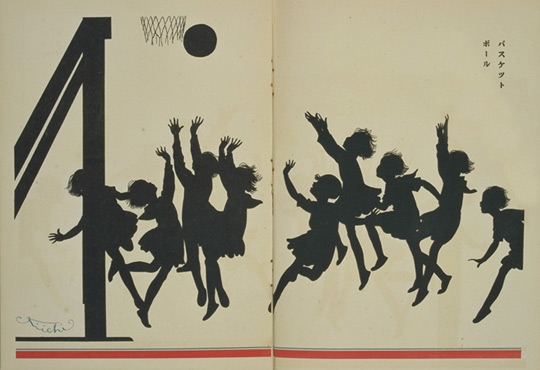
Basketball (1928). He learned silhouette cuts from Arthur Rackham's works.

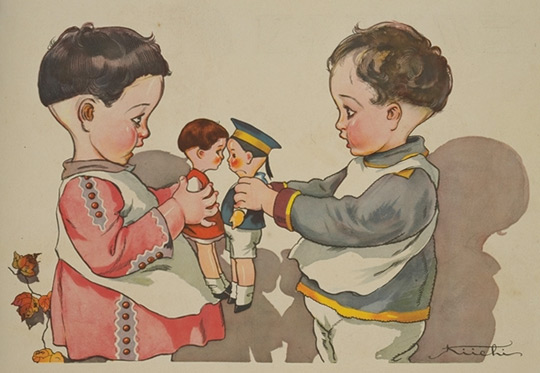
Best Friends (1931), one of his posthumous works.
