= 蹴鞠 =

蹴鞠 may refer to:

- Cuju, an ancient code of football with similarities to association football, which originated in China
- Kemari, a form of football that was popular in Japan during the Heian Period
