= Tomoyoshi =

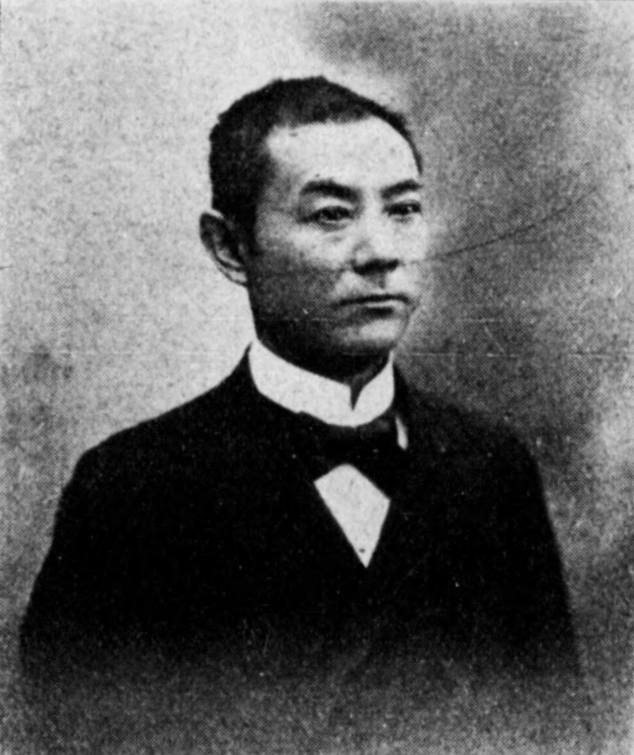
- Tomoyoshi Soeda (1854-1912), Meiji period politician, civil rights activist
- Pronunciation: tomojoɕi (IPA)
- Gender: Male

Origin
- Origin: Japanese
- Meaning: Different meanings depending on the kanji used

Other names
- Alternative spelling: Tomoyosi (Kunrei-shiki) Tomoyosi (Nihon-shiki) Tomoyoshi (Hepburn)

Tomoyoshi is a masculine Japanese given name.

== Written forms ==
Tomoyoshi can be written using many different combinations of kanji characters. Some examples:

- 友義, "friend, justice"
- 友吉, "friend, good luck"
- 友善, "friend, virtuous"
- 友芳, "friend, virtuous/fragrant"
- 友良, "friend, good"
- 友慶, "friend, congratulate"
- 友嘉, "friend, excellent"
- 友好, "friend, good/like something"
- 友能, "friend, capacity"
- 友佳, "friend, excellent"
- 知義, "know, justice"
- 知吉, "know, good luck"
- 知善, "know, virtuous"
- 知芳, "know, virtuous/fragrant"
- 知良, "know, good"
- 智義, "intellect, justice"
- 智吉, "intellect, good luck"
- 智善, "intellect, virtuous"
- 共吉, "together, good luck"
- 朋能, "companion, capacity"
- 朝義, "morning/dynasty, justice"
- 朝吉, "morning/dynasty, good luck"
- 朝良, "morning/dynasty, good"

The name can also be written in hiragana ともよし or katakana トモヨシ.

== Notable people with the name ==
- Tomoyoshi Fukushima (福島 丈貴; born 1993), Japanese water polo player
- Tomoyoshi Ikeya (池谷 友良; born 1962), Japanese footballer and manager
- Tomoyoshi Koyama (小山 知良; born 1983), Japanese motorcycle racer
- Tomoyoshi Murayama (村山 知義; 1901–1977), Japanese artist and playwright
- Tomoyoshi Ono (小野 智吉; born 1979), Japanese footballer
- Tomoyoshi Soeda (添田 知義; 1854-1912), Meiji period politician, civil rights activist
- Tomoyoshi Tsurumi (鶴見 智美; born 1979), Japanese footballer
- Tomoyoshi Watanabe (渡辺 具能; born 1941), Japanese politician
