= Byeonsa =

- Hangul: 변사
- Hanja: 辯士
- RR: byeonsa
- MR: pyŏnsa

Byeonsa (Korean: 변사) is a Korean word that referred to orators that worked in Korean cinema theaters in the silent film era. Byeonsa stood near the screen and narrated and commented on the events of the film. Some performers were particularly popular and audiences would visit theaters not only to see their favorite actors, but specific byeonsa.

== See also ==
- Benshi, its Japanese counterpart
