= The Oath of the Sword =

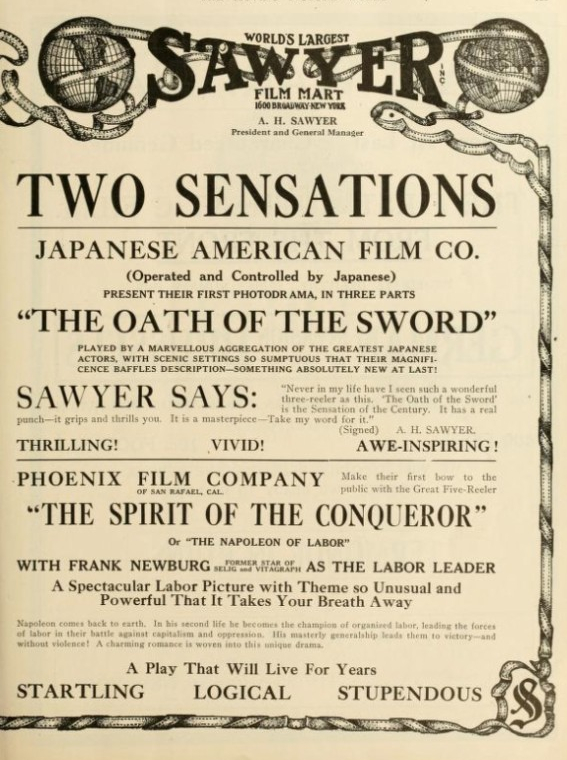
- Directed by: Frank Shaw
- Starring: Tomi Mori; Hisa Numa; Yutaka Abe
- Production company: Japanese American Film Company
- Distributed by: Sawyer Film Mart
- Release date: 1914
- Running time: 31 minutes
- Country: United States
- Language: Silent - English intertitles

The Oath of the Sword is an American silent film produced in 1914 by Frank Shaw. It is the oldest extant film currently known to be produced and performed by Asian Americans. It was selected by the National Film Preservation Board for induction and preservation in the Library of Congress' National Film Registry in 2025.

== Plot ==
Masao and Hisa are young lovers who are pledged to marry, but become separated when Masao leaves Japan to attend college at the University of California, Berkeley. While Masao attends Berkeley, he meets Captain Dean and his wife. In Japan, Hisa cares for her ailing father and is lonely without Masao. On his deathbed, her father gives Hisa a sacred family katana sword, telling her that if she sins, she must die by this sword. Captain Dean sails to Japan, is shipwrecked, and is saved when Hisa sees him floating on wreckage near the shore. They fall in love and have a child. Hisa's brother reminds her that she is pledged to Masao, and tells her that her relationship with Dean would mean she has to die by her own sword.

After four years at Berkeley, Masao returns after graduating, and upon entering Hisa' house, is shocked to find her with a baby. Dean appears, and when Masao confronts him, Dean strikes Masao violently, knocking him to the ground. Later, Masao chases Dean through the coastal village area, and in a violent confrontation kills Dean with his bare hands, At the same time, haunted by the sin of her own unfaithfulness, Hisa kills herself with the katana. Masao returns to the house to find her body and the infant child. The tragic ending illustrates the cultural clash between traditional Japanese beliefs and the perceived intrusion of American values.

== Cast ==
- Tomi Mori as Masao
- Hisa Numa as Hisa
- Yutaka Abe as Hisa’s brother
- Kohano Akashi as Gombei

== Production ==
The Oath of the Sword was produced by the Japanese American Film Company (JAFC), an independent production company established in Los Angeles by Japanese American businessmen who invested US$200,000 in seed capital to produce commercial, educational, and industrial features primarily for the Japanese American community even prior to the establishment of Hollywood as a cinema capitol. They brought over several stage actors from Japan, including Mori and Numa to form the basis of their stock company, who also attracted foreign sales of their work in Japan. The JAFC was created in the hope of introducing and normalizing Japanese immigration to the United States.

The three-reel silent drama primarily filmed on location in Berkeley, California and on the University of California campus, and was distributed by Sawyer Film Mart in the United States. Yutaka Abe (jp), who plays in a supporting role, was relatively unknown when the film was released. He would go on to appear in Cecil B. DeMille's 1915 film The Cheat, as well as in pioneering Chinese-American director James B. Leong's 1921 film Lotus Blossom, before returning to Japan to become a successful film director in his own right, with some 70 credits over a 35 year career to his name.

== Recovery ==
Like many films of the silent film era, especially those that largely failed to find commercial success at the time, it was long considered lost. Denise Khor, an associate professor of Asian American studies at Northeastern University culled historical newspapers and trade journals attempting to compile a list of early films made by Japanese Americans for her book, Transpacific Convergences, and sought to find a surviving print of any JA film to watch herself. In 2016, she finally came upon a print of The Oath of the Sword at the George Eastman Museum in Rochester, New York. Acquired by the museum in 1963, the original film print was too deteriorated to work with, but a safety print made from the original in 1980 was miraculously intact, and allowed Khor to restore the work together with the George Eastman Museum through a grant from the National Film Preservation Foundation.

The restored film premiered at the Academy Museum of Motion Pictures in 2023, and was inducted in the Library of Congress' National Film Registry in 2025.

== See also ==
- Benshi (弁士) - The Japanese practice of providing live narration to silent films
- Momijigari (film) - The oldest known surviving Japanese film (1899)
- National Film Archive of Japan - An institution specializing in preserving and exhibiting the film heritage of Japan
