= Aoikan =

Former cinema in Tokyo, Japan

Aoikan (葵館)
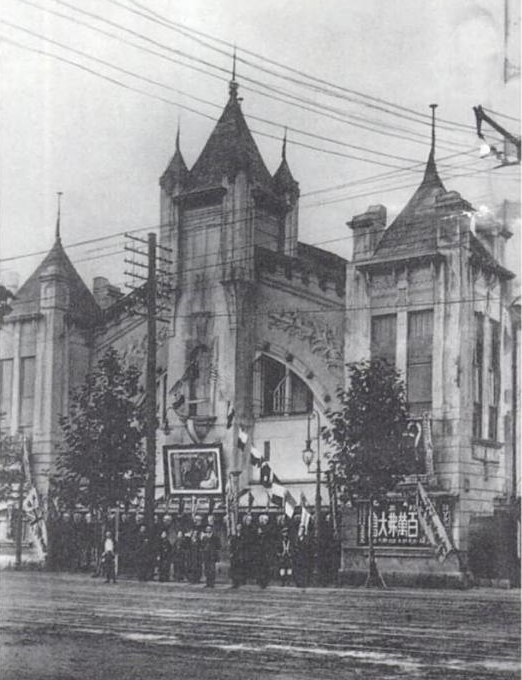
- Aoikan Theatre 1913

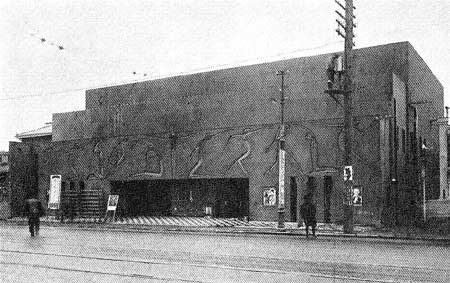
- Aoikan Theatre 1924
- Interactive map of Aoikan (葵館)
- Address: Minato-ku; Akasaka, Tokyo; Japan
- Coordinates: 35°40′12″N 139°44′24″E

Construction
- Opened: July 1913
- Reopened: 1924
- Demolished: 1931

The Aoikan (葵館) was a movie theater in the Tameike section of Akasaka in Tokyo, Japan. It existed since the mid-1910s as a high-class foreign film theater, featuring benshi such as Musei Tokugawa.

After the 1923 earthquake, it re-opened in October 1924 with a new, modern design created by prominent avant-garde artists. Seisaku Yoshikawa was in charge of architectural design, Yasuji Ogishima did the sculptural reliefs on the front of the building, and Tomoyoshi Murayama designed the interior. Murayama also did the cover illustrations for the theater's pamphlets in the first few years.
