= Eiko Minami =

Japanese dancer

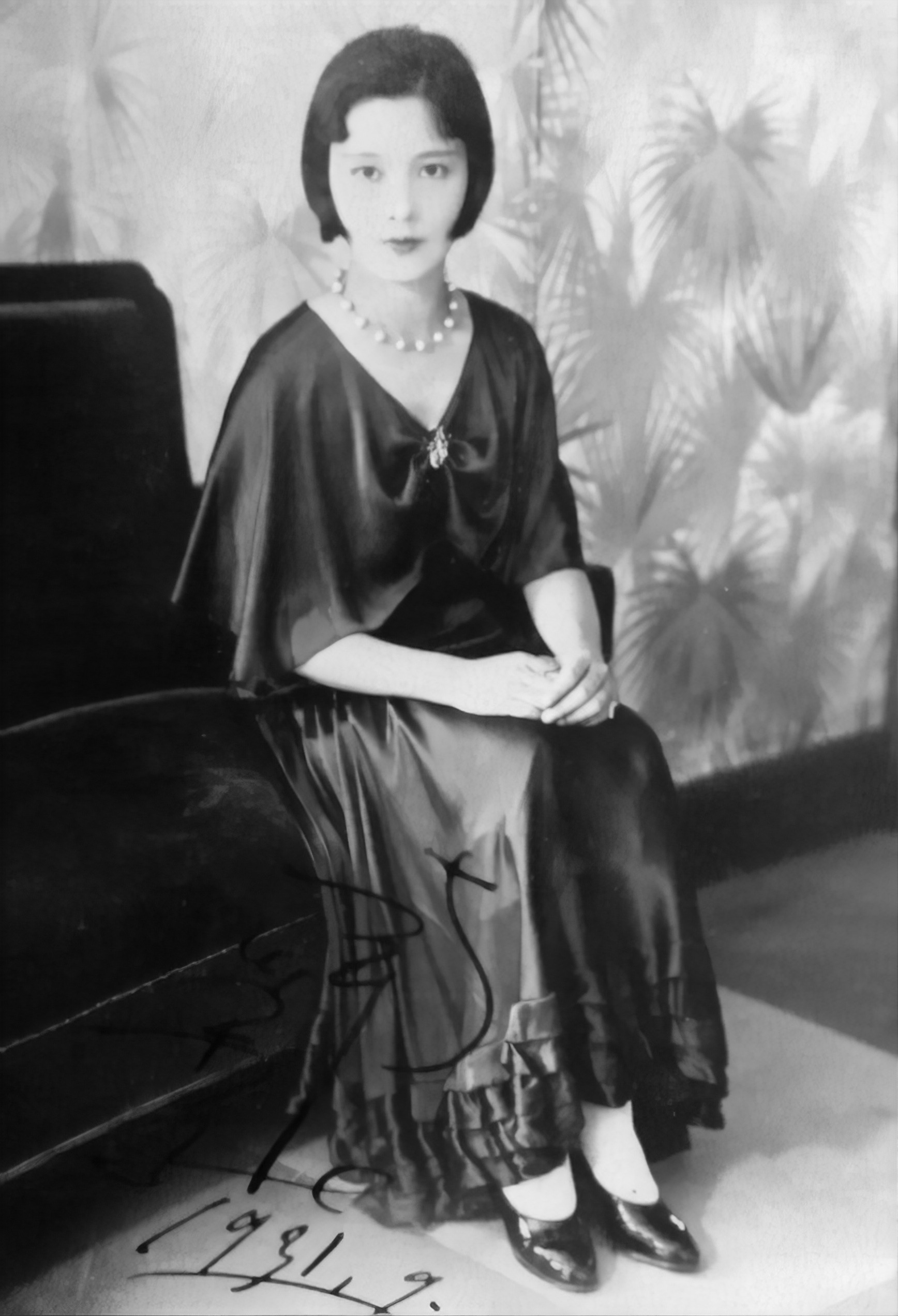
- Autographed photo, 1931
- Born: Sakae Gosha; February 20, 1909; Onomichi, Hiroshima Prefecture, Japan
- Died: Unknown
- Occupations: Dancer, actress

Eiko Minami (南 栄子, Minami Eiko; February 20, 1909 – date of death unknown) was a Japanese dancer.

== Biography ==
Eiko Minami was born Sakae Gosha (五社 栄, Gosha Sakae) in Onomichi, Hiroshima Prefecture. She joined the Shōchiku Gakugekibu theater revue in Osaka in 1923 as a member of its second class, where she learned the basics of dance under head instructor Rikuhei Umemoto (楳茂都陸平). She also studied dance under the famous Russian ballerina Xenia Makletzova. Throughout her career, Minami was active mainly on stage, performing solo dance recitals in venues across Japan and as part of theater companies throughout Asia.

She also appeared in films, with her best known role being that of a dancer in a mental hospital in Teinosuke Kinugasa's 1926 avant-garde classic A Page of Madness. Following this, she joined the Nikkatsu film studio in Kyoto, making her second known film appearance in 1927's Tabigeinin, directed by Yutaka Abe and Yasunaga Higashibōjō. Tabigeinin is now lost and it is unknown what role she played in the film. That same year, she and four other Nikkatsu actresses cut their hair into a bob style, which caused a conflict with studio head Kōkyū Ikenaga, who forbade them from appearing in any further films unless they grew their hair back. Minami remained with Nikkatsu as a dance instructor and choreographer, after which she moved to Tokyo to work as a dance instructor at Nihon Eiga Haiyū Gakkō, an acting school founded in 1923 by Biyō Minaguchi (水口薇陽).

In late 1928, she was on tour in Manchuria as a featured performer in Yoshiko Okada's theater company. Around this time, she rose to prominence with her stage show by performing the Charleston, which earned her the nickname Goddess of Ero (エロの女神, Ero no megami), along with a positive mention in The Scarlet Gang of Asakusa. In 1934, she opened the Minami Buyō Kenkyūsho, her own dance school where she taught students. In 1939, she changed her stage name to Reiko Gosha (五社玲子), while continuing to teach dance throughout wartime.

== Filmography ==
- A Page of Madness (1926) - Dancer
- Tabigeinin (1927)

== Gallery ==
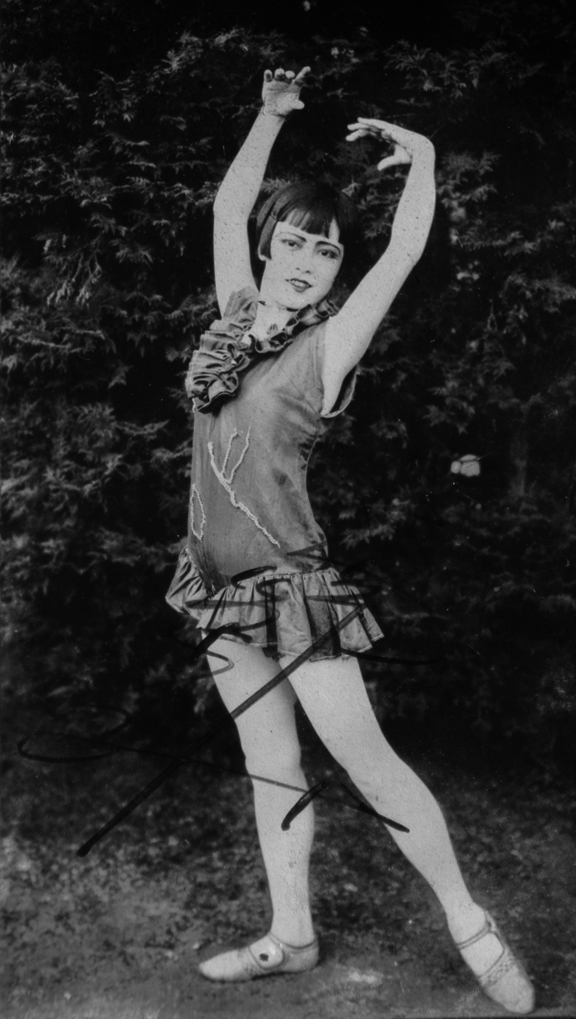

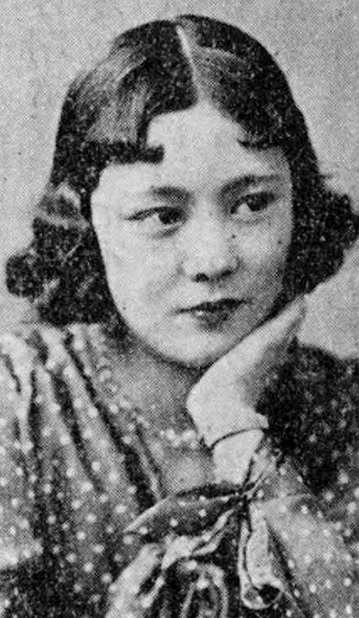

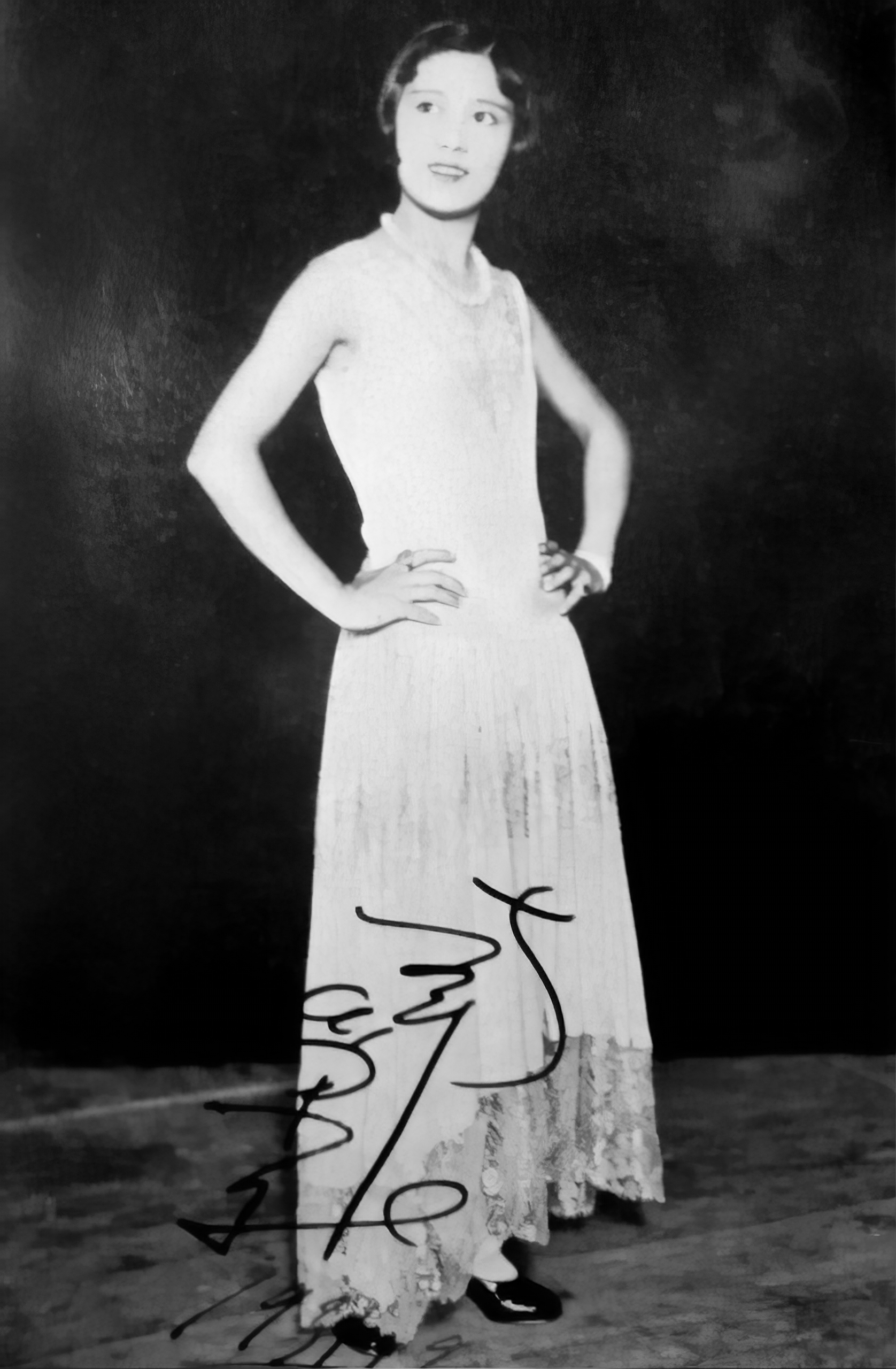

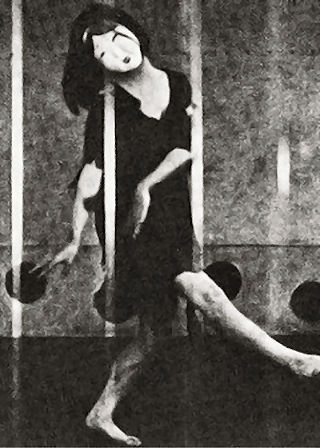

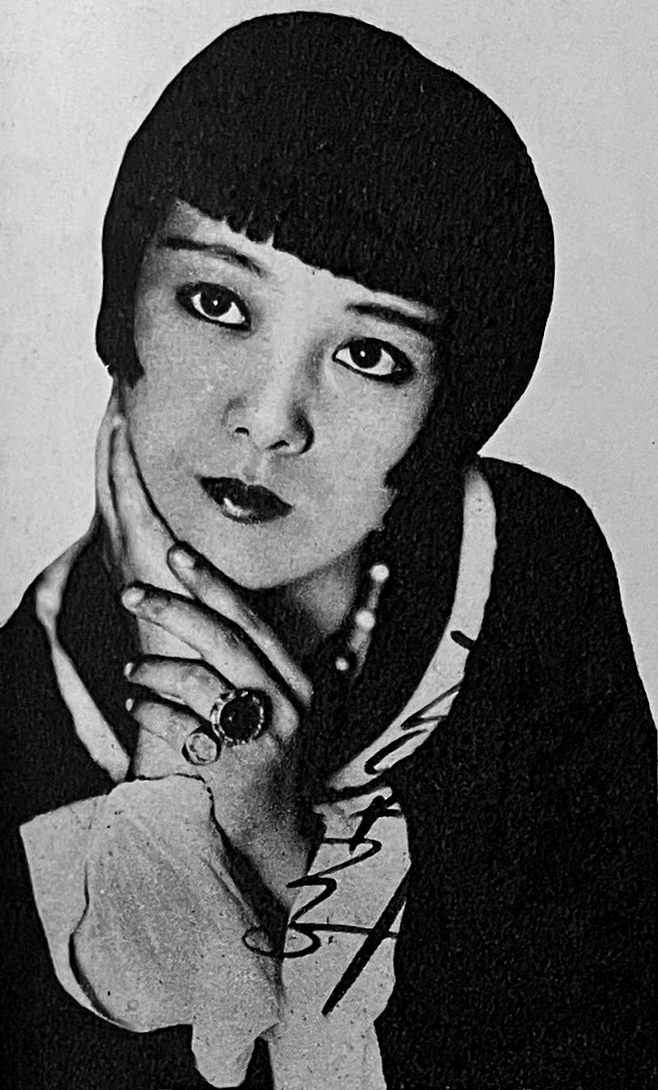

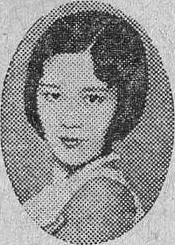
