= Musei Tokugawa =

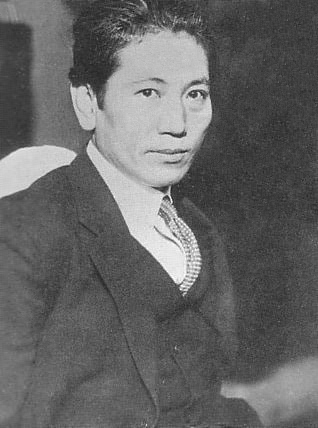
- Musei Tokugawa
- Born: Toshio Fukuhara; 13 April 1894; Masuda, Shimane, Japan
- Died: 1 August 1971 (aged 77)
- Occupations: Film actor, raconteur

Musei Tokugawa (徳川 夢声, Tokugawa Musei; 13 April 1894 – 1 August 1971) was a Japanese benshi, actor, raconteur, essayist, and radio and television personality.

== Career ==
Musei (as he was called) first came to prominence as a benshi, a narrator of films during the silent era in Japan. He was celebrated for his restrained but erudite narration that was popular among intellectual film fans. He concentrated on foreign films such as The Cabinet of Dr. Caligari at high-class theaters like the Aoikan and the Musashinokan, but also performed Japanese works such as Teinosuke Kinugasa's experimental masterpiece A Page of Madness (1926).

As the silent era ended, Musei switched to storytelling on stage and on radio, and also began acting and doing narrations in films.

He was also famous for his essays, humorous novels, and autobiographical writings, publishing nearly fifty books in his life. With the advent of television in Japan, Musei also became a prominent presence in that medium.
