= Mari (Noh play) =

Noh play

Mari (鞠, The Football) is a Noh play that is no longer part of the current repertoire. (Note: Plays outside the current repertoire and that are no longer performed are referred to as 番外謡曲 (bangai yōkyoku). The noh play Mari is distinct from the kyōgen or comic Noh interlude Mari-zatō (鞠座頭, Blindman's Football). A Japanese text of Mari may be found in Kōchū Yōkyoku sōsho 校註謡曲叢書 第3巻 補遺 3–6, by Haga and Sakaki 芳賀矢一, 佐佐木信綱.)

== Background ==
The Mari was the football in the ancient Japanese game of Kemari, a non-competitive form of Keepie uppie popular in the Heian period. The object of the game was to keep the deerskin ball aloft as long as possible without using one's hands. The game was popular among samurai, the youthful Saigyō, for example, being an expert player.

== Plot ==
The death of a prominent footballer drives his widow mad, and she prepares a kind of kemari funeral-service for him: the eight football players are taken as equivalent to the eight chapters of the Hokke Scripture; with the four posts added, they correspond to the Twelvefold chain of causation.

Arthur Waley states that "The play ends with a 'football ballet'".
