= Takeo Takei =

Japanese painter

- 武井 武雄
- Takeo Takei at his childhood home.
- Born: June 25, 1894; Suwa District, Nagano Prefecture, Japan
- Died: February 7, 1983 (aged 88); Tokyo Prefecture, Japan
- Known for: Illustration for children

Takeo Takei (武井 武雄, Takei Takeo; 25 June 1894 – 7 February 1983) was a Japanese painter and puppet maker best known for his illustrations for children.

Takeo Takei is among Japan's most influential children's illustrators of the twentieth century. He was one of the first to create high-quality illustrations for children and was an early advocate of making artwork that respected and nurtured a child's imagination. Nearly one hundred years after his work was first published, his influence in illustration, manga, animation, graphic design, computer game character and even advertising is as strong as ever.

== Life ==
Takeo Takei was born the first son and the only child of Kei-ichiro and Sachi Takei on 25 June 1894, in Hirano-village (now Okaya-city), Nagano Prefecture, Japan. Takei was a very artistic child, he drew his first illustration when he was three years old. He spent many hours alone at home (in his case due to weak constitution). When he was in the 2nd grade of primary school, he went to school two weeks in total, because of frequent illness. In these days, he immersed himself in drawing and writing, he imagined a fairy named "Mito" in his fantasy, and he played with it. This aspect of his childhood would later inform his deep respect for the artistic mind of the child.

Although originally discouraged by his father (the mayor of Hirano village) from becoming an artist, Takei ultimately attended the Tokyo Art School (known today as the Tokyo University of the Arts, the leading art school in the country and the alma mater of many renowned artists in Japan) with his blessing. There, he studied Western-style art and painting and graduated in 1919.

Kodomo no kuni vol.1, 1922

In 1922, Takei's artwork was on the first cover of the groundbreaking children's publication Kodomo no kuni, which published artwork, songs, craft projects, and stories for children until 1944. It embodied a democratic and individualistic approach to children's education that emerged during the Taisho democracy in Japan (1912–1926), and that mirrored Takei's personal philosophy.

His output was prodigious in the 1920s: He wrote and illustrated his own stories, as well as Japanese folktales and other original fairy tales by Japanese writers such as Kenji Miyazawa. He also illustrated non-Japanese stories such as "The Thousand and One Nights" and in 1928, the fairy tales of Hans Christian Andersen.

In 1927, Takei helped found the Nihon Doga Kyokai (Japan Association of Illustration for Children). At various times in his career, he also had a role as reviewer and selector of illustrations for various magazines. Sadly, much of Takeo's original artwork was destroyed by fire in Tokyo during World War II.

== Works ==
Dōbutsu no Mura (The animal village), 1928

The works of Takeo Takei are classified in three. The first one is the illustrations for children, "Doga" in Japanese. The second is the woodblock prints,"Hanga". The other is the making books of various materials,"Kanpon".

=== Illustrations For Children (Doga) ===
Takei's mediums of choice for his fantastical, surreal, but always accessible drawings were watercolors, crayon, and pen and ink.

In 1926, Takei published one of his most famous books, "Ramu-Ramu O" (King Ramu-Ramu). In 1928, he published "Dōbutsu no Mura" (The Animal Village).

=== Woodblock Prints (Hanga) ===
As a bookseller, Takei was well known to Kōshirō Onchi; the two were also fellow members of the Han no Kai, exchanging New Year's cards from 1935 onward, and it was Onchi who was instrumental in persuading Takei to contribute for the first time to the Ichimokushū collection in 1950. When Takei first became interested in printmaking, he abandoned oil painting entirely, his own way of stepping outside the frame, in a casual but apparent consonance with the Western avant-gardes he had long studied. Takei did not settle into either the shin-hanga or the sōsaku-hanga camp, but coined a new term, irufu, to describe what he was doing with his toy and print designs, meaning to underscore a relationship with the past that was not one of rupture but of rethinking.

=== Books of various materials (Kanpon) ===
Kanpon literally means "published book." Takei used this term and employed it to his own exploration of the expressive potential of the medium of the book.

== Childhood house ==
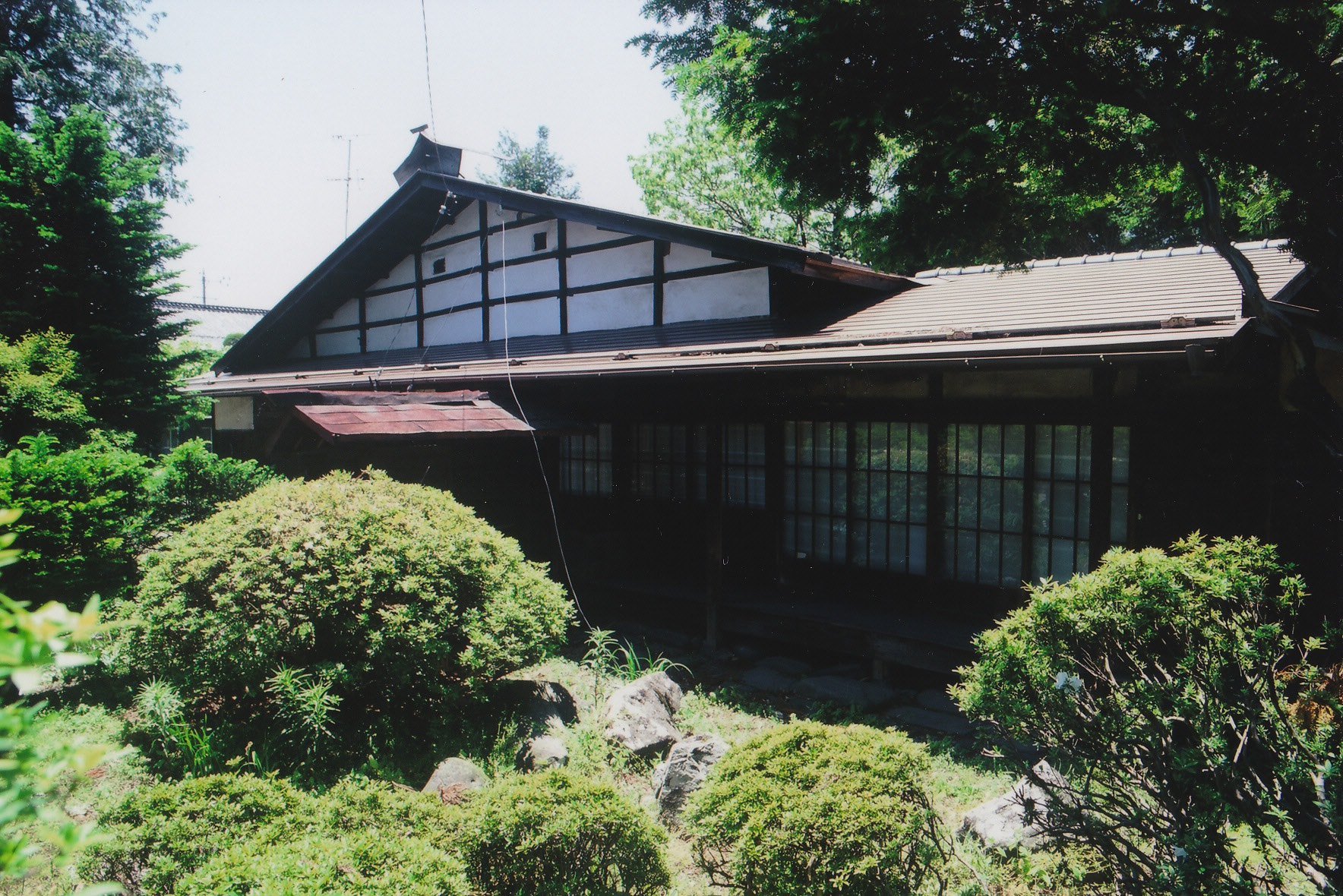
Takeo Takei's childhood house(a samurai residence)

The house which Takeo Takei had lived until he was 19 years old is still standing in Okaya, Nagano Prefecture, Japan. It was built in 1698 or 1699, over 300 years ago, so it is one of the oldest houses in Japan. It was a samurai residence, of which there very few, as they are usually made of wood and paper. Okaya-city municipal office, the owner of this house since 2008, decided to destroy. Many people have been against it and work for a social movement in which people maintain the house as a cultural asset for preservation.

== Museum ==
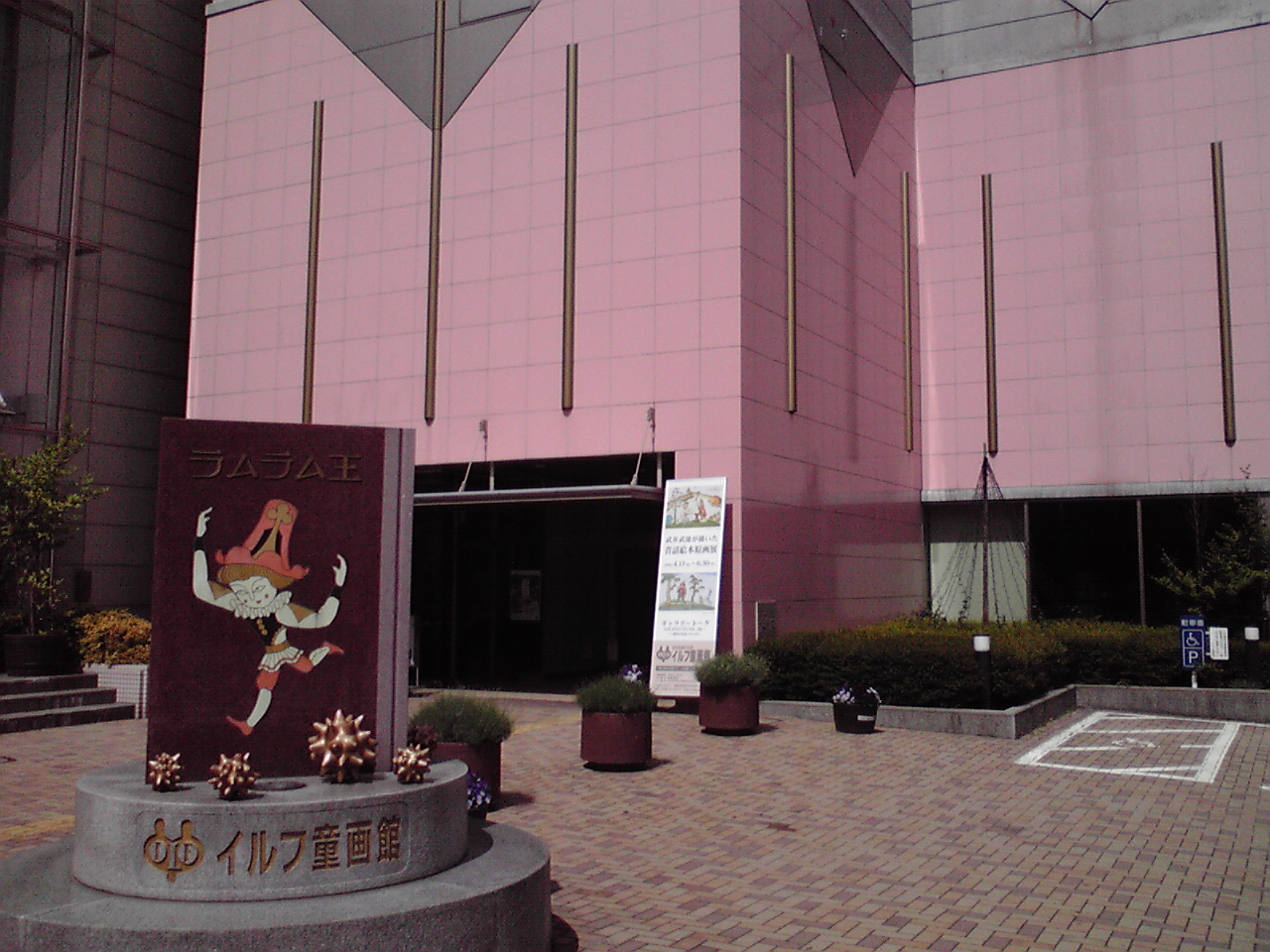
ILF Museum

There is a memorial museum dedicated to Takeo Takei: The ILF Doga Museum (イルフ童画館・長野県岡谷市, located in Okaya, Nagano, since 1998) . It collects and exhibits original illustrations of children's books by Takeo Takei, Maurice Sendak and other artists.
