= Benshi =

Japanese performers who provided live narration for silent films

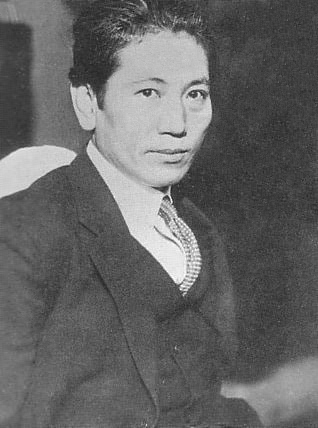
Musei Tokugawa, famous benshi

Benshi (弁士) were Japanese performers who provided live narration for silent films (both Japanese films and Western films). Benshi are sometimes called katsudō-benshi (活動弁士) or katsuben (活弁).

== Role ==
The earliest films available for public display were produced by Western studios, portraying brief scenes of everyday life, often less than a minute long. The first benshi were thus hired to provide greater value for the high ticket prices charged by theaters relative to other public entertainment, while also giving technical and cultural context to the audience. The operation of the projector itself would be described before the showing, and then explanations of Western culture would accompany the film with the benshi standing to the side of the screen. This commentary was as much part of the theater-going experience as the film itself. In one instance, a benshi was able to avoid government censorship of The Kiss by describing kissing in Western culture to be as casual a greeting as a pat on the back. As film plots became longer and more complex, benshi often spoke for the characters on-screen in theatrical style and played multiple roles. Stemming from the traditions of kabuki, noh and bunraku theaters, the benshi's narration and general commentary were an important part of the Japanese silent film experience. The benshi also provided translation for foreign (mostly American) movies.

Much like in the West, Japanese silent films were often accompanied by live music (in addition to the benshi). However, unlike Western films, which tended to have a theatre organ as accompaniment, Japanese films had a score which supported the traditional Japanese instruments of a kabuki play. Since benshi performed without external amplification, they had to carefully coordinate with the orchestra to be heard. At that time, theaters typically seated 1000, so a trademark of successful benshi was the ability to project their voices into large spaces.

Famous benshi active in the silent era include Musei Tokugawa (at the Aoikan and Musashinokan theaters), Saburō Somei (at the Denkikan), Rakuten Nishimura, Raiyū Ikoma (at the Teikokukan), Mitsugu Ōkura, and Shirō Ōtsuji.

== Influence on film aesthetic ==
As the film industry and art form developed in Japan, the presence of a benshi came to be part of the film. Benshi read the intertitles on silent films and voiced all on-screen characters. Perhaps most significantly for filmmakers, benshi would add their own commentary, explaining what was happening in a shot or describing what had happened in confusing edits or sudden transitions. Some benshi were known to interpret and add to a script, for example reciting poetry to accompany a moving visual.

In addition, it was traditional for the benshi to introduce the film, even giving a brief lecture about the history of the setting. This meant that filmmakers could assume that a live narrator, accustomed to improvisation, would be present at the showing to explain scenes or even explain missing scenes or unfilmed action.

Perhaps because most early Japanese films were simply kabuki plays adapted to film, the characterization style benshi performed roles strongly influenced by the narrators in kabuki or a noh chorus—a grave, dramatic, exaggerated style. Due to the influence of kabuki, audiences were not distracted by a single benshi voicing male and female roles, regardless of the gender of the benshi.

== Influence on film industry ==
In 1927, there were 6,818 benshi, including 180 women. Many benshi were famous in their own right and garnered great acclaim. The presence of a benshi was the aspect of the film presentation that drew in the audience, more so than the actors appearing in the film, and promotional posters would frequently include a photo of the benshi announcing the movie.

The silent film era lasted until the mid-1930s in Japan in part due to benshi, despite the introduction of sound in full-length films in the late 1920s. The adoption of this new technology was slowed by the popularity and influence of the benshi (in addition to the high costs to the cinemas and production companies). Though the tradition has mostly faded, there are a few remaining active benshi in Japan (e.g., Midori Sawato).

=== Today ===
In Kayo Hatta's 1995 American film Picture Bride, Toshirō Mifune plays a small role as a benshi who travels to sugar cane plantations in Hawaii during the early 20th century, and Masayuki Suo's 2019 Japanese film Talking the Pictures features an aspiring benshi who uses the art of benshi to distract audiences while his accomplices rob them, finally gets the opportunity to become a real benshi.

The art of the benshi has seen a renaissance in recent years with modern-day benshi Ichiro Kataoka (片岡一郎), Kumiko Omori, and Hideyuki Yamashiro participating in a world tour in 2024, performing in half a dozen cities across the United States and Japan in a collaboration between the Yanai Initiative, Waseda University, and the University of California, Los Angeles. Their slate of 28 films included the recently rediscovered Japanese American silent film The Oath of the Sword.

== Benshi in other cultures ==
- The benshi tradition was adopted in Taiwan under the name piansu (Chinese: 辯士; Pe̍h-ōe-jī: piān-sū).
- Benshi were present in Korea from the first decade of the twentieth century, where they were called byeonsa (변사).

== New benshi practices ==
The underlying concept of benshi, live narration of film, continues to work its way into performance practices. The actual practice of "benshi" is most commonly referenced in relation to live film narration largely due to it having been and when the practice was more formalized and financed. As evidenced by the (above) listings of "benshi" in other cultures, the art of cinema accompanied by a live performer was as international then as it is now.

There are groups in the United States seeking to revive this form and to continue exploring the possibilities of altering the form in the spirit of experimentation from which the practice emerged. Likewise, new attempts to subvert traditional notions of storytelling and film watching are underway. Some performers interject commentary into films, drawing from a century of social critique, often presenting popular films along with new dialog and narrative intended to juxtapose their ideas with those of the audience. While some have adopted the term "Neo-Benshi", other performers have chosen to adopt the title "movieteller" as an alternative. They believe it emphasizes the multicultural past and future(s) of the form, while inviting further experimentation with the medium, such as a live narration of one's own films, the implementation of instruments as narrative devices, or any instance where a human contingent mediates between an audience and an image.

== Modern benshi ==
- Enju (縁寿) - formerly known as Yuko Saito
- Ichirō Kataoka (片岡一郎)
- Kumiko Omori (大森くみこ)
- Midori Sawato
- Hirono Yamada (山田広野)
- Vanilla Yamazaki
- Asoko Yata (麻生子八咫)

== Bibliography ==
- Nowell-Smith, Geoffrey (1996). The Oxford History of World Cinema. ISBN 0-19-874242-8.
- Dym, Jeffrey A. (August 2003). Benshi, Japanese Silent Film Narrators, and their Forgotten Narrative Art of Setsumei A History of Japanese Silent Film Narration. Edwin Mellen Press. ISBN 0-7734-6648-7.
- Emmerich, Michael (August 2024). World of the Benshi. Yanai Initiative. ISBN 9798989932405.
