= Kemari =

Japanese football game

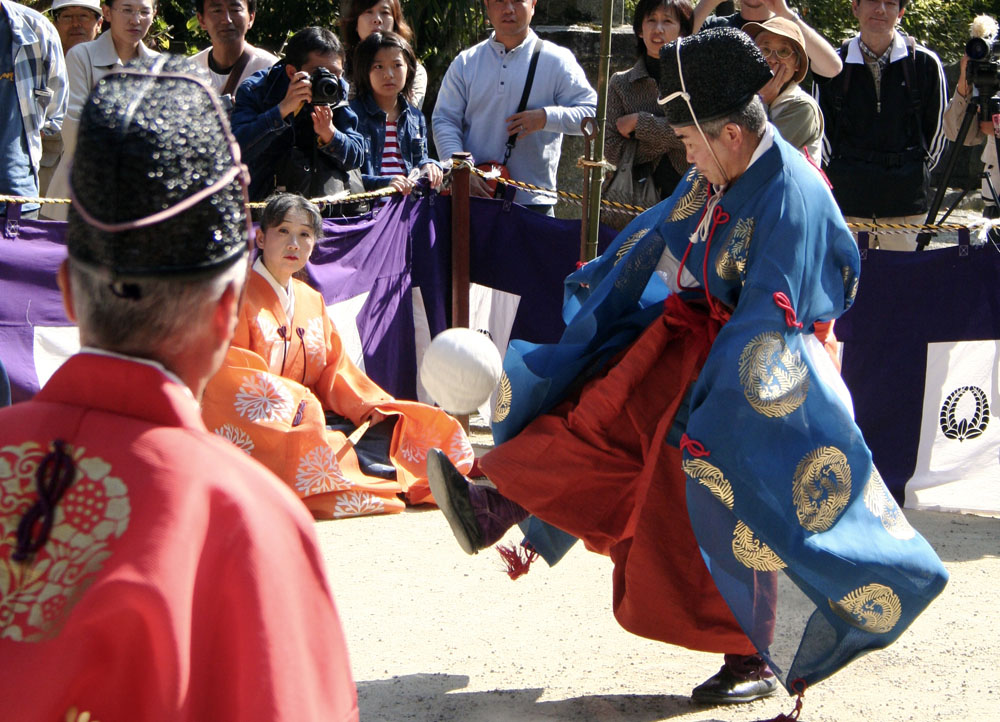
A game of kemari at Tanzan Shrine

Kemari (蹴鞠) is an athletic football game that was popular during the Heian (794–1185) and Kamakura (1185–1333) periods of Japan. It resembles a game of keepie uppie or hacky sack.

The game was popular in Kyoto, the capital, and the surrounding Kansai region, and over time it spread from the aristocracy to the samurai and chōnin classes.

Nowadays, kemari is played as a seasonal event mainly at Shinto shrines in Kansai. Players play in a costume called kariginu (ja:狩衣), which was worn as everyday clothing by court nobles during the Heian period.

== History ==
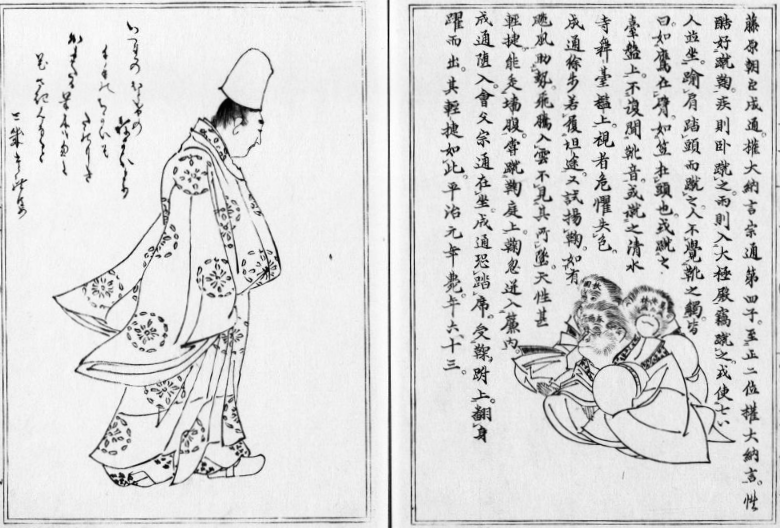
Woodblock print depicting Kemari expert Fujiwara no Narimichi (1097–1162) and three monkeys, guardian deities of the game

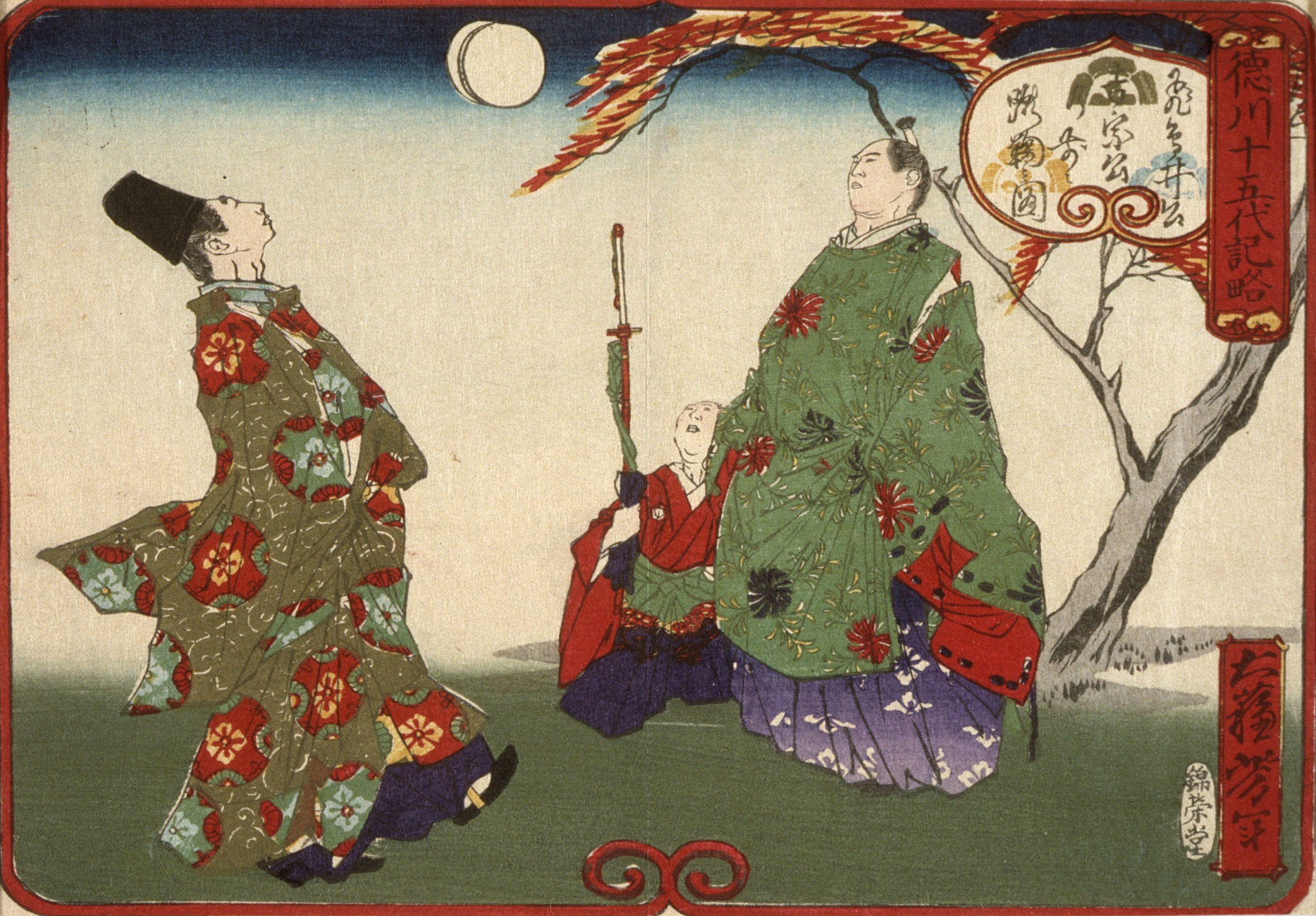
"Asukai Masanori Teaching Tokugawa Yoshimune to Play Kemari." Ukiyo-e printed by Tsukioka Yoshitoshi.

The earliest kemari was created under the influence of the Chinese sport cuju, which is written with the same kanji.

It is often said that the earliest evidence of kemari is the record for 644 in the Nihon Shoki, but this theory is disputed. In 644, Prince Naka-no-Ōe (later enthroned as Emperor Tenji) and Fujiwara no Kamatari, who later initiated the Taika Reforms, became friends during a ball game described as butsumari (打鞠), but it may have been a field hockey-like ball game using a cane instead.

The earliest reliable documentary evidence of the word kemari (蹴鞠) is found in a record of an annual event called Honchō gatsuryo (ja:本朝月令) written in the middle of the Heian period. According to the records, games of kemari were played in May 701.

Kemari became popular as a game for the nobility in the late Heian in the 11th century, and in the 12th century, Fujiwara no Narimichi (ja:藤原成通) and Nanba Yorisuke (ja:難波頼輔) gained fame as masters of kemari. Fujiwara no Narimichi made more than 50 visits to the Kumano Hongū Taisha to pray that his kemari skills would improve, and he performed a kemari feat known as backwards ball (後ろ鞠, ushiro mari) in front of where Susanoo was enshrined. This technique is keepie uppie performed on the heel.

Games of kemari were often played during the reign of the second Kamakura shogun, Minamoto no Yoriie (1202–1203). This led to the establishment of a variety of new rules, equipment, and techniques, and to the completion of a structured art form known as kemaridō (蹴鞠道).

In the Kamakura, kemari became popular among the samurai. In the Muromachi (1336–1573), kemari, along with various other performing arts such as waka (poetry) and Japanese tea ceremony, was regarded as one of the art forms that the samurai class was encouraged to master.

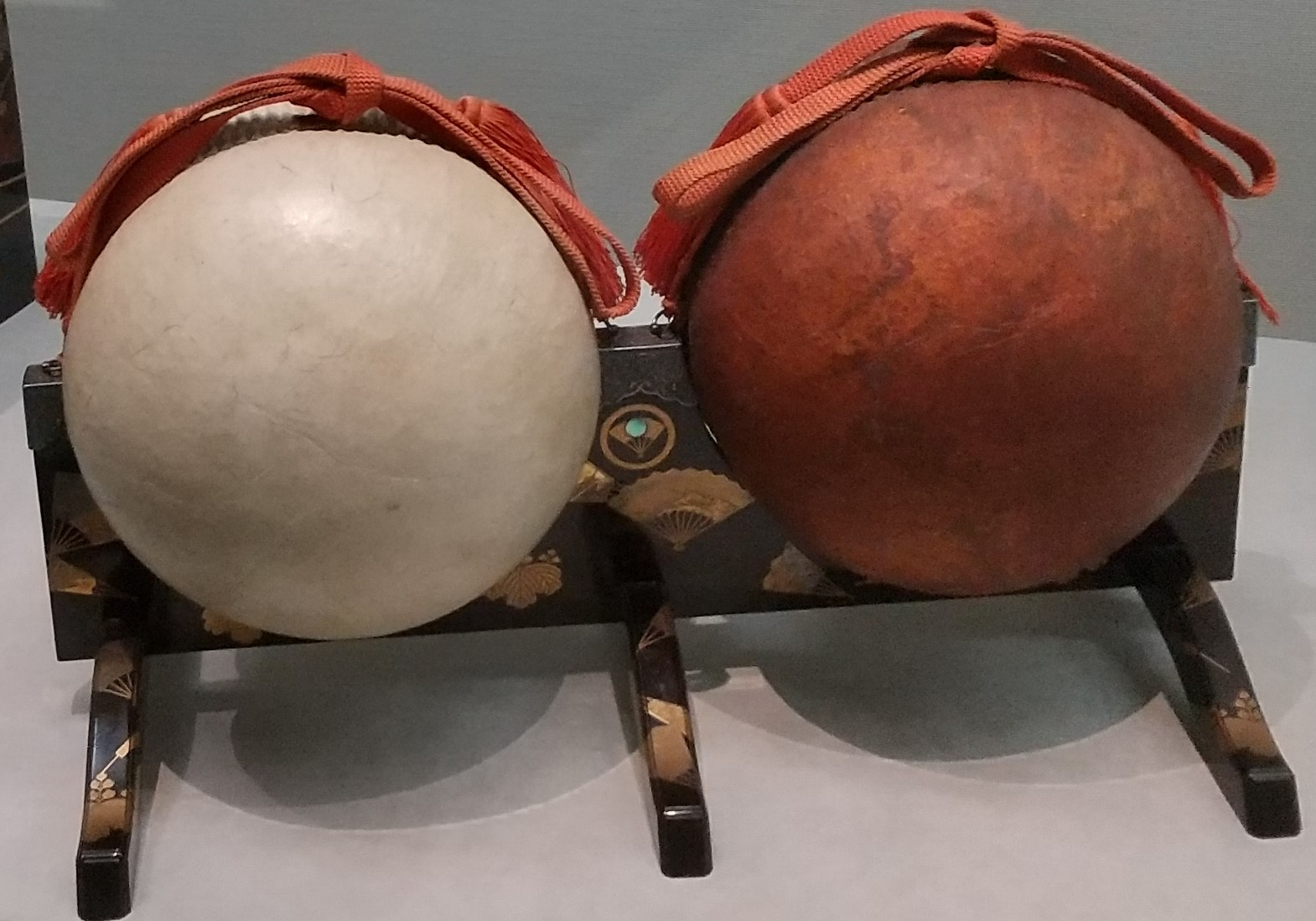
Decorative kemari balls (Edo period), probably belonging to the Satake clan

In the Sengoku period (1467–1615), sumo became popular and kemari declined, but in the Edo period (1683–1868), it became popular again as a game played by the chōnin class in the Kansai.

In the past, aristocrats living in Kyoto played kemari as an annual event on New Year's Day, January 4. Emperor Meiji feared that the rapid modernization of Japan would lead to the loss of various traditional Japanese cultures, and in 1903, an association was established to preserve kemari by contributing an imperial grant. Today, kemari is performed as a seasonal event in shrines around the Kansai, such as Shimogamo Shrine, Shiramine Shrine, Fujimori Shrine (ja:藤森神社), Tanzan Shrine, Hirano Shrine and Kotohira-gū. Seidai-myōjin (精大明神), enshrined in one of the sessha (auxiliary shrine) of Shiramine Shrine, is the kami of the mari (the kemari ball) and is therefore respected by players of various ball games, mainly association football.

George H. W. Bush played the game on one of his presidential visits to Japan.

== Description ==
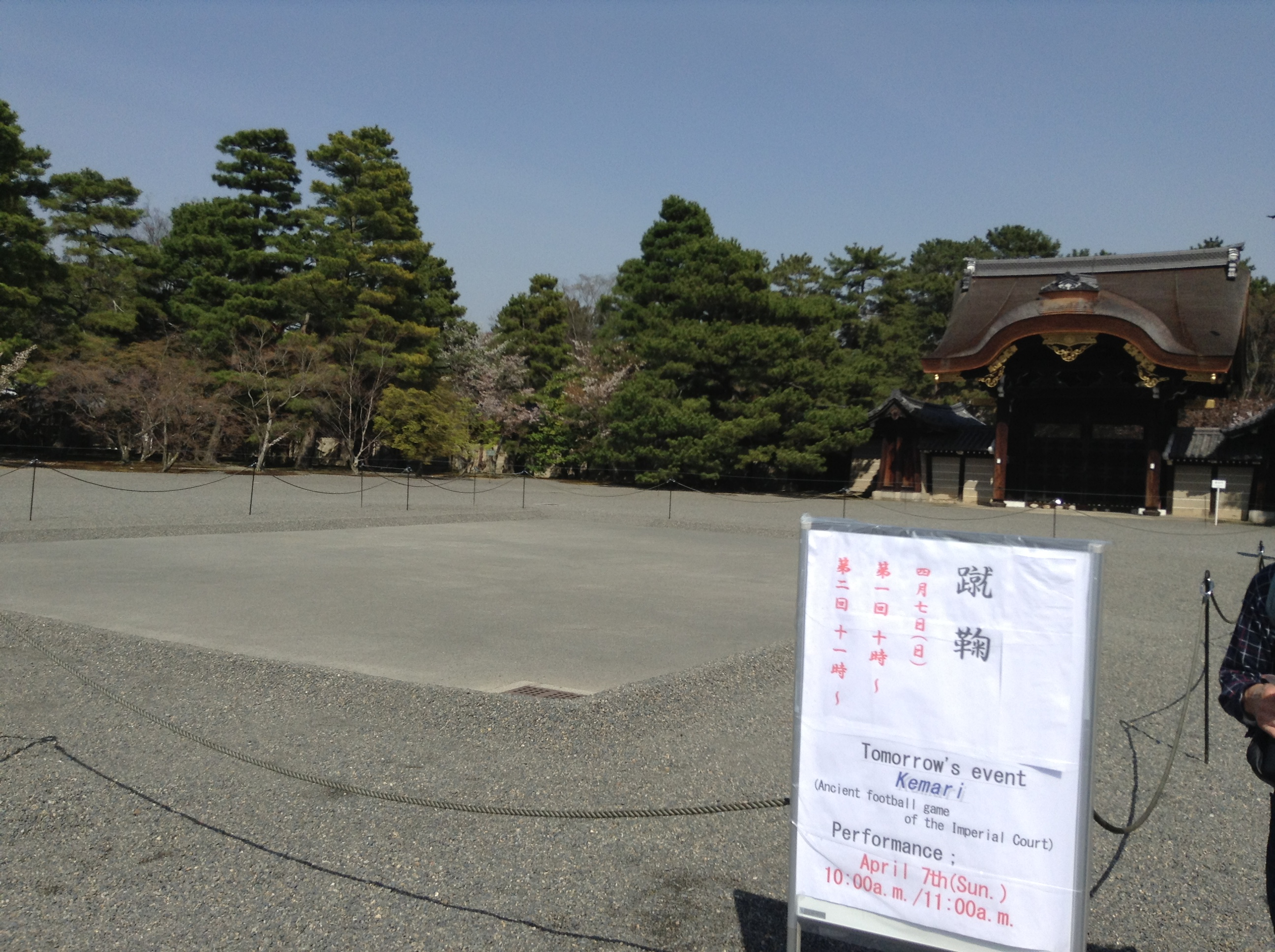
Kemari field at Kyoto Imperial Palace

Kemari is a non-competitive sport. The object of kemari is to keep one ball in the air, with all players cooperating to do so. Players may use any body part with the exception of arms and hands: their head, feet, knees, back, and depending on the rules, elbows to keep the ball aloft. The ball, known as a mari, is made of deerskin with the hair facing inside and the hide on the outside. The ball is stuffed with barley grains to give it shape. When the hide has set in this shape, the grains are removed from the ball, and it is then sewn together using the skin of a horse. The one who kicks the ball is called a mariashi. A good mariashi makes it easy for the receiver to control the mari, and serves it with a soft touch to make it easy to keep the mari in the air.

Kemari is played on a flat ground, about 6–7 meters squared. The uniforms that the modern players wear are reminiscent of the clothes of the Heian period and include a crow hat. This type of clothing was called kariginu (ja:狩衣) and it was fashionable at that time.

== See also ==
- Mari (Noh play)
