= Cotsen Children's Library =

Specialist library at Princeton University Library

The Cotsen Children's Library is a specialist library within the Department of Rare Books and Special Collections at Princeton University Library.

It is an international research collection of illustrated children's books, manuscripts, original artwork, prints, and educational toys from the 15th century to the present day, presented to the library by its owner, Lloyd E. Cotsen, in 1997. The collection has important holdings of materials in several languages, including English, Chinese, Czech, Dutch, French, German, Greek, Hebrew, Italian, Japanese, Latin and Russian.

Treasures include an early-Coptic Christian schoolbook; medieval manuscripts; scrapbooks from Hans Christian Andersen; drawings by Edward Lear, K.F.E. Freyhold, and Samuil Marshak; picture letters by Beatrix Potter; early editions of fairy tales by Madame d’Aulnoy, Charles Perrault, and the Brothers Grimm; a large collection of books published by John Newbery; Soviet Constructivist children's books; American dime novels; moveable books; jigsaw puzzles; educational playing cards; and other toys through the ages. It also houses the best collection of Japanese children's books outside of Japan (over 10,000 items), and of Chinese children's books outside of China (over 35,000 items).

== Publications relating to specific collections held in the Cotsen Children's Library ==
The following is a selection only.

- The Dartons, Publishers of Educational Aids Pastimes & Juvenile Ephemera, 1787 – 1876: A Bibliographical Checklist. Together with a description of the Darton Archive as held by the Cotsen Children’s Library, Princeton University Library & A brief history of printed teaching aids. By Jill Shefrin. Los Angeles: Cotsen Occasional Press, 2009.
- The Glory of the Art of Writing: The Calligraphic Work of Francesco Alunno of Ferrara. By Nicolas Barker. Los Angeles: Cotsen Occasional Press, 2009.
- The Dawn of Wisdom: Selections from the Japanese Collection of the Cotsen Children’s Library. Edited by Don J. Cohn, with text by Ann Herring. Los Angeles: The Cotsen Occasional Press, 2000.
- Neatly Dissected for the Instruction of Young Ladies and Gentlemen in the Knowledge of Geography: John Spilsbury and Early Dissected Puzzles by Jill Shefrin. Los Angeles: The Cotsen Occasional Press, 1999.
- The Beatrix Potter Collection of Lloyd Cotsen published on the occasion of his 75th birthday, by Margit Sperling Cotsen, Judy Taylor, Anne Stevenson Hobbs, and Ivy Trent. Los Angeles: Cotsen Occasional Press, 2004.
- Nip and the Chocolate: A Picture Letter from Beatrix Potter to Winifred Warne; April 14, 1906 . Introduction by Ivy Trent. Los Angeles and Princeton: Cotsen Family Foundation and the Cotsen Children's Library, 2004.
- Readers in the Cotsen Children's Library. Introductions by Andrea Immel. Princeton: Princeton University Library, 2005.
- A Catalogue of the Cotsen Children's Library - a multi-volume project, initiated in 1996, completed in 2021. In print: volume I, the twentieth century A-L (May 2000), and volume II, the twentieth century M-Z (December 2003). As well as: The nineteenth century: 1. A-K. 2. L-Z -- (January 2019); The pre-1801 imprints: 1. A-K. 2. L-Z (July 2020); Comprehensive index: 1. Author index; title index; illustrator index; series index. 2. General & subject index; owner & collector index; chronological index. (June 2021)
- Imagerie populaire : French pictorial broadsides for children in the Cotsen Children's Library : twelve prints from the exhibition, Milberg Gallery, Firestone Library, July 10, 2009 – January 24, 2010. By Andrea Immel, 2009.
