= Tomoyoshi Murayama =

Japanese artist (1901–1977)

Murayama Tomoyoshi
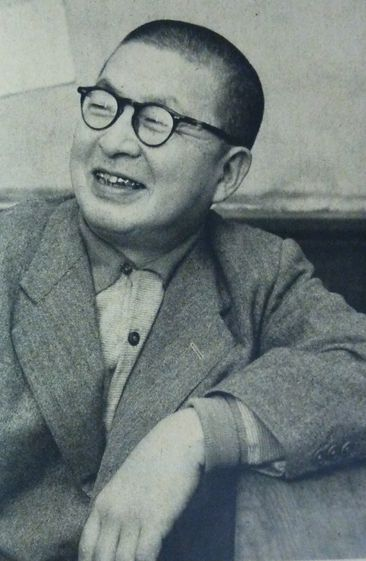
- Born: 18 January 1901; Kanda, Tokyo, Japan
- Died: 22 March 1977 (aged 76); Tokyo, Japan
- Occupation: Writer
- Writing career
- Genre: stage plays

Tomoyoshi Murayama (村山 知義, Murayama Tomoyoshi; 18 January 1901 – 22 March 1977) was a Japanese artist, play writer, novelist and drama producer active during the Shōwa period in Japan.

== Early life ==
Murayama was born in the Kanda Suehiro district of Tokyo. His father, who was a medic in the Imperial Japanese Navy, died when he was nine years old. His mother became a fervent Christian after having been converted by Uchimura Kanzo, and was active in the pacifist movement. Murayama was initially encouraged towards watercolors and traditional Japanese painting, but was later drawn to philosophy, particularly the works of German philosophers Arthur Schopenhauer and Nietzsche. He converted to Christianity himself after being assaulted by fellow students for echoing his mother's pacifist views.

Murayama started out his career after the Westernization campaign of the Meiji era (1868-1912). Murayama entered Tokyo Imperial University in 1921 with the intention of studying philosophy, but soon left to study art and drama at the Humboldt University of Berlin, Germany. During his stay in Berlin, he developed connections to European avantgarde artists, facilitated particularly by Herwarth Walden and his gallery and book store Der Sturm, e.g. Italian Futurists. In Berlin, Murayama had the occasion to pick up the latest developments in the visual arts, in music, performance and theater. Murayama was deeply impressed by German dancer Niddy Impekoven, who was celebrated as a prodigy in the 1920s. In May 1922, together with Wadachi and Nagano, Murayama travelled to Düsseldorf to participate at the First International Art Exhibition and the International Congress of Progressive Artists, both organized by the artist association Young Rhineland.

Initially drawn to the genre of Constructivism as typified by the work of Wassily Kandinsky, he later became dissatisfied with the detachment of Constructivism from reality and developed his own style by using a collage of real objects to provoke concrete associations. He coined this method 'conscious constructivism', which was known as MAVO. The "Mavoists" sought to eliminate the boundaries between art and daily life and rebelled against convention by combining industrial products with painting or printmaking in a collage. Protests against social injustice were portrayed by use of theatrical eroticism, which also mocked public morality.

== Literary career ==
As part of his efforts to bring art into everyday reality, Murayama and others helped design the Aoikan movie theater in Akasaka, Tokyo. He occasionally designed the cover of the theater's pamphlets.

On his return to Japan in 1923, Murayama introduced both expressionist and constructivist art, but was drawn more toward the modern theater, especially the proletarian theater movement of the 1920s. He applied many of the same techniques and aesthetic modes from his paintings into the realm of drama, including elements from German expressionism, Dadaism, futurism and other avant-garde European movements. He wrote and produced Marxist-inspired versions of Robin Hood and Don Quixote, which reflect his thinking that entertainment should play a vital sociopolitical objective. He painted illustrations for Rip Van Winkle, William Tell and more books. In addition to European stories, he drew illustrations for the Japanese picture book New Friend and more. When Tomoyoshi painted illustrations, he used his pen name Tom, which is the shortened version of his name, Tomoyoshi.

== Pre-war period ==
Murayama Tomoyoshi was one of the central figures of the left-wing theater. Through his time in Germany from 1922 to 1923, he felt contemporary Japanese performance was weak. At this time in the several countries especially the United States, Catherine the Great's life was a common subject used in plays and movies. None of the plays and movies produced before him expressed his concerns of society and politics of the time. In 1927, Murayama wrote Suka-to o Haita Nero ("Nero in a Skirt"), depicting Catherine II of Russia behaving callously towards her troops and peasants, and cruelty towards her lover to try to intercede on their behalf. It is claimed that puppets were intended to be used instead of actors, although for the opening of his play he used actors. Japanese government censors interpreted the play as a criticism of the Japanese imperial house and banned its performance.

In 1929, Murayama again greatly alarmed the authorities by producing Borokudanki ("Record of a Gang of Thugs"), a drama glorifying a 1923 incident on the Jingguang railway in China, where Chinese communist labor union leaders incited their disgruntled workers to riot, and in the ensuing mob violence, murdered the railway managers and sabotaged the equipment before being violently suppressed by the military. At the end of the play, the workers make defiant statements condemning militarism and imperialism, and hail the formation of workers communes.

In May 1930, Murayama was arrested on a violation of the Peace Preservation Laws and was released in December. In May 1931, he joined the Japanese Communist Party. This led to his arrest again in April 1932 in the middle of a dress rehearsal. He was only released on probation in March 1934 after recanting his political views and agreeing to disperse his theatrical company. In May, he published a novel, Byakuya ("White Night"), serialized in the literary magazine Chūōkōron. However, he soon returned to the theater, producing a dramatization of Shimazaki Toson's Yoake no mae ("Before the Dawn") in November 1934. He quickly followed this with numerous other works over the next couple of years, including efforts to revitalize the genre of shimpa and to produce new forms of kabuki. Murayama was known for his outspokenness against Japanese militarism and against censorship, which again drew official wrath. He was again arrested in August 1940, released on bail in June 1942, and re-sentenced in 1944. In 1945, while released on probation, he went to Korea, and in July 1945, he went to Manchukuo.

== Post-war period ==
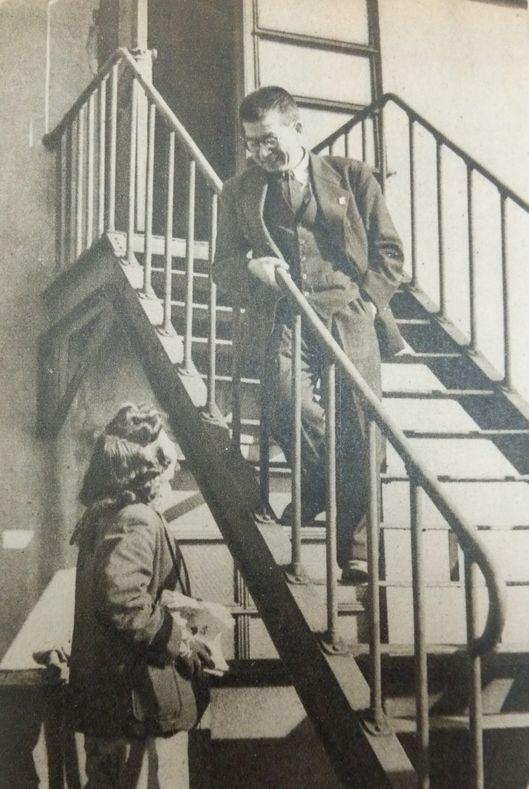
Murayama Tomoyoshi in 1948

In December 1945, after the end of World War II, Murayama returned to Japan. In February 1946, he formed a new theatrical company. However, the company was rent by politics, internal dissension and police issues with the Communist sympathies of a number of its members. In 1959, Murayama restructured it into the Tokyo Art Troupe, which he led overseas on a tour of China and Korea in 1960 and 1966. Murayama also participated in the formation of the Japan Democratic Literature Alliance in 1965, serving as its vice chairman for several years. In his later years, he devoted his energies to publishing compilation of plays, writing an autobiography and continuing to fight for intellectual freedom.

== See also ==
- Japanese literature
- List of Japanese writers
