= List of painters by name beginning with "M" =

Please add names of notable painters with a Wikipedia page, in precise English alphabetical order, using U.S. spelling conventions. Country and regional names refer to where painters worked for long periods, not to personal allegiances. The information on each entry is referenced on its page. There is no reason in principle why the reference it should not appear here as well.

- Ma Lin (馬麟, c. 1180 – post-1256), Chinese court painter
- Ma Shi (馬軾, c. 14th century), Chinese painter and poet
- Ma Quan (馬荃, late 17th/18th century), Chinese painter
- Ma Wan (馬琬, c. early 13th century), Chinese painter, calligrapher and poet
- Ma Yuan (馬遠, 1160/1165–1225), Chinese painter
- Ma Yuanyu (馬元馭, 1669–1722), Chinese painter
- Manabu Mabe (1924–1997), Japanese/Brazilian painter
- Robert Walker Macbeth (1848–1910), Scottish/British painter, etcher and watercolorist
- Henry Macbeth-Raeburn (1860–1947), Scottish painter and printmaker
- Robert MacBryde (1813–1866), Scottish/English painter and set designer
- Dugald Sutherland MacColl (1859–1948), Scottish/English painter, critic and writer
- Frances MacDonald (1873–1921), Scottish artist and designer
- Frances Macdonald (1914–2002), English painter
- Hamish MacDonald (1935–2008), Scottish painter
- Stanton Macdonald-Wright (1890–1973), American painter
- James Pittendrigh MacGillivray (1856–1938), Scottish sculptor, musician and poet
- William York Macgregor (1855–1923), Scottish painter
- Joe Machine (born 1973), English artist, poet and writer
- August Macke (1887–1914), German painter
- Esther Blaikie MacKinnon (1885–1934), Scottish painter and engraver
- Charles Rennie Mackintosh (1868–1928), Scottish architect, designer and water-colorist
- Margaret Macdonald Mackintosh (1864–1933), Scottish artist and designer
- Daniel Maclise (1806–1870), Irish/English painter and illustrator
- Chica Macnab (1889–1981), Scottish painter and engraver
- Herbert MacNair (1868–1955), Scottish artist, designer and teacher
- Nicolette Macnamara (1911–1987), English painter and author
- Elizabeth MacNicol (1869–1904), Scottish painter
- William MacTaggart (1903–1981), Scottish painter
- Viktor Madarász (1840–1917), Hungarian painter
- Conroy Maddox (1912–2005), English painter, collagist and lecturer
- Carlo Maderna (1556–1629), Italian architect
- Maeda Masao (前田政雄, 1904–1974), Japanese woodblock printer
- Maeda Seison (前田青邨, 1885–1977), Japanese nihonga painter
- Nicolaes Maes (1634–1693), Dutch painter
- John Maggs (1819–1896), English painter
- René Magritte (1898–1967), Belgian artist
- Charles Mahoney (1903–1968), English muralist and teacher
- Aristide Maillol (1861–1944), French sculptor, painter and print-maker
- Theodore Major (1908–1999), English artist
- Hans Makart (1840–1884), Austrian painter, designer and decorator
- Americo Makk (1927–2015), Hungarian/American painter
- Maki Haku (巻白, 1924–2000), Japanese artist
- Konstantin Makovsky (1839–1915), Russian painter
- Vladimir Makovsky (1846–1920), Russian painter, art collector and teacher
- Tadeusz Makowski (1882–1932), Polish/French painter
- Kees Maks (1876–1967), Dutch painter
- Jacek Malczewski (1858–1929), Polish painter
- Estuardo Maldonado (born 1930), Ecuadorian sculptor and painter
- Fredy Malec Koschitz(1914–2001),Slovenian painter and woodcarver
- Władysław Malecki (1836–1900), Polish painter
- Kazimir Malevich (1878–1935), Russian artist and art theorist
- Anita Malfatti (1889–1964), Brazilian artist
- José Malhoa (1855–1933), Portuguese painter
- Maruja Mallo (1902–1995), Spanish painter
- Jean Malouel (1365–1415), Dutch/Burgundian court painter
- Teobaldo Nina Mamani (born 1968), Peruvian painter and art professor
- Cornelis de Man (1621–1706), Dutch painter
- Man Ray (1890–1976), American/French visual artist
- Edna Mann (1926–1985), English painter
- Harrington Mann (1864–1937), Scottish artist and decorative painter
- Johan Edvard Mandelberg (1736–1786), Swedish/Danish painter
- Karel van Mander (1548–1606), Flemish painter, poet and art theorist
- Josef Mánes (1820–1871) Austro-Hungarian (Czech) painter
- Alfred Manessier (1911–1993) French painter and stained-glass and tapestry designer
- Édouard Manet (1832–1883), French painter
- Miltos Manetas (born 1964), Greek/Colombian painter and multimedia artist
- Joe Mangrum (born 1969), American installation and multimedia artist
- Jim Manley (born 1934), English/Northern Irish artist
- Alexander Mann (1853–1908), Scottish painter
- Totte Mannes (born 1933), Finnish/Spanish visual artist
- Paul Howard Manship (1885–1966), American sculptor
- George Manson (1850–1876), Scottish water-colorist
- James Bolivar Manson (1879–1945), English artist and Tate Gallery Director
- Andrea Mantegna (c. 1431 – 1506), Italian painter
- Niklaus Manuel (1484–1530), Swiss artist, writer and politician
- Adam Manyoki (1673–1756), Hungarian painter
- Julius Edvard Marak (1832–1899), Austro-Hungarian (Czech) painter and graphic designer
- Franz Marc (1880–1916), German painter and print-maker
- Conrad Marca-Relli (1913–2000), American artist
- Louis Marcoussis (1883–1941), Polish/French painter and engraver
- Adam Marczyński (1908–1985), Polish painter
- Brice Marden (1938–2023), American artist
- Ödön Márffy (1878–1959), Hungarian painter
- De Hirsh Margules (1899–1965), American painter
- Carlos Francisco Chang Marín (1922–2012), Panamanian artist, musician and activist
- John Marin (1870–1953), American artist
- Jacob Maris (1837–1899), Dutch painter
- Matthijs Maris (1839–1917), Dutch painter, etcher and lithographer
- Willem Maris (1844–1910), Dutch painter
- Yoshio Markino (牧野義雄, 1869–1956), Japanese painter and author
- Károly Markó the Elder (1793–1860), Hungarian/Italian painter
- Terry Marks (born 1960), American painter
- Simon Marmion (1425–1489), French/Burgundian panel painter and illuminator
- Jacques Maroger (1884–1962), French painter and Louvre Museum technical director
- Luděk Marold (1865–1898), Austro-Hungarian (Czech) painter and illustrator
- Albert Marquet (1875–1947), French painter
- Jacob Marrel (1614–1681), German/Dutch painter
- Luis Marsans (1930–2015), Spanish (Catalan) painter
- Nicholas Marsicano (1908–1991), American artist
- Wilhelm Marstrand (1810–1873), Danish painter and illustrator
- Agnes Martin (1912–2004), American painter
- Eugene J. Martin (1938–2005), American visual artist
- Fletcher Martin (1904–1979), American painter, illustrator and educator
- John Martin (1789–1854), American painter, engraver and illustrator
- Knox Martin (1923–2022), American painter, sculptor and muralist
- Carlo Martini (1908–1958), Italian painter and academician
- Ndoc Martini (1880–1916), Albanian painter
- Raúl Martínez (1927–1995), Cuban/American painter, photographer and graphic artist
- Johannes Martini (1866–1935), German painter and graphic artist
- Simone Martini (c. 1284 – 1344), Italian painter
- Andrey Yefimovich Martynov (1768–1826), Russian painter and engraver
- Maruyama Ōkyo (円山応挙, 1733–1795), Japanese artist
- Tommaso Masaccio (1401–1428), Italian painter
- Frans Masereel (1889–1971), Flemish painter and graphic artist
- Vicente Juan Masip (1507–1579), Spanish painter
- Stanisław Masłowski (1853–1926), Polish painter
- Masolino (c. 1383 – 1447), Italian painter
- Alice Mason (1904–1971), American painter
- Emily Mason (1932–2019), American painter and print-maker
- Frank Mason (1921–2009), American painter and teacher
- Master of Affligem (15th/16th c.), Netherlandish painter
- Master of Saint Giles (fl. c. 1500), French or Flemish painter
- Master of the Bambino Vispo (early 15th century), Italian painter
- Master of the Embroidered Foliage (fl. 1480–1510), Netherlandish painter(s)
- Master of the Legend of Saint Lucy (fl. 1480–1510), Netherlandish painter
- Jan Matejko (1838–1893), Polish painter
- Zsuzsa Máthé (born 1964), Hungarian painter
- Henri Matisse (1869–1954), French painter, print-maker and sculptor
- Matsui Fuyoko (松井冬子, born 1974) Japanese nihonga painter
- Matsumura Goshun (松村呉春, 1752–1811), Japanese painter
- Matsuno Chikanobu (松野親信, fl. 1720s), Japanese ukiyo-e painter
- Quentin Matsys (c. 1466 – 1530), Flemish painter
- Roberto Matta (1911–2002), Chilean painter
- Louisa Matthíasdóttir (1917–2000), Icelandic/American painter
- Jaakko Mattila (born 1976), Finnish painter
- Eszter Mattioni (1902–1993), Hungarian painter
- Karl Matzek (1890–1983), Yugoslav (Bosnian) painter
- Jeanne du Maurier (1911–1997), English artist
- Anton Mauve (1838–1888), Dutch painter
- Paul Mavrides (born 1945), American artist, performer and writer
- Peter Max (1937–2026), German/American artist
- Vassily Maximov (1844–1911), Russian painter
- John Maxwell (1905–1962), Scottish painter
- Richard Mayhew (1924–2024), American painter and arts educator
- The Mazeking (born 1968), American visual artist
- Peter McArdle (born 1965), English artist and gallery owner
- Charles McAuley (1910–1999), Irish painter
- James McBey (1883–1959), Scottish artist, etcher and WW1 war artist
- Colin McCahon (1919–1987), New Zealand artist
- Sheila McClean (1932–2016), Irish painter
- Daphne McClure (born 1930), English painter
- Mary McCrossan (1865–1934), English painter
- Frederick McCubbin (1855–1917), Australian artist and art teacher
- Horatio McCulloch (1805–1867), Scottish painter
- Mary McEvoy (1870–1941), English painter
- Rory McEwen (1932–1982), Scottish artist and musician
- Fanny McIan (c. 1814 – 1897), English painter
- R. R. McIan (1803–1856), Scottish/English painter and actor
- Frank McKelvey (1895–1974), Irish/Northern Irish painter
- John McLaughlin (1898–1976), American painter
- Bruce McLean (born 1944), Scottish sculptor, performance artist and painter
- William McTaggart (1835–1910), Scottish painter
- Lewis Henry Meakin (1850–1917), American artist
- Dimitre Manassiev Mehandjiysky (1915–1999), Bulgarian painter and designer
- Robert Medley (1905–1994), English artist and theater designer
- László Mednyánszky (1852–1919), Hungarian painter and philosopher
- Józef Mehoffer (1869–1946), Polish painter and decorative artist
- Howard Mehring (1931–1978), American painter
- Bernardino Mei (1612/1615–1676), Italian painter and engraver
- Mei Qing (梅清, c. 1623–1697), Japanese painter, calligrapher and poet
- Victor Meirelles (1832–1903), Brazilian painter
- Jean-Louis-Ernest Meissonier (1815–1891), French painter and sculptor
- Cor Melchers (1954–2015), Dutch painter
- Vadym Meller (1884–1962), Russian/Soviet painter, illustrator and architect
- Antoine Ignace Melling (1763–1831), Levantine/French painter, architect and voyager
- Arthur Melville (1858–1904), Scottish painter
- Hans Memling (c. 1435 – 1494), German/Netherlandish painter
- Milton Menasco (1890–1974), American painter and movie director
- Menez (1926–1995), Portuguese painter
- Bernard Meninsky (1891–1950), English artist, draftsman and teacher
- Barthélemy Menn (1815–1893), Swiss painter and draftsman
- Carlo Mense (1886–1965), German artist
- Adolph Menzel (1815–1905), German painter, draftsman and etcher
- Alexey Merinov (born 1959), Russian painter and cartoonist
- Betty Merken (living), American painter and print-maker
- Pál Szinyei Merse (1845–1920), Hungarian painter and educator
- Luc-Olivier Merson (1846–1920), French painter and illustrator
- Hans Mertens (1906–1944), German painter
- Arnold Mesches (1923–2016), American visual artist
- Hendrik Willem Mesdag (1831–1915), Dutch painter
- Jean Messagier (1920–1999), French painter, sculptor and poet
- Youri Messen-Jaschin (born 1941), Swiss artist and designer
- Ken Messer (1931–2018), British watercolourist and draftsman
- Antonello da Messina (c. 1430 – 1479), Italian painter
- Ludwig Mestler (1891–1959), Austrian/American painter
- Ivan Meštrović (1883–1962), Austro-Hungarian (Croatian)/Yugoslav sculptor, architect and writer
- Attila Meszlenyi (born 1954), Hungarian painter, ecologist and musician
- Géza Mészöly (1844–1887), Hungarian painter
- Willard Metcalf (1858–1925), American painter and instructor
- Gabriel Metsu (1629–1667), Dutch painter
- Jean Metzinger (1883–1956), French painter, critic and poet
- Johann Heinrich Meyer (1760–1832), Swiss/German painter and art writer
- Otto Meyer-Amden (1885–1933), Swiss painter and graphic artist
- Mi Fu (米芾, 1051–1107), Chinese painter, poet and calligrapher
- Miao Fu (繆輔, fl. early 15th century), Chinese imperial painter
- Peter Michael (born 1972), English painter
- Piotr Michałowski (1800–1855), Polish painter
- Henri Michaux (1899–1984), Belgian/French poet, writer and painter
- Michelangelo Buonarroti (1475–1564), Italian sculptor, painter and poet
- Leo Michelson (1887–1978), Latvian/French painter, print-maker and sculptor
- David Michie (1928–2015), Scottish artist
- Colin Middleton (1910–1983), Irish artist
- Eugeen Van Mieghem (1875–1930), Belgian painter and draftsman
- Jan Miel (1599–1663), Flemish painter and engraver
- Michiel Jansz. van Mierevelt (1567–1641), Dutch painter and draftsman
- Frans van Mieris the Elder (1635–1681), Dutch painter
- Frans van Mieris the Younger (1689–1763), Dutch painter
- Jan van Mieris (1660–1690), Dutch painter
- Willem van Mieris (1662–1747), Dutch painter
- Abraham Mignon (1640–1679), German/Dutch painter
- Daniël Mijtens (1590–1647), Dutch/English painter
- Jay Milder (born 1934), American painter
- Ksenia Milicevic (born 1942), French painter, architect and town planner
- John Everett Millais (1829–1896), English painter and illustrator
- Manolo Millares (1926–1972), Spanish painter
- William Miller (1796–1882), Scottish engraver and water-colorist
- Francis Davis Millet (1846–1912), American painter, sculptor and writer
- Jean-François Millet (1814–1875), French painter, draftsman and etcher
- Lisa Milroy (born 1959), Canadian/English painter
- Min Zhen (閔貞, 1730–1788), Chinese painter and seal carver
- Luis Miranda (1932–2016), Ecuadorian painter
- Joan Miró (1893–1983), Spanish painter, sculptor and ceramicist
- Augustyn Mirys (1700–1790), Polish painter
- Fred Mitchell, (1923–2013), American artist
- Stanley Matthew Mitruk (1922–2006), American artist
- Miyagawa Chōshun (宮川長春, 1683–1753), Japanese ukiyo-e painter
- Miyagawa Isshō (宮川一笑, 1689–1780), Japanese ukiyo-e painter
- Miyagawa Shunsui (宮川春水, fl. c. 1740s–1760s), Japanese ukiyo-e painter and print-maker
- Tracey Moberly (born 1964), Welsh/English artist, author and radio host
- Amedeo Modigliani (1884–1920), Italian/French painter and sculptor
- Claes Corneliszoon Moeyaert (1592–1655), Dutch painter
- László Moholy-Nagy (1895–1946), Hungarian painter, photographer and professor
- Jan Miense Molenaer (1610–1668), Dutch painter
- Špelca Mladič (1894–1981), Slovenian painter and designer
- Luis Molinari (1929–1994), Ecuadorian artist and innovator
- Anton Möller (1563–1611), German painter and draftsman
- Sylvia Molloy (1914–2008) English/South African artist and teacher
- Joos de Momper (1564–1635), Flemish painter
- Piet Mondrian (1872–1944), Dutch painter and theorist
- Blanche Hoschedé Monet (1865–1947), French painter
- Claude Monet (1840–1926), French painter
- Paul Monnier (1907–1982), Swiss painter
- Eugene Montgomery (1905–2001), American painter and illustrator
- Albert Joseph Moore (1841–1893), English painter
- Frank Montague Moore (1877–1967), English/American painter and museum director
- Mona Moore (1917–2000), English painter and illustrator
- Otto Morach (1887–1973), Swiss painter and poster artist
- Rodolfo Morales (1925–2001), Mexican painter
- Thomas Moran (1837–1926), American painter and print-maker
- Giorgio Morandi (1890–1964), Italian painter and print-maker
- Jacob More (1740–1793), Scottish/Italian painter
- Gustave Moreau (1826–1898), French painter
- Paulus Moreelse (1571–1638), Dutch painter
- Ernest Morgan (1881–1954), Welsh architect and painter
- Harry Morley (1881–1943), English painter and engraver
- Camilo Mori (1896–1973), Chilean painter
- Mori Sosen (森狙仙, 1747–1821), Japanese painter
- Yoshitoshi Mori (森義利, 1898–1992), Japanese kappazuri stencil printer
- Berthe Morisot (1841–1895), French painter
- Malcolm Morley (1931–2018), English/American artist
- Sergio Rossetti Morosini (born 1953), Brazilian-American painter, sculptor and author
- Carey Morris (1922–1968), Welsh/English painter, illustrator and author
- Carl Morris (1911–1993), American painter
- James Morris (1908–1989), Welsh/English World War II artist
- Terry Morris (born 1965), Welsh artist and photographer
- George Morrison (1919–2000), American painter and sculptor
- James Morrison (1932–2020), Scottish painter
- John Lowrie Morrison (born 1948), Scottish painter
- Alberto Morrocco (1917–1998), Scottish painter and teacher
- Samuel F. B. Morse (1791–1872), American inventor and painter
- Richard Mortensen (1910–1993), Danish painter
- Thomas Corsan Morton (1859–1928), Scottish painter and Keeper of the Scottish National Gallery
- William H. Mosby (1898–1964), American artist and teacher
- Jill Moser (born 1956), American painter
- Mary Moser (1744–1819), English painter
- Colin Moss (1914–2005), English artist, teacher and World War II camouflage designer
- John Mossman (1817–1890), English/Scottish sculptor
- William Mossman (1793–1851), Scottish sculptor
- Robert Motherwell (1915–1991), American painter and print-maker
- Frederik de Moucheron (1633–1686), Dutch painter
- Didier Mouron (born 1958), Swiss/Canadian artist
- Charles Mozley (1914–1991), English painter and illustrator
- Ivan Mrkvička (1856–1938), Austro-Hungarian (Czech)/Bulgarian painter
- Master MS (fl. 16th century), Hungarian or German painter
- Muqi (c. 1201 – c. 1269), Chinese painter and monk
- Alphonse Mucha (1860–1939), Austro-Hungarian (Czech)/French painter, illustrator and graphic artist
- Georg Muche (1895–1987), German artist, architect and teacher
- Olive Mudie-Cooke (1890–1925), English painter
- Muggur (1891–1924), Icelandic painter, graphic artist and actor
- Pieter Mulier the Elder (1610–1670), Dutch painter
- Pieter Mulier II (1637–1701), Dutch/Italian painter
- Sheila Mullen (born 1942), Scottish painter
- Jan Müller (1922–1958), American artist
- Maler Müller (1749–1825), German painter, poet and dramatist
- Morten Müller (1828–1911), Norwegian painter
- Adolfo Müller-Ury (1862–1947), Swiss/American painter
- Munakata Shikō (棟方志功, 1903–1975), Japanese woodblock print-maker
- Edvard Munch (1863–1944), Norwegian painter
- Gustaf Munch-Petersen (1912–1938), Danish writer and painter
- Loren Munk (born 1951), American painter, draftsman and mosaic artist
- Mihály Munkácsy (1844–1900), Hungarian painter
- Sir Alfred Munnings (1875–1959), English painter
- Glòria Muñoz (born 1949), Spanish painter and art professor
- Gabriele Münter (1877–1962), German painter
- Muqi (牧谿, c. 1210 c. –1269), Chinese painter and monk
- Kagaku Murakami (村上華岳, 1888–1939), Japanese painter and illustrator
- Takashi Murakami (born 1963), Japanese painter, sculptor and merchandise artist
- John Murdoch (born 1971), American painter and art teacher
- Bartolomé Esteban Murillo (1617–1682), Spanish painter
- Dr. Atl (1875–1964), Mexican painter and writer
- Elizabeth Murray (1940–2007), American painter, print-maker and draftsman
- Edo Murtić (1921–2005), Danish painter and writer
- Italo Mus (1892–1967), American painter, draftsman and mosaic artist
- Saneatsu Mushanokōji (武者小路実篤, 1885–1976), Japanese artist, novelist and philosopher
- Zoran Mušič (1909–2005), Yugoslav/Slovenian painter, print-maker and draftsman
- Michiel van Musscher (1645–1705), Dutch painter
- Girolamo Muziano (1532–1592), Italian painter
- Grigoriy Myasoyedov (1834–1911), Russian painter
- Johannes Mytens (1614–1670), Dutch painter
- Caroline Mytinger (1897–1980), American painter
