= John Murdoch =

John Murdoch may refer to:

- John Murdoch (teacher) (1747–1824), friend and tutor to Robert Burns
- John Smith Murdoch (1862–1945), chief architect of the Commonwealth of Australia
- John Murdoch (athlete) (1885–1939), Canadian Olympic athlete
- John Murdoch (bishop) (1796–1865), Roman Catholic Vicar Apostolic for Western Scotland
- John Murdoch (editor) (1818–1903), Scottish newspaper editor and land reformer
- John Murdoch (footballer) (1901–1964), Scottish international footballer
- John Murdoch (politician) (1882–1936), Australian politician for the Electoral division of Pembroke
- John Murdoch (literary evangelist) (1819–1904), Christian missionary in Ceylon and India
- John E. Murdoch (1927–2010), American academic in the field of historical science
- John Murdoch (artist) (born 1971), American artist of realism, classical atelier
- John Murdoch of Rosebank (1709–1776), Scottish tobacco lord and three times Lord Provost of Glasgow
- The main character in the 1998 sci-fi film Dark City

== See also ==
- Bradley John Murdoch (1958–2025), Australian criminal
- John Murdock (disambiguation)
