= Jim Manley (artist) =

Jim Manley is an artist, born on 17 January 1934, in St Helens, Lancashire, England. He has lived in Killough, County Down, Northern Ireland since 1971. He uses mixed media (mainly water colours and acrylic).

== Selected exhibitions - Jim Manley ==
- 1976 Arts Council Gallery, Belfast
- 1978 Davis Gallery, Dublin
- 1979/80 Bell Gallery, Belfast
- 1982/84 Lincoln Gallery, Dublin
- 1985 Fenderesky Gallery, Belfast
- 1986 Hendricks Gallery, Dublin
- 1989/91 Solomon Gallery, Dublin
- 1992/94/97/99 Duncan Campbell, London
- 1992/93 The coast of Co. Down, Downpatrick, Sligo, Cavan, Armagh
- 1993 Bluecoat Chambers, Liverpool
- 1995 Basement Gallery, Dundalk
- 1996 Dyehouse Gallery, Waterford
- 1997 Blackcombe Gallery, Cork
- 1997 Ayesha Castle, Killiney
- 1998 Wolfson College, Oxford
- 1998 Croatian Embassy, London
- 2000 Dyehouse Gallery, Waterford
- 2000 Bluecoat Chambers Gallery, Liverpool
- 2001/3 Duncan Campbell, London
- 2004 Origin Gallery, Dublin
- 2003 Linen Hall Library, Belfast
- 2004 Origins Gallery, Dublin
- 2004 Cill Rallaig, County Kerry
- 2005 Tom Caldwell Gallery, Belfast
- 2008 The Yard Gallery, Portaferry
- 2010 Castle Espie, Comber, County Down
- 2010 Caldwell Gallery Belfast

== Selected exhibitions - various artists ==
- 1980/99 Royal Ulster Academy (RUA)
- 1988 Ulster Way - Galleries throughout Ireland
- 1989 The Mournes, Narrow Water Gallery, Warrenpoint
- 1990 Young EVA, Limerick
- 1991 Paradise Island, Bluecoat Chambers, Liverpool
- 1991/99 IONTAS, Sligo
- 1994 Watercolours at the Walker, Liverpool
- 1995 Blian is Fice as Fag, Sligi
- 1997 Honouring Colmcille, Donegal/Edinburgh
- 2003 Exhibition of the Sea, Leith, Edinburgh
- 2004 IONTAS, Sligo
- 2007 Sunday Times Watercolour Exhibition

== Awards ==
- 1979 McGonigal Prize, Oireachtas
- 1984 Paton's Prize, EVA
- 1997 Landscape Prize, RUA
- 1997 Elmwood Gallery, Smallworks
- 1999 Painting Prize, IONTAS
- 2005 Ross's Watercolour Prize, RUA

== Watercolours purchased by public collections ==
- Conrad Hotel - Dublin
- UTV - Belfast
- Stormont Castle - Belfast
- Abbott Hall - Kendal
- Walker Art Gallery- Liverpool
- Bank of Ireland - Dublin
- Allied Irish Bank International
- Arts Council of Northern Ireland
- Down County Museum

== Watercolours purchased by private collections ==
- His Excellency the Croatian Ambassador - Dubrovnik
- Seamus Heaney
- Stephen Rea
- Dean Sullivan
- Lady Lea Leigh
- the late Colin Middleton

== See also ==
- List of Northern Irish artists
