= Eliza Mary Burgess =

British artist

- Born: 2 March 1878; Walthamstow, London
- Died: 1961 (aged 82–83)
- Education: Royal Female School of Art
- Known for: Painting

Eliza Mary Burgess (2 March 1878 – 1961) was a British artist, known as a painter and designer.

== Biography ==
Burgess was born and grew up in the Walthamstow area of London, where her father was a florist and gardener and her mother was a dressmaker. In 1897 she won a scholarship to the Royal Female School of Art where she won national prizes in several categories and at least three further scholarships. After graduation, Burgess remained working in London until she moved to Bristol in the 1950s and later lived in Scotland for a time. As an artist she created watercolour and tempura paintings of flowers and gardens, child portraits and miniatures.

Between 1900 and 1951, Burgess was a regular exhibitor at both the Royal Academy and with the Society of Women Artists, showing a total of 45 works with the latter. She was also a frequent exhibitor with the Royal Scottish Academy between 1920 and 1943 and also showed paintings with the Royal West of England Academy, of which she was an Associate member. She was also a member of the Royal Miniature Society. Internationally, works by Burgess were shown at the Paris Salon and in the United States, Canada and Australia. The Walker Art Gallery in Liverpool, Graves Art Gallery in Sheffield and the Victoria and Albert Museum in London hold examples of her work.
