= Jack Murdock =

Jack Murdock may refer to:

- Jack Murdock (basketball) (born 1934), American head basketball coach at Wake Forest
- Jack Murdock (actor) (1922–2001), American actor
- Jack Murdock (American football) (1930-2007), American football coach
- Jack Murdock (character), the father of Marvel Comics' Superhero Daredevil.
- Melvin Jack Murdock, American businessman, co-founder of Tektronix

== See also ==
- John Murdock (disambiguation)
