= John Murdock =

John Murdock may refer to:

- John R. Murdock (politician) (1885–1972), U.S. Representative from Arizona
- John Murdock (Mormon) (1792–1871), early missionary for The Church of Jesus Christ of Latter-day Saints
- John R. Murdock (Mormon) (1826–1913), his son, Latter-day Saints leader
- John S. Murdock (1871–1946), Rhode Island Supreme Court judge

== See also ==
- Jack Murdock (disambiguation)
- John Murdoch (disambiguation)
