= R. R. McIan =

Scottish actor and painter (1803–1856)

RR McIan
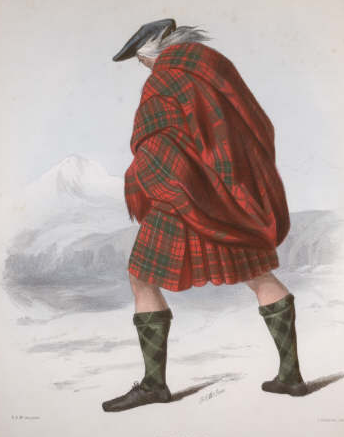
- Born: 1803; Scotland
- Died: 13 December 1856 (aged 52–53); Hampstead
- Known for: Painting
- Notable work: Scottish clan paintings
- Movement: Romanticism
- Awards: Associate of the RSA

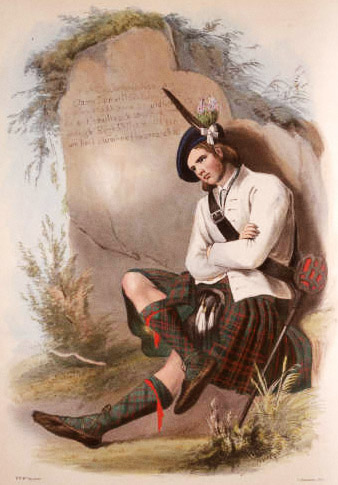
A MacDonald of Glencoe (McIan), from The Clans of the Scottish Highlands (1845).

Robert Ronald McIan (1803 – 13 December 1856), also Robert Ranald McIan, was a Scottish actor and painter. He is best known for romanticised depictions of Scottish clansmen, their battles and domestic life.

His wife, Fanny McIan, was a painter and early teacher of art to women.

== Acting ==
McIan was born in Scotland, in 1803. He became an actor with the joint company of the Theatres Royal in Bristol and Bath before making his way to London. In 1838 he played at the Covent Garden Theatre and at Drury Lane in the following year. He gained a reputation for playing Highlanders on the stage, at a time when the novels of Sir Walter Scott had revived interest in Highland culture.

It's not clear when he gave up the stage to devote himself to painting. He played the jester in the Eglinton Tournament of 1839 and the 1885 DNB says he retired in that year. A letter from Charles Dickens mentions seeing McIan perform on 23 June 1841, not long before McIan's wife started a steady job as a teacher.

== Personal life ==
WP Frith described McIan as "a Highlander and fierce Jacobite", Henry Vizetelly wrote that he "was generally voted an intolerable bore".

McIan eloped with and married Frances (Fanny) Whitaker (c.1814–1897), daughter of a Bath cabinet maker. A friend described them as "The painter and his painter-wife – two who went hand in hand, and heart with heart, together through the world".

Mrs McIan was a noted painter in her own right, who exhibited at the Royal Academy and other leading galleries. She too favoured historical subjects from the Highlands, such as Highlander defending his Family at the Massacre of Glencoe. The Highlander in question would have been a MacDonald of Glencoe, also known as Clan McIan. From 1842 until Robert's death she was the first Superintendent of the Female School of Design, which became the Royal Female School of Art and ultimately part of the Central School of Arts and Crafts.

They moved to 9 Great Coram Street in 1843 and 36 Charlotte Street in 1849.

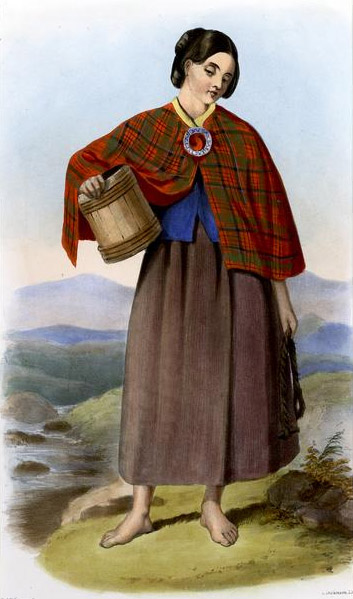
A member of Clan MacNeacail, from The Clans of the Scottish Highlands (1845).

== Painting ==
McIan learnt to paint whilst he was an actor, and submitted his first landscape to the Royal Academy in 1836. He exhibited in the Suffolk Street Gallery in 1835 and 1837 whilst acting at the newly rebuilt English Opera House. His 1838 portrait of novelist Anna Maria Hall (Mrs S.C. Hall) was praised by Camilla Toulmin.

He is perhaps best known for his illustrations in The Clans of The Scottish Highlands, published in 1845 on the centenary of the Jacobite Rising with text by James Logan. It proved so popular that it was reissued in 1857, after his death. His depictions of clansmen fanned the romantic revival of interest in Gaeldom that was led by Queen Victoria, to whom the book was dedicated.

McIan's early paintings concentrated on scenes from domestic life in the Highlands, such as illicit whisky stills and women grinding corn. These culminated in the 1848 sequel to the Clans book, entitled Gaelic Gatherings: Or The Highlanders at Home, on the Heath, the River and the Loch.

In later life his works increasingly took on overtly nationalistic subjects, celebrating the exploits of Highland soldiers against the English and overseas. Paintings of the 79th Cameron Highlanders were commissioned by Colonel Lauderdale Maule to celebrate the end of his ten-year colonelcy of the regiment in December 1852. An Incident in the Revolutionary War of America showed the 71st Fraser Highlanders' heroic defense at the Battle of Stono Ferry and was exhibited at the Royal Scottish Academy in 1854.

McIan was elected an associate of the Royal Scottish Academy in 1852 and died at Hampstead, north London, on 13 December 1856.

== Notes and references ==
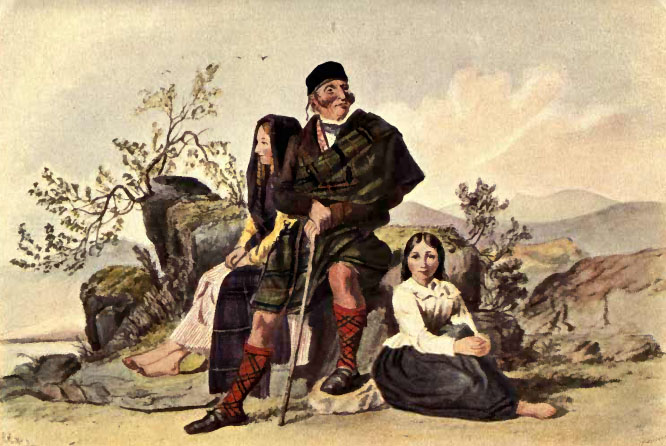
"Ewen Mac Phee the Outlaw". An illustration by R. R. McIan, originally appearing in his work: Gaelic gatherings, or the Highlanders at Home on heather, river and loch, published in 1848.
