= Evelyn Cheston =

British painter (1875–1929)

- Born: Evelyn Davy; 8 September 1875; Ranmoor, Sheffield, England
- Died: 31 October 1929 (aged 54); Musbury, Devon, England
- Education: Royal Female School of Art; Slade School of Art
- Known for: Painting
- Spouse: Charles Sidney Cheston (m.1904)

Evelyn Cheston née Davy (8 September 1875 – 31 October 1929) was a British painter in oils and watercolours of landscapes and outdoor scenes.

== Biography ==
Cheston was born in the Ranmoor suburb of Sheffield and attended the Royal Female School of Art in London from 1882 to 1894. From 1894 to 1899, she studied at the Slade School of Art, also in London, where, on one occasion, she shared a painting prize with Augustus John. Her winning entry remains in the collection of University College, London.

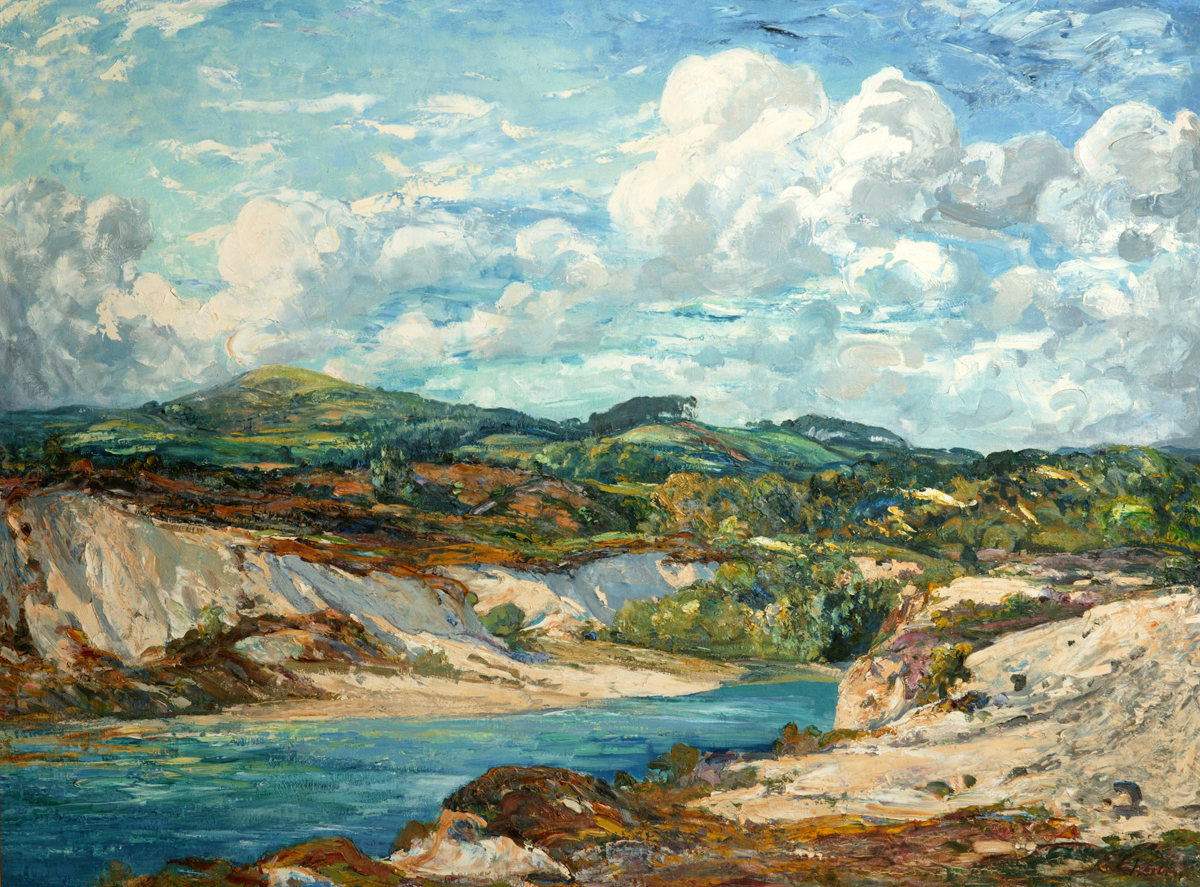
Creech Barrow in Dorset

Cheston spent some time at Walter Westley Russell's landscape classes in Yorkshire and there she met her future husband. In 1904 she married the artist Charles Sidney Cheston and the couple lived in Dorset, Devon and London at different times. While living at Studland in Dorset, the local coast, particularly Studland Bay became a regular subject of her paintings. Evelyn Cheston first exhibited with the New English Art Club in 1906 and became a member in 1909. She fell ill with Bright's disease which left her disabled but she continued to paint, often outdoors and usually in her signature vivid style. The impact the Impressionist works she had seen in Paris during 1912 and the influence of her Slade tutor, Philip Wilson Steer, were evident in her use of colour and light.

Cheston died in 1929, at Musbury near Axminster in Devon. Two years later her husband wrote Evelyn Cheston, an account of her career and a memoir of their life together which also highlighted instances of discrimination she had faced as a woman artist. Memorial exhibitions to her were held at the Royal Watercolour Society galleries in 1929 and at the Mappin Art Gallery in Sheffield in 1931. Her 1917 painting Betchworth Lane, October was purchased by the Tate in 1924 and remains in their collection.
