= Killiney Church =

- Nuns' Abbey
- Cill Iníon Léinín
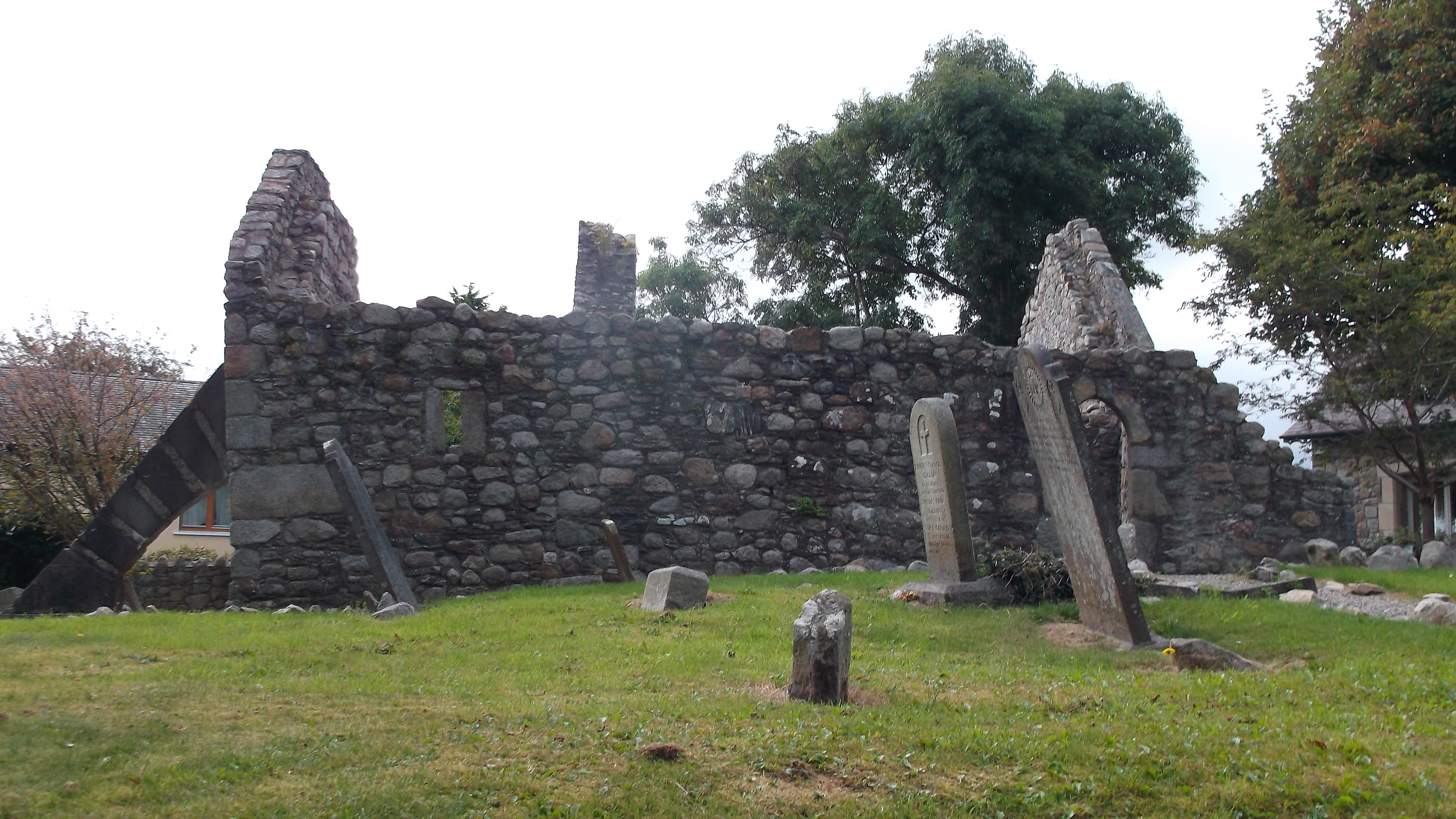

- Location within Dublin
- 53.25472°N 6.11631°W
- Location: Marino Avenue West, Killiney, Dún Laoghaire–Rathdown
- Country: Ireland
- Denomination: Pre-Reformation Catholic

History
- Founded: 11th century

Architecture
- Style: Norman
- Years built: 11th century

Specifications
- Length: 11.5 m (38 ft)
- Width: 9 m (30 ft)

Administration
- Diocese: Dublin

National monument of Ireland
- Official name: Killiney
- Reference no.: 35

Killiney Church is an ancient church in County Dublin, Ireland.

== Location ==
Killiney Church lies 240 m (790 ft) west of the coast, and 1.6 km (0.99 mi) south of Killiney Hill. In the modern day, this site is in the middle of housing developments, near Marino Avenue West.

== The building ==
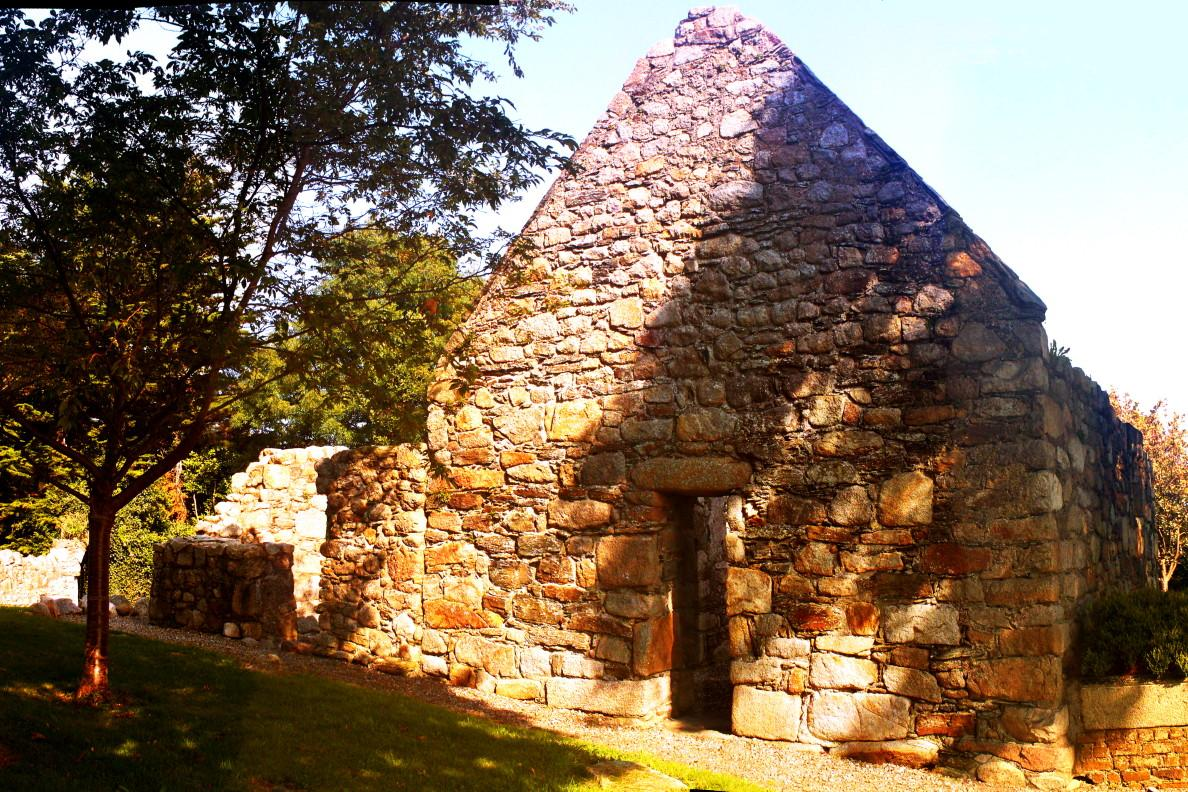
View of the entrance

A monastery stood on the site from the 6th–7th century. The name of the 6th century site was Cill Ingean Léinín ("Church of the Daughters of Léinín"). These were seven virgin sisters, Aiglenn, Macha, Luiden, Druiden, Luicill, Bimtach, and Briga; the last is also patron of Tully Church. Their brother was Colmán of Cloyne (Colmán mac Léníne; 530–606). Their festival was celebrated on 6 March.

The church was built in the 11th century.
