= Killiney Castle =

Manor house in County Dublin, Ireland

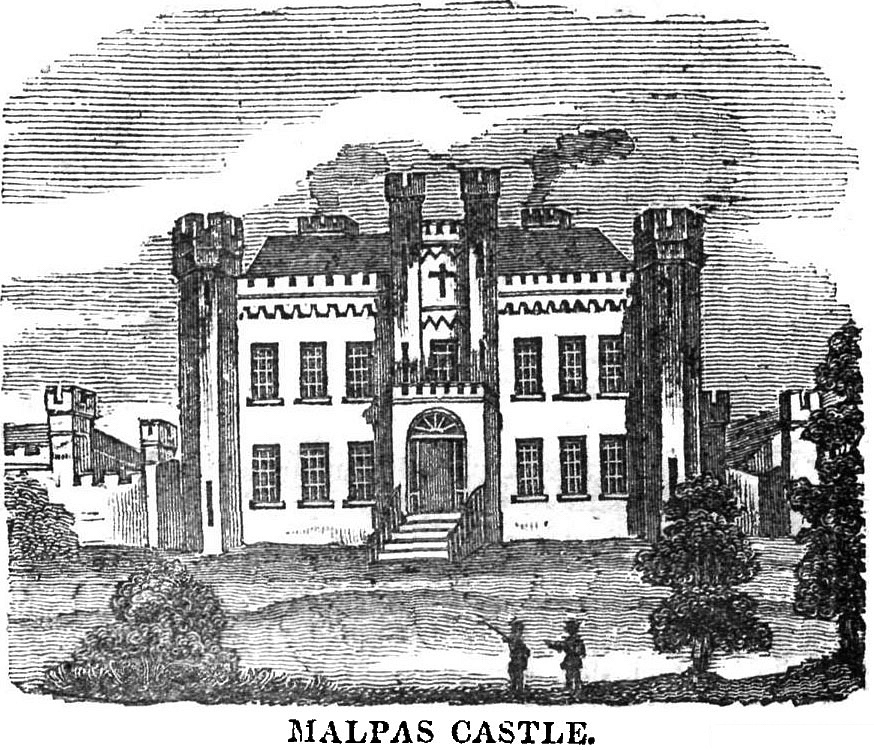
- 19th-century illustration, titled "Mount Malpas", from the Dublin Penny Journal (May 1835)
- Interactive map of the Killiney Castle area
- Alternative names: Mount Malpas, Rocksborough, Loftus Hill, Fitzpatrick Castle Hotel

General information
- Type: Castellated manor house
- Architectural style: Gothic revival
- Location: Killiney Hill Road, Killiney, County Dublin, Ireland
- Coordinates: 53.2693°N 6.1133°W
- Years built: c. 1740 (original Georgian house), c. 1840 (Gothic remodelling)

Design and construction
- Architect: Sandham Symes (1840s remodelling)
- Designations: Protected structure

Killiney Castle, also known as Mount Malpas, Rocksborough, or Loftus Hill, and now known as Fitzpatrick Castle Hotel, is an 18th-century manor house near Killiney in County Dublin, Ireland. The castle was converted into a hotel, which has been open since 1971.

== History ==
As of the 13th century, the lands on which Killiney Castle was later built, was reputedly under the control of the Talbots of Malahide.

=== 18th century development ===
Colonel John Malpas constructed Mount Malpas, now known as Killiney Castle, in 1740. An advertisement in Falkiner's Dublin Journal of 1752 suggests that Malpas may have rented the castle in its early years: "Roxborough, formerly called Mount Malpas, containing 150 acres of land enclosed by a stone wall and a new well-furnished house of six rooms and two large closets on a floor with offices". The original Mount Malpas was a Georgian mansion, with two-storeys over a basement.

By the mid-18th century the estate was known as "Loftus Hill" and associated with Henry Loftus (MP for Bannow in County Wexford and later Viscount of Ely). By the 1780s, the leaseholder was Humphrey Minchin.

=== Bourchier (1797-1834) ===
Early in the 1700s, Northamptonshire soldier Thomas Bouchier/Bourchier settled in County Tipperary. His descendants later intermarried with other Irish families. By the beginning of the 19th century, their primary home was Killiney Castle in County Dublin. A descendent of Thomas Bourchier, also known as Thomas Bourchier, was the Clerk of the Crown, Hanaper, and Usher of the Black Rod in the Irish House of Commons. He was a resident of Killiney Castle, and his relocation to the area may have coincided with his appointment as deputy clerk in July 1797. In the Tithe Applotment Book of 1826, the owner and occupier of "Mount Mapas" is listed as Thomas Bourcheir Esq. An entry in the Dublin Penny Journal, dated to August 1834, describes the main house as:

The residence of some foolish city Goth who has contrived to make a burlesque upon castellation by affixing certain indentures to the top of his house like the toothed deed by which he himself was bound over to an attorney or dealer; and with the accompaniments of slashes in the walls and things like mustard pots and pepper castors at the corners, has turned a good old plain country mansion into a Babel building, where all art is confounded, taste abused and there it stands like a fool upon a cock-horse; nonsense set upon a hill.

— Dublin Penny Journal, August 1834

=== Warren Era (1834-1872) ===
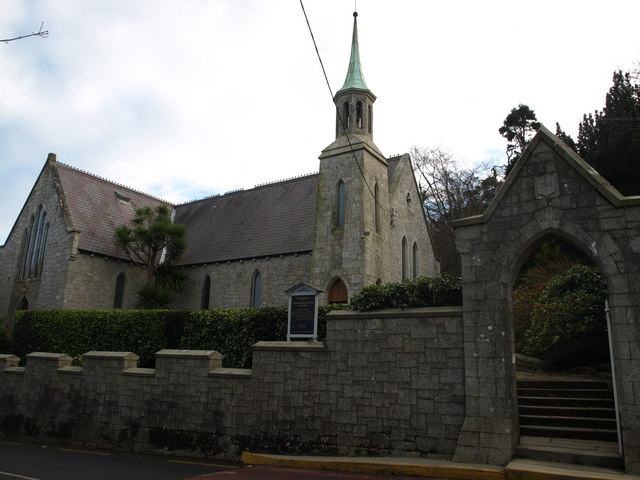
Holy Trinity Church was built on the demesne of Killiney House (castle) in 1848

By the mid-19th century, the estate was associated with Robert Warren, a solicitor and developer who had made a fortune selling land to the Dublin and Bray Railway. Warren's home, Killiney House, was renamed Killiney Castle after it was given crenellations. These works were completed c. 1840 and are attributed by several sources, including the Dictionary of Irish Architects, to Warren's relative, architect Sandham Symes. The works included the installation of castellations, fake medieval corner towers, turrets, battlements and a Gothic porch. A Church of Ireland church, dedicated to the Holy Trinity, was also built on the demesne in 1859.

Warren had influence with the railway company since he owned the coastal lands along the rail route from Dalkey to Bray and beyond. After some negotiation, a tunnel was built, allowing the line to open. As part of the agreement, Obelisk Hill Halt was built on Warren's land, increasing the value of his holdings and quickening the rate of local development.

By the early 1870s, a number of Warren's investments and development projects had failed and, in 1871, the Landed Estates Court obliged him to sell the Killiney land at auction to pay off related debts. Following the auction, in which Victoria Castle was purchased for £5,000-0-0 by Humphrey Lloyd, the provost of Trinity College at the time, Warren had enough money to pay off his main creditors. After he gave the court more than £11,000-0-0, the remaining properties were taken out of the auction. He remained in Killiney Castle, passing it to his son, Robert Warren (junior), by 1873.

=== Jesuit house ===
By the mid-1870s, the house had been purchased by the Jesuit Order in Ireland, for use as a "villa [holiday] house". The Jesuits occupied the house between 1877 and 1880.

=== Thomas Chippendall Higgin ===
Thomas Chippendall Higgin purchased the house around 1880. He built a half-octagonal castellated tower, a cut-stone doorway, and an entrance porch to the front of the castle. The door-case is in the style of the seventeenth century and has a carved plaque. Higgin was buried atop Dalkey Hill in 1906, where a broken cross is inscribed with the words "Dust thou art, to dust returneth, Was not spoken of the soul".

=== 20th century ===
The castle was used as a base by the Black and Tans in the Irish War of Independence (1919–1921) and by the Irish Republican Army (IRA) during the Irish Civil War (1922–1923). Subsequently burned and largely abandoned, the castle was reputedly used as a base, for the IRA's campaign of sabotage and bombings, in the 1930s. The building was requisitioned and used as billets for Irish Army during The Emergency (1939–1945).

Subsequently acquired by the Fitzpatrick family, the castle was converted and opened as a hotel in the early 1970s.

== Demesne ==
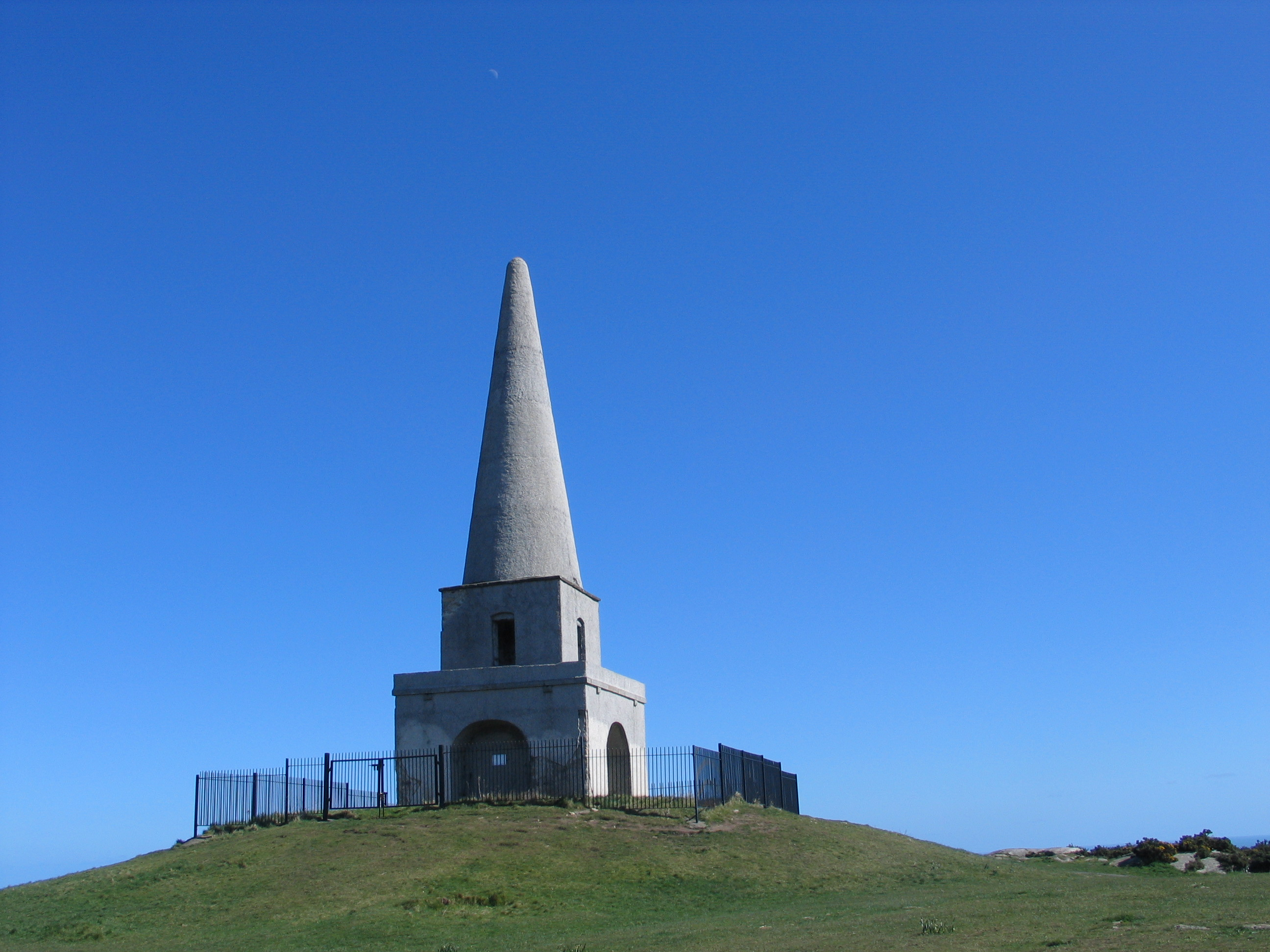
The obelisk on Killiney Hill has an inscription mentioning John Mapas (dated 1742) and a plaque marking its restoration by then estate owner Robert Warren (dated 1840)

At the time of its construction in the 18th century, the 150-acre Killiney Castle estate was surrounded by a stone wall, with the exception of the sea, "where nature had sufficiently enclosed them". Originally known as Mount Mapas, the surrounding demesne and gardens were planted with assortment of flowers and fruit trees.

According to Peter Wilson's Dublin Directory of 1768, Henry Loftus, undertook several enhancements to the home and gardens. Described as being "enclosed with high stone walls, stocked with the best fruit trees, and such a collection of flowers as must captivate the most insensible eye", Loftus reputedly laid a new carriage road around Killiney Hill, blasting rock outcrops and filling them in with earth, and planting a variety of trees and shrubs on the hill's west side. Wilson adds that although Loftus had planned to construct a banqueting house in the woods, he instead devoted his energies to works at Rathfarnham Castle.

Bourchier's Obelisk, within Killiney Hill Park, is listed in Dun Laoghaire Rathdown County Council's Record of Protected Structures. This may be the smaller obelisk (compared to the Killiney Hill Obelisk) mentioned in Francis Erlington Ball's History Of The County Dublin, in which it is reported that "in 1796 [..] a memorial was about to be placed on the hill, in pursuance of the will of the last Mr. Mapas, who left a large sum for the erection of a monument to his family". Thomas Bourchier (d.1832) seems to have completed this task.
