= Richard Schmid =

American painter (1934–2021)

- Born: October 5, 1934; Chicago, Illinois
- Died: April 18, 2021 (aged 86)
- Education: American Academy of Art
- Known for: Painting

Richard Schmid (October 5, 1934—April 18, 2021) was an American realist artist.

He was the author of Alla Prima, an influential art instruction book about his approach to the alla prima (wet-on-wet) oil painting technique.

== Early career ==
Richard Schmid's maternal grandfather, Julian Oates, was an architectural sculptor. Richard's initial studies in landscape painting, figure drawing, and anatomy began at the age of twelve and continued into classical techniques under William H. Mosby at the American Academy of Art in Chicago.

== Career ==
In 1964 Schmid was the focus of the film The Secret Squint, which was awarded the C.I.N.E. Award. In 1990 Schmid was a finalist for The Hubbard Art Award for Excellence. In 2000, Schmid received the John Singer Sargent Medal for Lifetime Achievement from the American Society of Portrait Artists; and in 2001, Schmid produced a short documentary film, An American Portrait: The Senator and the Artist, in which Schmid interviewed then Senator James Jeffords of Vermont, while simultaneously painting his portrait.

The retrospective show Richard Schmid - A Retrospective Exhibition was held at the Butler Institute of American Art in 2003. In May 2005, Schmid received the gold-medal award from The Portrait Society of America. Additional lifetimes awards Schmid has received include the Medal of Honor from the Salmagundi Club of New York City, the $100,000 overall winner award of 1987 Arts for the Parks Top 100 , from the National Park Academy of the Arts, Inc. and The American Watercolor Society Gold Medal. In 2003 he received an honorary doctorate degree from the Lyme Academy College of Fine Arts. His works are in the permanent collections of the Smithsonian Institution and other major museums. His large painting of Abbotsford House, the home of Scottish poet, novelist, and playwright Sir Walter Scott, was received by Queen Elizabeth II during ceremonies celebrating the reopening of the home in 2012. In 2014 Plein Air magazine, also presented Schmid with the Lifetime Achievement Award. Over his career, his work has been the focus of more than fifty solo exhibitions.

== Writing and recording ==
Schmid was the author of Alla Prima, Everything I Know About Painting, an art instruction book first published in 1998. Schmid has also videos and DVDs, some of which feature his personal art instruction in the areas of landscape painting and portrait painting.

== Personal life ==
Schmid lived in New Hampshire with his wife, artist Nancy Guzik.
