= John Murdoch (literary evangelist) =

Scottish Christian missionary

- Born: July 22, 1819; Glasgow
- Died: August 10, 1904 (aged 85); Madras
- Occupations: Christian missionary, writer

John Murdoch (July 22, 1819 - August 10, 1904) was a Scottish Christian missionary who served in Ceylon and India in the 19th century. Murdoch first journeyed to Ceylon in order to serve as a head-master of the schools located in Kandy, yet shortly after his arrival he resigned due to concerns with the state-mandated curriculum. Murdoch instead began to work with various Christian societies within the country producing Christian tracts. After a successful career with the Ceylon Tract Society, he became the Agent and Travelling Secretary in India for the Christian Vernacular Education Society, located in India, working with this mission for the rest of his career. He retired from full-time missionary work in 1903, yet continued to publish his written works on a variety of sources which included politics, religion, and sociology. He died in India after becoming weakened by pneumonia in 1904 having never married yet leaving behind a legacy in his written work.

== Early life ==
John Murdoch was born in Glasgow, Scotland, on 22 July 1819 to John and Margret Murdoch, the third in a family of twelve children. When he was ten years of age, Murdoch attended the Glasgow High School where he showed great aptitude in both the classics as well as in the field of art. Thus, in 1838, when he was only nineteen years of age, Murdoch left Glasgow and moved to Amsterdam with the intention of studying the classic works of art contained in the local galleries. Despite devoting himself to his artistic lifestyle he was unable to support himself by selling his paintings and was forced to return home to Glasgow.

== Career ==
=== As a teacher ===
It was at this point Murdoch decided to become an educator. To this end, he began to attend classes at the University of Glasgow as well as enrolling himself in the Glasgow Normal Seminary, a school established by David Stow which devoted itself entirely to training teachers. After completing his education he obtained a position as the assistant master, later promoted to headmaster, of the English Department of the Private Seminary for children of the wealthier class where he remained until the school was closed in 1842. At this time, Rev. William Fraser recommended Murdoch for appointment to the position of head-master of the Governmental Central and Normal Schools located in Kandy, Ceylon. Murdoch accepted the position and left Scotland on 13 March 1844 arriving in Ceylon on 17 August of the following year.

Once established, Murdoch poured himself into his work finding great enjoyment in it, as many of his letters home attested. Yet he found himself troubled by the fact that the government of Ceylon, as a crown colony, required him to teach the Bible as part of the curriculum despite the fact that the majority of his students were practicing Buddhists, Hindus and Muslims. In short, he was ill at ease being paid to teach Christian doctrine with revenues collected from these religious groups. In 1849, the Government of Ceylon, due to a bad crop of coffee, was forced to close down half of the Government Schools and drastically raise tuition in the remaining schools, resulting in a significant decline in the number of students. This situation, in combination with Murdoch's unease at using government schools to teach Christianity, was enough to cause him to resign his commission as of 1 October 1849.

=== Missionary ===
Once he had resigned as head-master, Murdoch devoted himself to an occupation which had previously been a nothing more than a hobby of his: tracts writing. While being previously employed as a teacher, Murdoch had bought a printing press and some Sinhalese type, and had begun to produce Sinhalese translations of various Christian tracts. Feeling the desire to continue full-time in this Christian missionary activity, Murdoch began working with the Sinhalese Tract Society writing tracts and visiting local Christian missionaries to better understand their needs. He worked in Ceylon for the next five years, writing and printing tracts and visiting local missionaries. While working with the Sinhalese Tract Society, Murdoch helped to produce "a considerable stock of tracts, some 20 school books, 6 maps, and several weighty volumes of Church History, Notes on the Bible, Jame's Anxious Inquirer . . . all in Sinhalese." As he traveled from one coffee plantation to the next, visiting with the English managers, he was convicted of the need to provide spiritual teaching for the Indian laborers. He therefore helped to form the Tamil Cooly Mission, an endeavor which placed him in contact with John Thomas, a missionary in Tirunelveli, India. This relationship meant that Murdoch was able to extend his network of missionary connections from Ceylon to India.

It was because of these Indian missionary connections that in 1858, Murdoch was invited to become the Agent and Travelling Secretary in India for the Christian Vernacular Education Society, a position which Murdoch accepted; in 1891 the name of the society would be shortened to The Christian Literature Society (CLS). The purpose of the society was primarily to provide inexpensive Christian literature for the newly literate Christians of India, yet they also concerned themselves with the education of school teachers and the inspection and improvement of the indigenous schools. Despite the fact that Murdoch worked for the CLS for the remainder of his career, he did not always agree with the other members in regards to protocol. When he was initially brought in to serve as the society's Agent, he had several disagreements with his coworkers in regards to funding and the qualifications necessary for the teachers who would be employed at the various institutions associated with the CLS. Despite these conflicts, Murdoch would remain with the CLS until his retirement in 1903.

Much of Murdoch's work for the society consisted of traveling throughout India inspecting various schools, and visiting with missionaries and society representatives. His travels took him outside of India, however, he made professional visits to Great Britain, the United States, various European countries and China, meeting with members of educational boards and practicing missionaries. His trip to China and Japan in 1882 and then again in 1891 proved most beneficial to his work as it enabled him to network the CLS with the newly formed Christian Literature Society for China. These trips also allowed him to network with powerful individuals outside of his normal sphere of influence such as Florence Nightingale, with whom he discussed issues of sanitation and health for the native population of India. She later praised his literary work, saying that his "little books are a great deal better then [sic] anything we could have done."

In addition to his work traveling throughout India visiting various missionaries and influential figures, Murdoch was involved in the organization of several missionary conferences. The most notable conference which Murdoch played a large part in forming was the first Decennial Missionary Conference held in 1872 at Allahabad. This conference was open to all the Protestant missionary societies of India and would become a regular reoccurring event, being held every ten years. Murdoch was one of three men given the task of compiling a report on the conference, but due to unforeseen circumstances, his two coworkers were unable to help with this task and the job of compiling the report felt completely to him. In addition to compiling the report, Murdoch also presented a paper on education and Christian literature. Later in his career, he also took part in the second and third Decennial Missionary Conferences as well as the first United Conference.

In 1867, the committee of the Religious Tract Society invited Murdoch to oversee their work in India in addition to his duties with the CLS, a position that Murdoch readily accepted as it enabled him to have direct access to every form of distribution of Christian literature in India. It was also during that time that the University of Glasgow, in appreciation of his work in spreading Christian literature throughout India, conferred upon him the honorary degree of LL.D on 9 February 1871.

=== Final years ===
During the final years of his life, Murdoch primarily busied himself with the work which had occupied much of his previous career, that of the inspection of the various projects that the CLS were overseeing in India. He also made several trips back to England with the intention of promoting the need for greater Christian literature in the various missionary ventures that were taking place during this time period. On 5 February 1903 Murdoch resigned the position of Agent and Secretary of the Madras Branch of the CLS to Henry Gulliford, desiring to spend more time producing Christian literature.

In 1896 Murdoch was bestowed the silver medal of the order Kaiser-i-Hindi by the Government of India due to his service to the Indian Empire. Eight years later a gold medal of the same order was bestowed upon him yet while he learned of this honor, he did not live to receive it. John Murdoch died on 10 August 1904 after being severely weakened by an attack of pneumonia the previous month. He died peacefully in a nursing home located in Madras, India the country where he had spent the past 60 years of his life writing and traveling.

== Writings ==
As the majority of his career was spent in the development of Christian literature, Murdoch is best remembered for his own literary works. He wrote primarily for educated Indians and as English is one of the primary languages of India, he wrote in his own native tongue. When he was associated with the CLS his writings were published under authorship of the society and as such he is best known for works which he wrote and published outside of their influence.

Murdoch took issue with the Theosophical lectures of Annie Besant which he believed were misguiding Hindus. He authored several books debunking the claims of the Theosophical Society, these were Theosophy Unveiled (1885), Theosophy Exposed (1893) and The Theosophic Craze (1894). He has been described as an "inveterate critic" of Theosophy.

One of his most notable works is Indian Missionary Manual: Hints to Young Missionaries to India, with Lists of Books which he wrote based upon his experiences traveling around India and visiting missionaries as part of his responsibilities as agent for the CLS. In it "he even presumed (rigid bachelor as he was) to give good advice to the ladies, of course, having profited by what he learned from experienced Missionary wives beforehand." He also diligently kept a journal throughout his life and various extracts of this account can be found in his bibliography as recorded in Henry Morris' The Life of John Murdoch LL.D.

One of the criticisms that has been leveled against Murdoch's literary work is that while he is correct in his assessment of the cultural situation of India, he was generally unflattering in his depiction of the Hindu faith, referring to them as 'dreamy' or 'speculative', in short, living in a way that was directly opposite to the busy, productive lifestyle that he himself lived and promoted.

== Publications ==
- Indian Missionary Manual: Hints to Young Missionaries to India, With Lists of Books (1864)
- Classified Catalogue of Tamil Printed Books (1865)
- Catalogue of the Christian Vernacular Literature of India (1870)
- Conference on Urdu and Hindi Christian literature, Held at Allahabad, 24 and 25 February (1875)
- Education in India: A Letter to His Excellency the Most Honourable, the Marquis of Ripon (1881)
- England’s Duty to India: A Letter to the Marquis of Hartington (1881)
- Theosophy Unveiled (1885)
- Theosophy Exposed: or Mrs. Besant and Her Guru: An Appeal to Educated Hindus (1893)
- The Theosophic Craze: Its History: The Great Mahatma Hoax (1894)
- Swami Vivekananda on Hinduism: An Examination of His Address at the Chicago Parliament of Religions (1895)
- Caste: Its Supposed Origin: Its History: Its Effects: The Duty of Government, Hindus, and Christians With Respect to It: And Its Prospects (1896)
- God's Voice from Armenia to the Churches (1896) [with Lewis Morris]
- Kasi, or Benares: The Holy City of the Hindus (1897)
- Report on Theological Education in India (1900)
- The History of Civilization in India: A Sketch, With Suggestions for the Improvement of the Country (1902)
- Hindu and Muhammadan Festivals (1904)
- Pictorial Tour Round India (1906)
