= Manderley Castle =

Castellated mansion near Dublin, Ireland

- Caisléan Mhanderley (Irish)
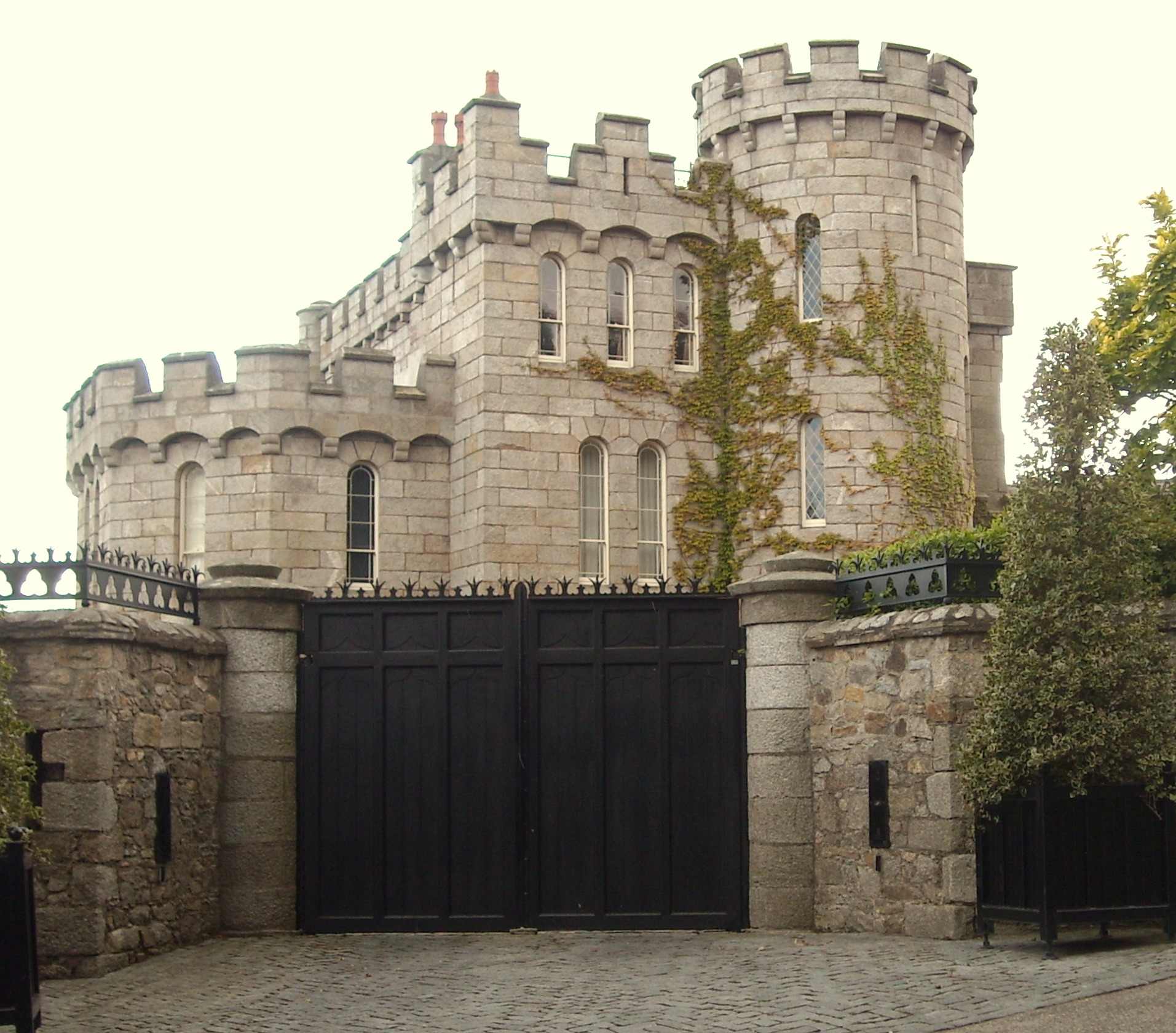
- View of Manderley Castle

- Location within Dublin

General information
- Status: Completed
- Location: Killiney, Ireland
- Coordinates: 53.2627°N 6.113°W
- Completed: 1840
- Owner: Enya

Technical details
- Grounds: 14,000 m2

Manderley Castle (Irish: Caisléan Mhanderley), formerly "Victoria Castle" and "Ayesha Castle," is a large castellated Irish mansion built in Victorian style, in Killiney, County Dublin, Ireland. It has been owned by the musician Enya since 1997.

== Features ==
From the roof of the crenellated turret of the castle, it is possible to see the Irish Sea. The building is surrounded by 14,000 m^{2} (3.5 acres) of gardens which had a number of woodland walks. A secret tunnel at the bottom of the garden originally gave access to Killiney beach but now is sealed off.

According to blueprints submitted in 1988, the owners sought permission to convert the existing stable house into attached living quarters. Permission was granted and the stable became an attached guest house, art room, exercise room and lounge area complete with staff quarters and a large loft. A tunnel running from the castle's basement to the Irish Sea was also marked for sealing in the blueprints.

According to the same submission, Manderley Castle sits at 1,300.336 m^{2} (13,996.70 ft^{2}) in combined floor space.

== History ==
Judge Robert Warren built Victoria Castle in 1840 to commemorate Queen Victoria's accession to the throne. The interior was gutted by fire in 1928, then restored by Sir Thomas Power of the whiskey distillery family. He renamed the mansion "Ayesha Castle", after the goddess who rose from the flames in H. Rider Haggard's novel She. In 1995, the Aylmer family decided to turn Ayesha Castle into a place of tourist interest, "conver[ting] existing stables to a ground floor apartment and a first floor craft room". The Stable Gallery was established there, and a number of artists displayed their pictures.

Irish musician Enya bought the castle in 1997 for €3.8 million (US$4.1 million), reportedly outbidding Michael Flatley, who also viewed the house. Based on her interest in Daphne du Maurier's Rebecca, Enya renamed the castle "Manderley" for the fictional house that plays a central role in the 1938 novel.

Enya stated in several interviews around 1998 (while out promoting Paint The Sky With Stars: The Best of Enya) that the castle had fallen into major disrepair and was in need of extensive remodeling.

=== Security ===
Because of threats from stalkers, Enya reinforced the security of the castle, installing new solid timber entrance gates, raising the surrounding 41 metres (135 ft) of stone wall to more than 2.7 metres (9 ft), and placing 1.2-metre (4 ft) railings atop some sections. Despite these changes, around mid-August 2005, there were two separate security breaches while Enya was at the castle (her security system includes a panic room).
