= Fanny McIan =

English artist

Fanny McIan (c. 1814 – 7 April 1897) was an English artist who specialized in Scottish historical scenes. As the first superintendent of London's Female School of Design, she promoted British women's art education in the mid-nineteenth century.

== Early life and education ==
Frances Matilda "Fanny" Whitaker was born in Bath, the daughter of William Whitaker and Sarah Hawkins. Her father was a cabinetmaker, and her mother worked as an upholsterer after she was widowed. The exact date of her birth is not known, but she was about sixteen years old when she eloped with actor and painter R. R. McIan in 1831.

== Career ==
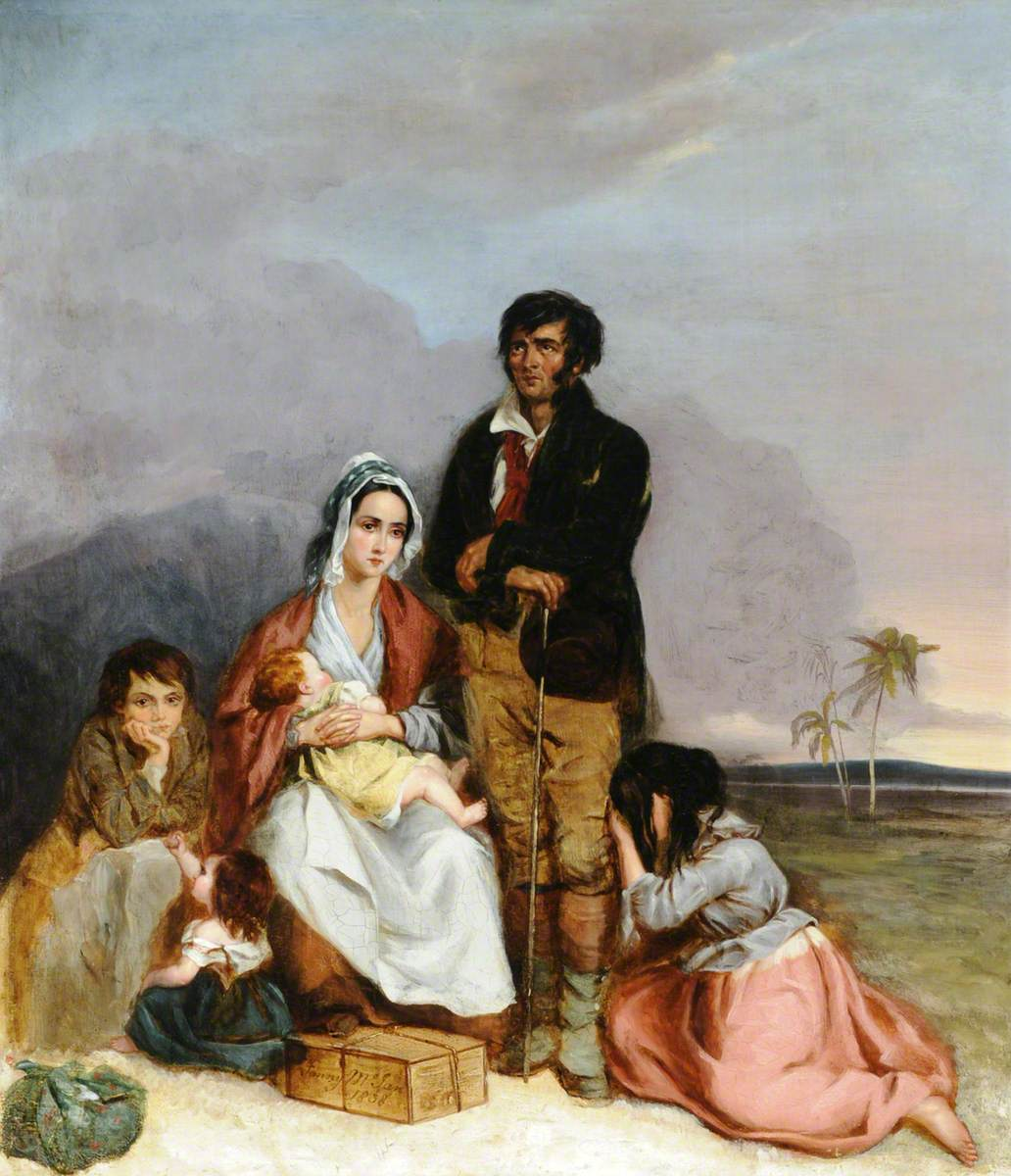
Exiles from Erin

Fanny McIan painted epic historical scenes and intimate domestic scenes. She had her first exhibit at the Royal Academy in 1836. Her sentimental prints such as "Exiles from Erin" (1838) proved especially popular. One of her private students was John Leech, who drew caricatures for Punch magazine.

Fanny McIan was the first superintendent of London's Female School of Design (later the Royal Female School of Art, which merged with the Central School of Arts and Crafts in 1908), which opened with government funding in 1842. The school was launched to train respectable young women in need of employment to be porcelain painters and otherwise enter industrial careers, but McIan's curriculum included more fine arts subjects (oil painting, wood engraving), and attracted comfortable middle-class students as well. She was particularly chastised for allowing women students to learn figure drawing from nude models. Charles Dickens was a correspondent of McIan's, and agreed with her complaints that the original building and its location were ill-suited for art education. The distance between the school's stated mission and McIan's practices led to her termination in 1857.

== Personal life ==
Fanny McIan was widowed in 1856. She remarried within a few years, to businessman Richard James Unwin. She was widowed a second time in 1864, and inherited a significant fortune, and property in Argyll. After her second marriage she did not exhibit her art in public. Fanny McIan died in 1897, in her eighties.
