= Teobaldo Nina Mamani =

Peruvian painter

Teobaldo Nina Mamani (born 1 July 1965) is a painter and teacher. Originally from Moquegua, Peru, Nina attended school at Esc. Bellas Artes in Lima under the tutelage of Ángel Cuadros. Nina has won multiple awards for his work, including but not limited to Premio de Dibujo de Esc. Bellas Artes. Segundo Premio Mitchell y Cía. Mención Honrosa and X Concurso Nacional de Artistas Jóvenes ICPNA.

Nina's paintings are typically composed using oil or watercolor. Watercolor specifically has become widely popular among Peru's painters. Nina's work, while unique, is representative of the regional appropriation of the medium.

Since 1987, Nina has had numerous exhibits of his work, varying from one-man exhibits at galleries like Dos miradas y un corazón partido at la Galería Pancho Fierro in 2010 to a group show at the United States Peruvian Embassy during "Noche de Arte Embajada de EE.UU. Puericultorio Perez Aranibar" the same year.

Nina has held a Professorship at Escuela Nacional Superior Autónoma de Bellas Artes in Peru since 2000.

== Solo exhibitions ==
- 1987 – “Bodegones y Retratos”, óleos y dibujos, Biblioteca Municipalidad de Moquegua.
- 1990 – “Comunicación y Desarrollo” – Galería de Alianza Francesa de Miraflores Lima.
- 1995 – “Paisajes de Moquegua”, óleos, casa de maestro, Moquegua.
- 2000 – “Resplandor”, óleos y acuarelas Museo Contisuyo, Moquegua.
- 2001 – “Homenaje al Realismo”, Galería 715 San Borja, Lima.
- 2002 – “Reflejo del Tiempo” Acuarelas, Galería 715 San Borja, Lima.
- 2003 – “Reflejo del Tiempo” óleos y Acuarelas Museo Contisuyo, Moquegua.
- 2003 – “Celebraciones” Galería del Arte de la Fundación del Banco de Comercio Miraflores, Lima.
- 2003 – “Exposición Itinerante: Arequipa Centro Cultural Peruano Norteamericano Puno Escuela Superior de Formación Artística.
- 2004 – Moquegua Museo Contisuyo.
- 2005 – “Peregrinación”. Exposición de óleos y acuarelas del Instituto Peruano Norteamericano de Lima.
