= Eugene Montgomery =

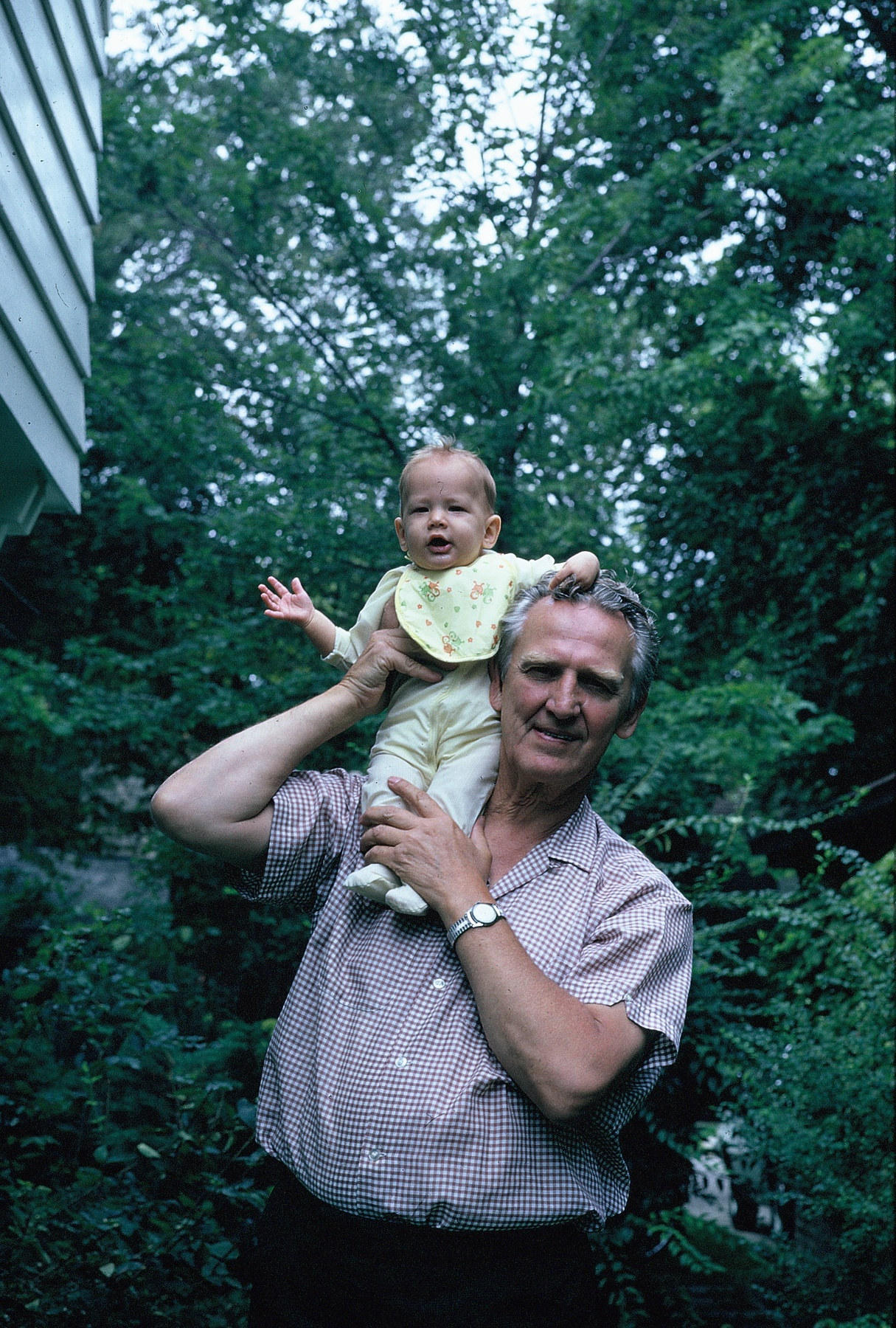
- Eugene A. Montgomery (artist) with grandson, Geoffrey D. Edwards in 1963

Eugene Alexander Montgomery, a painter and illustrator, was born in Port Arthur, Texas, in 1905 and died in Aurora, Illinois on December 16, 2001 of complications from a broken hip.

Montgomery moved to Chicago in the 1920s to study at the Art Institute of Chicago. He began his career in advertising and his first commercial work, a sketch of his daughter, was bought by the Carnation Milk Co. and used on their magazine advertisements.

Montgomery continued to do commercial illustration for many years, and worked in many genres, but gained most of his recognition as a portrait painter and a muralist. Montgomery was a prolific portrait painter and often used his family as models. He was hired to paint numerous corporation chairpersons and executives, or those being recognized by companies, such as G.E. vacuum tube pioneer Saul Dushman. He was commissioned by Sears Roebuck to paint a series of portraits of its founders and officers, and many of his portraits still are displayed in the Sears Tower in Chicago. Montgomery painted similar portraits for companies such as Allstate and Motorola, and for heads of hospitals and universities. Montgomery's most famous and most widely viewed portrait is probably that which he was commissioned to do of University of Notre Dame football coach Knute Rockne in the 1930s. The portrait remains in the University collection in South Bend, Indiana. Montgomery also painted anonymous portraits, such as Woman with Mandolin, which hangs prominently in the guest house of Oprah Winfrey. Another notable work, a portrait of Motorola founder Paul Galvin, hangs today in the Crerar Library (now the Galvin Library) of the Illinois Institute of Technology. In the 1930s he also drew a portrait of Ernest Rutherford for the Central Scientific Company.

Besides portraits, Montgomery gained national recognition for his large murals. Sears hired him to paint murals for many of its stores around the country, typically showing scenes from local history. His first such mural was for a store in Houston in 1939. His last known mural, for Allstate Insurance in Chicago in the 1950s, depicted the history of the automobile age. The unveiling of Montgomery's 70' mural of Mecklenburg County at the grand opening of the new Sears store in Charlotte, North Carolina in 1949, one of a series of 12 commissioned by Sears, was a major event, and when the store was eventually torn down, the mural was relocated to South Mecklenburg High School in 1970.

In 1942, Montgomery was featured in the Art Institute of Chicago's exhibition of prize-winning Chicago-area artists. Some of his work is also on display at the Covenant United Methodist Church in Evanston.

Montgomery painted and taught until he was 85, working out of his home studio in Skokie, Illinois.
