= William H. Mosby =

American painter

- William H. Mosby Self Portrait, "The Squint" 1951
- Born: William Harry Mosby; 24 January 1898; Sioux City, Iowa
- Died: 1964 (aged 65–66); Wilmette, Illinois
- Education: Belgian Royal Academy
- Known for: Painting, Drawing, Illustration, Instructor Portraits
- Movement: Golden Age American Illustration

Bill Mosby (born William Harry Mosby on 24 January 1898, Sioux City, Iowa) was a portrait artist and an important American teacher of fine arts.

== Life and work ==
William H. Mosby was an American painter, portraiture artist and illustrator, as well as an instructor at the American Academy of Art in Chicago.

Mosby was born in Sioux City, IA in 1898. After serving in the United States Army in World War I, he attended the Chicago Academy of Fine Arts. In 1924, he went to Europe and enrolled in the Royal Academy of Fine Arts in Brussels, Belgium. In Europe, he learned classical technique under the tutelage of artists who had studied under luminaries such as Monet, Sargent, and Degas. He later shared that knowledge with his students at the American Academy of Art in Chicago. He taught there from 1930 until his death in 1964. Prior to WW2, Mosby was awarded a scholarship to The National Higher Institute of Fine Arts in Antwerp, Belgium. He also served with the U.S. Army along the Mexican Border in 1917 and during WW1 in 1919 with the American expeditionary Forces in France. He served again during WW II in the U.S. Navy.

An exceptional painter, he exhibited at the Art Institute of Chicago in 1934 and 1936. He also did illustration work between 1927 and 1932 for such companies as Mars Candy, Portland Cement, Goodrich Tires, Chrysler, Pierce-Arrow, Dodge, Swift & Co. A mural by Mosby is in the St Matthew's Episcopal Church in Chicago.

Students Include : Richard Schmid, Gil Elvgren, Ted Smuskiewcz, Bill Parks, Howard Terpning, James J. Ingwersen and others.

Teacher: Charles Hermans and Student of Louis Gallait, Opsomer
