= Killiney =

Suburb of Dublin, Ireland

Killiney Cill Iníon Léinín (Irish)
- Suburb
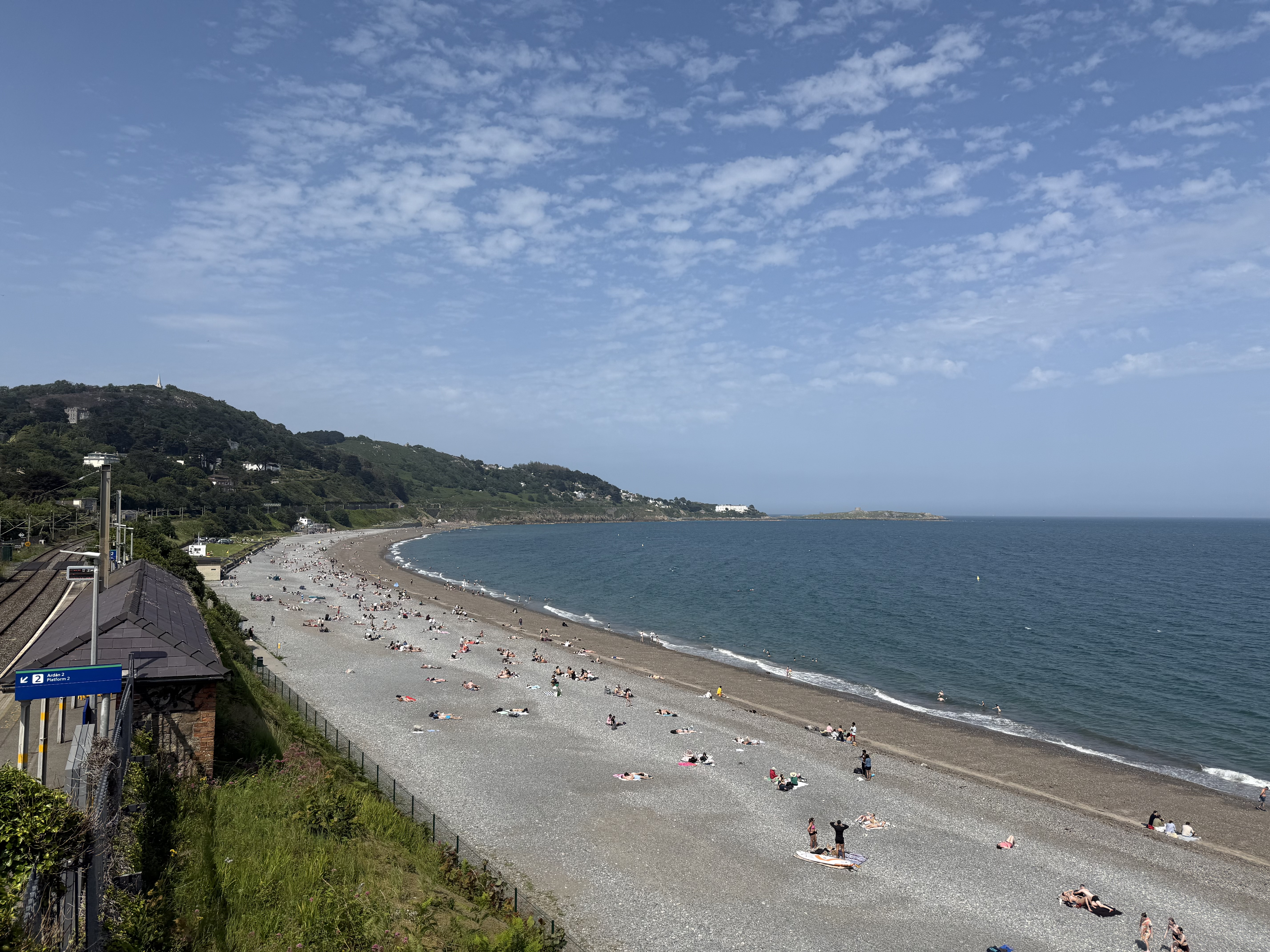
- Killiney Beach in 2025. Killiney train station can be seen on the left.

- Location in Ireland
- Coordinates: 53.2651°N 6.1137°W
- Country: Ireland
- Province: Leinster
- County: County Dublin
- Local government area: Dún Laoghaire–Rathdown
- Elevation: 30 m (98 ft)

Population (2002)
  - Urban: 10,600
- Eircode routing key: A96
- Area code: 01 (+3531)
- Irish Grid Reference: O240261

Killiney (Irish: Cill Iníon Léinín, meaning 'church of the daughters of Léinín') is an affluent coastal suburb on the southside of Dublin, Ireland. It lies south of Dalkey, east and northeast of Ballybrack and Sallynoggin and north of Shankill, in the local government area of Dún Laoghaire–Rathdown within County Dublin. The place grew around the 11th century Killiney Church, and became a popular seaside resort in the 19th century. The area is notable for some famous residents, including two members of U2, and Enya. Killiney is in a civil parish of the same name, in the barony of Rathdown.

== Amenities ==
The village centre of Killiney contains a pub, the Druid's Chair. To the north is a hotel, Fitzpatrick's Castle Hotel since 1971, and beyond that a small shopping centre established in the 1970s, and nearer Ballybrack some further retail facilities. Between the hotel and the café are two churches, one Church of Ireland, and one a secondary Catholic church or chapel, open briefly weekly. A Le Chéile Schools Trust school, Holy Child Killiney, is located near the coast.

Killiney Hill Park was opened in 1887 as Victoria Hill, in honour of Queen Victoria's 50 years on the British throne; its lands were once part of the estate of Killiney Castle, now Fitzpatrick's Castle Hotel. The park has views of Dublin Bay, Killiney Bay, Bray Head and the mountain of Great Sugar Loaf (506 m), stretching from the Wicklow Mountains right across to Howth Head. The Park's topography is steep, and its highest point, at the obelisk, is 170 metres above sea level. Near one entrance are tea rooms around a 19th-century tower.

Other attractions include Killiney Beach and other beach sections to its north, one with a coffee van, Killiney Golf Club, a Martello Tower, and the ruins of Cill Iníon Léinín, the church around which the original village was based. There is parking for the beaches in two locations, one near the DART station, and a public right-of-way runs from Vico Road across a dedicated bridge over the railway and down to a northern stretch of Killiney Strand and Vico Baths.

The coastal areas of Killiney are often compared to the Bay of Naples in Italy. This comparison is reflected in the names of surrounding roads, like Vico, Sorrento, Monte Alverno, San Elmo and Capri. On clear days, the Mourne Mountains of County Down can be seen. Since early 2010, a pod of bottlenose dolphins has been seen occasionally in Killiney Bay.

== History ==
The village of Killiney takes its name from the site of the Nuns' Abbey. Leinin, a local chieftain, and his seven daughters, converted to Christianity, and together they went on to found a monastic community at what is now Marino Avenue West. The family are commemorated in the stained-glass windows of the Church of St Alphonsus and Columba in Ballybrack, just a couple of minutes' walk away. Although the establishment of the first church dates back to the sixth century, the current roofless ruin at its location dates from the 11th century; this tiny chapel marks the historical centre of Killiney village, and can still be viewed today.

For many centuries, the major part of the district, including Killiney Hill, was the property of the Talbot de Malahide family, some of the original followers from the 1170 Norman invasion. The obelisk on top of Killiney Hill records the famine of 1741 and the relief works made for the poor which include the obelisk and the many walls which cover the top of the hill. By the 19th century, the areas to the north and east of the village were owned by Robert Warren, who developed many of the Victorian residential roads. The Warrens also sold the land required to extend the Dublin and Kingstown Railway to Killiney and ultimately Bray.

Killiney beach was a popular seaside destination for Dubliners, and John Rocque's 1757 map shows bath-houses near White Rock, on Killiney Beach. The coastline became even more popular once the railway opened, and the opening of Victoria Park in 1887 and of Vico Road in 1889 appear to have increased this popularity further. Victoria Castle (later renamed Ayesha Castle) was also built in honour of Queen Victoria, marking her accession to the throne. This is currently owned by County Donegal-born singer Enya who renamed it after Manderley, the stately house that featured in the 1938 Daphne du Maurier novel Rebecca.

Killiney remained a near-rural area from 1900 until the late 1940s, despite its proximity to Dublin city. From the early 1960s, the economy began to expand, causing Dublin's outer suburbs to extend as far as Killiney.

=== 20th-century development ===
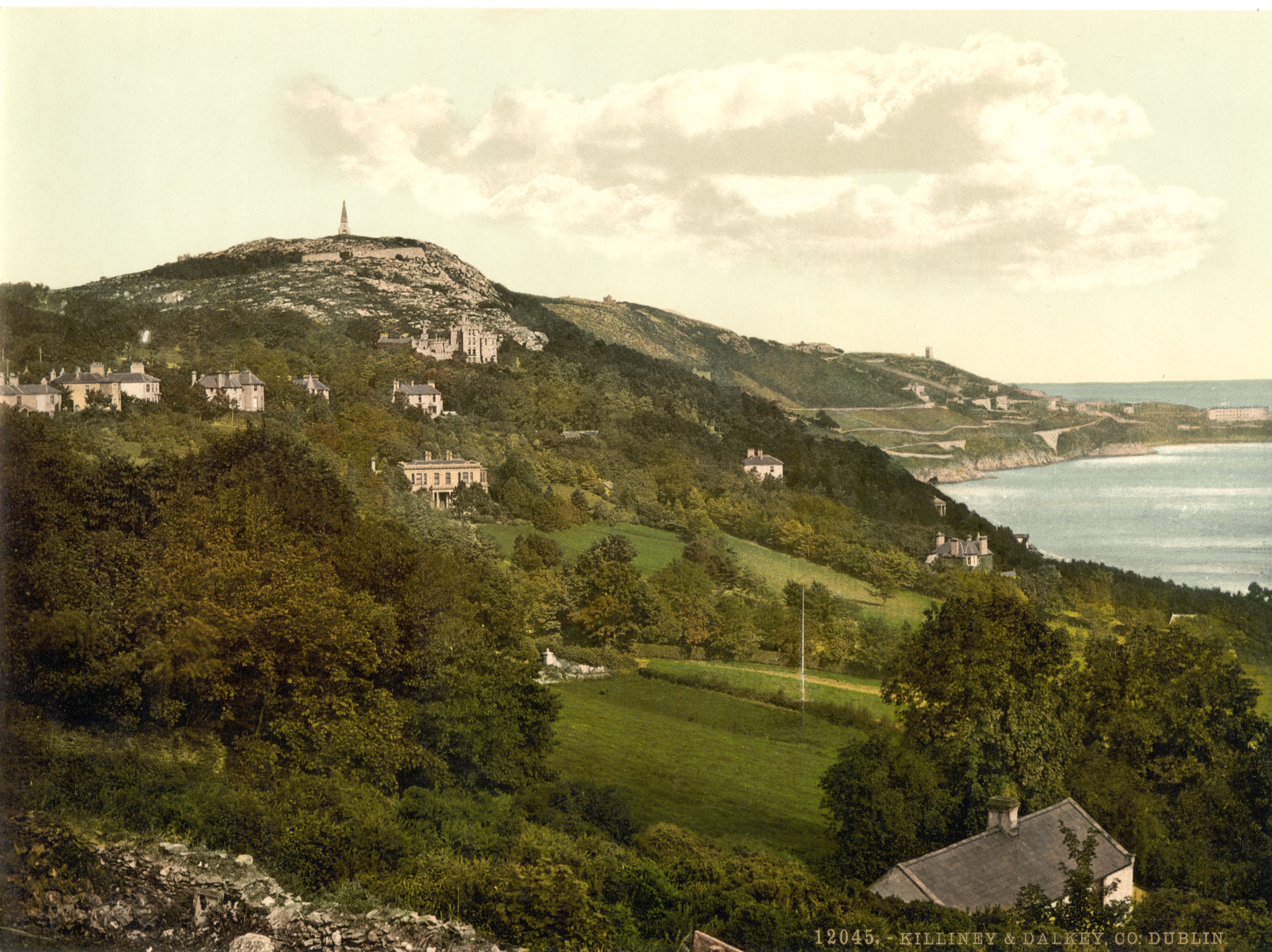
Killiney at the beginning of the 20th century

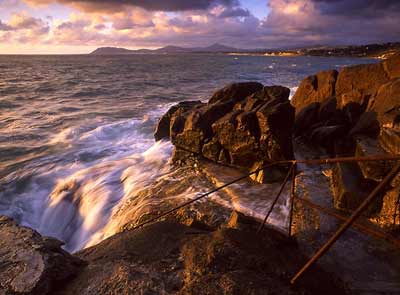
Killiney Bay from Vico Baths

In the first half of the twentieth century, the Electoral Division of North Killiney still consisted of a small village at its centre and a number of suburban roads lined with large houses. A few modest cottages were occupied by working-class locals and bohemian residents such as George Bernard Shaw, whose house, Torca Cottage, is close to the boundary with Dalkey.

South Killiney consisted of farmland, uncultivated hillside and woodland, a few large country houses (Ballinclea House, in particular, owned by the Talbot de Malahide family destroyed by fire in the early 1970s, and Rochestown House, near to the contemporary Killiney Shopping Centre), the convent of the Sisters of St. Joseph of Cluny, and Killiney Golf Club, a nine-hole course founded in 1903.

Killiney's population grew substantially in the decades following the Emergency as the urbanisation of Ireland and the suburbanisation of Dublin progressed. The main divisions of the area locals might identify would be Killiney Hill Park (with the hotel and churches), Roche's Hill (locally called Mullins' Hill), Killiney village itself, North Killiney (Cluny Grove, Killiney Road, Ballinclea), and the cluster of roads on the seaward slopes of Killiney Hill - Killiney Hill Road, Marina Road West, Victoria Road, Strathmore Road and Vico Road. Much of the area is developed with two-storey housing, at average densities of 10 to 30 houses per hectare. To the south of Killiney lies the suburban estates of Seafield Court and Bayview, which were constructed in the mid-1980s.

The population, as recorded by the Census of Ireland, peaked in 1996 at approximately 10,800 and has dropped by about 12% since then, as falling average family sizes have outpaced residential construction.

== Transport ==
=== Bus ===
The area is served by the 59 bus route operated by Go-Ahead Ireland (previously Dublin Bus) which runs hourly from Killiney Village to Marine Road, Dún Laoghaire. The journey takes 25 minutes.

An Aircoach service starting at Fitzpatrick's Castle Hotel links Killiney with Dublin Airport every hour, 24 hours a day.

=== Rail ===
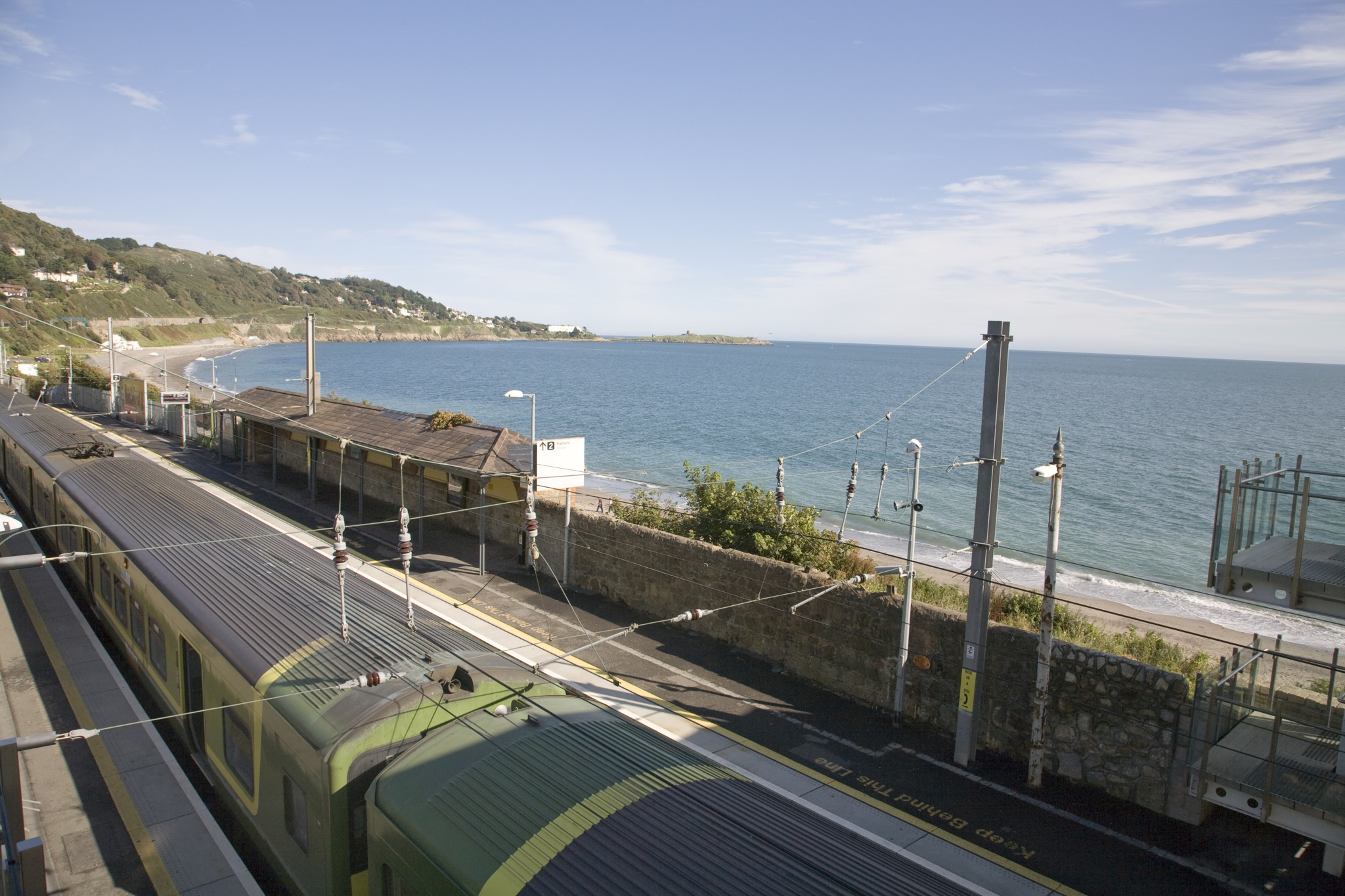
Killiney railway station delivers passengers right to the beach

Killiney railway station, served by the DART, is located on Station Road.

== Notable people ==
Killiney is Dublin's most exclusive residential area. Its notable residents include U2 members Bono and the Edge. Former racing driver Eddie Irvine is also occasionally seen in Killiney. Actor Allen Leech was born in Killiney, as was radio presenter Paddy O'Byrne. Singer Enya lives in Manderley Castle in Killiney. Gardener Alice Lawrenson lived in Killiney in the 1800s.

The 1960s rock band Mellow Candle, originated in Killiney, was formed by students from the Holy Child Convent.

== See also ==
- List of towns and villages in Ireland
- Killiney Castle

== Sources ==
- The History of Killiney Hill Park Dunlaoghaire-Rathdown County Council
- Carrickmines Castle, the Vale of Shanganagh, Dalkey, Killiney and Ballybrack Hills (Waybackmachine archive link)
- Pearson, Peter (1998). Between the Mountains and the Sea: Dún Laoghaire–Rathdown County, Dublin: The O'Brien Press. ISBN 0-86278-582-0.
