= John Murdoch (artist) =

American painter

- Born: 1971 (age 54–55); Oak Lawn, Illinois
- Education: American Academy of Art, Chicago, The Atelier, Minneapolis, School of Representational Art, Chicago
- Known for: painting, drawing,

John Murdoch (born 1971) is an American painter, portraitist, and art teacher. He is the founder of Gold Light Studios and the Classical Art and Atelier Fund.

== Life and work ==
Murdoch was born in Oak Lawn, Illinois, a suburb of Chicago. From an early age he developed drawing skills in anatomy, perspective, and figure drawing. He attended the American Academy of Art on scholarship where he was mentored by artists Lou Ann Burkhardt and Fred Berger. Murdoch's work at the academy was influenced by William Mosby and realist painter Richard Schmid.

Following this he studied at The Atelier, Minneapolis, and at the School of Representational Art in Chicago where he studied under Mike Chelich and Bruno Surdo, and was mentored by portraitist Richard Halstead.

After his atelier training he lived at Mount Rainier in Washington State, followed by Mendocino County, California, and Sedona, Arizona, before moving to Barcelona, Spain. He also traveled and studied throughout France, Italy, Hungary and the Czech Republic. He then settled close to Princeton, New Jersey where he worked at a number of art studios, and exhibited in one- and two-man shows, including those with artists James Freeman and John Ennis. After living in New Jersey for 10 years he moved to Bucks County, Pennsylvania, where he founded the Gold Light Studios and Atelier. He was a founding member of the Classical Arts and Atelier Fund, which hosted its first Bohemian Rhapsody Scholarship fundraiser in 2011. As of 2012, he lives in Perkasie, Pennsylvania.

Murdoch has taught at Princeton Arts Council, Montgomery MiddleSchool, Princeton University, and at his own Gold Light Studio in Bucks County where he promotes the "apprentice-style" training of classical ateliers.

His work has been published in International Artist Magazine, American Artist Magazine, The New York Times, The Times, and the Doylestown Intelligencer.

== Style ==
Murdoch is a classically trained artist. He chiefly paints with an "otherworldly edge". His subjects are angels, the human figure, and portraits, worked primarily in oil on wood panel or canvas, and with the use of gold leaf. His artistic influences include Jacques-Louis David, J.W. Waterhouse, and Paul Delaroche.

== Awards ==
- Salmagundi Club, Forbes magazine Award
- International Artist Magazine, First Place, Still Life and Florals
- Residency, Galesburc Civic Art Center
- Resident artist teacher of the year, Arts Council of Princeton
- Residency, Baltonfured Hungary
- John and Anna Lee Stacy Scholarship
John Murdoch works

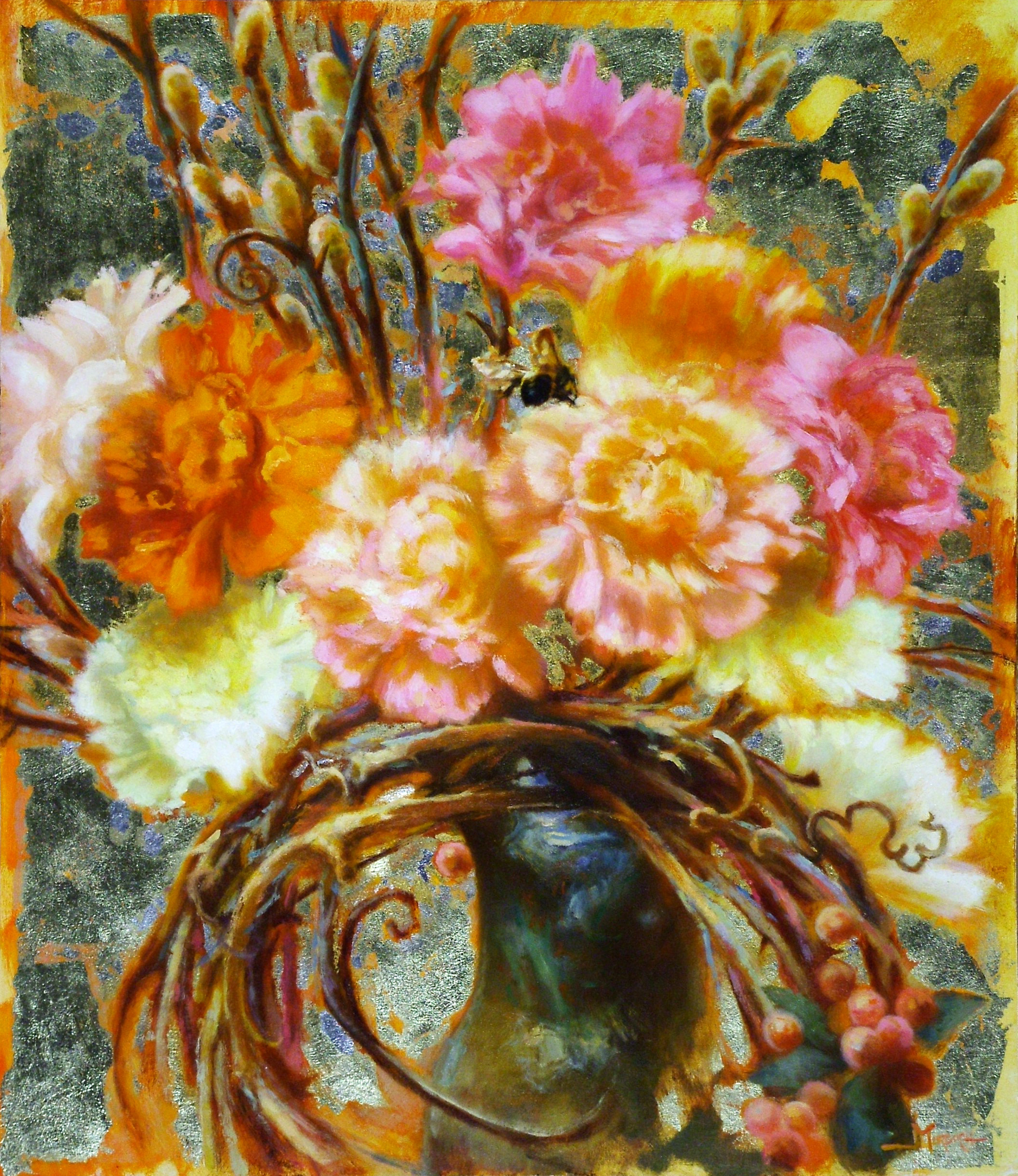
Carnations and Bee

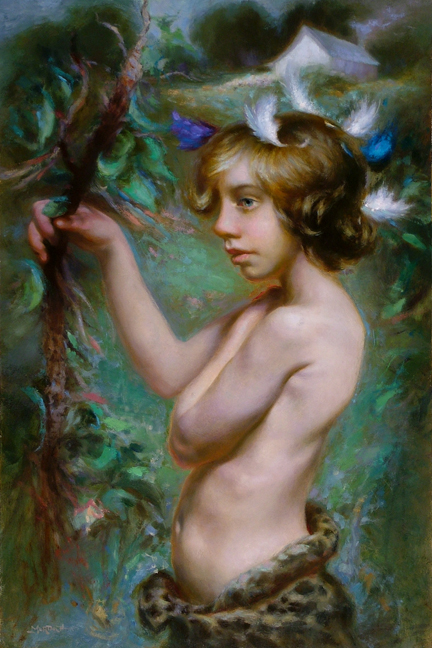
Braydon as Bucks County Lord of the Flies

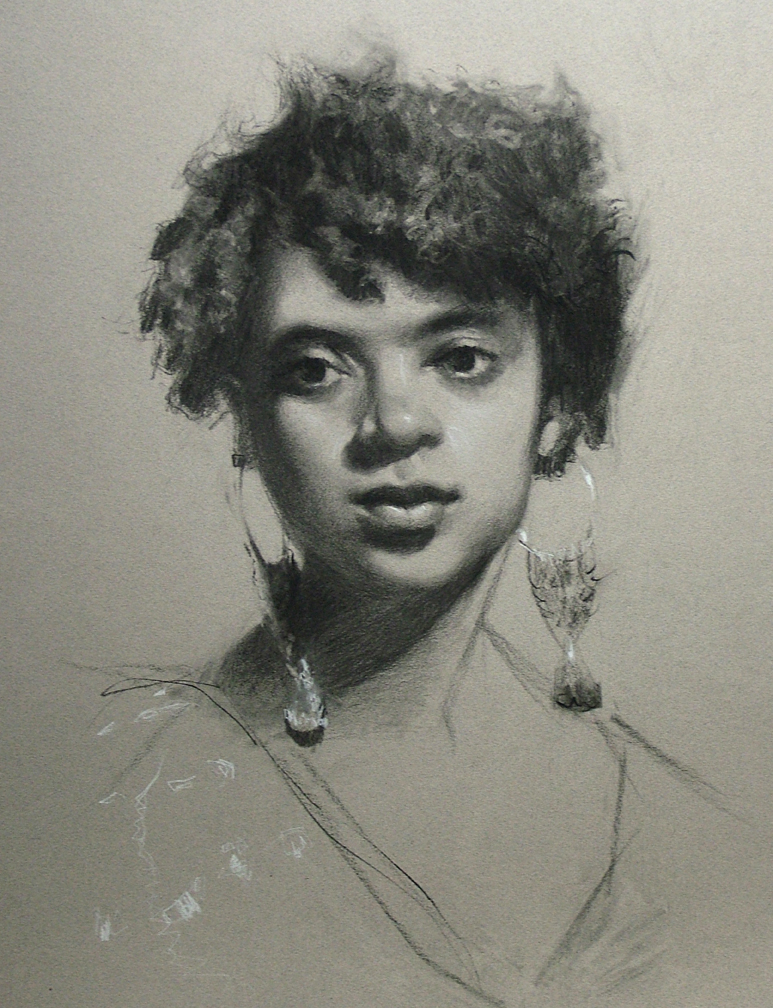
Jessica Chambers
