= Royal Female School of Art =

Former art school in London, England

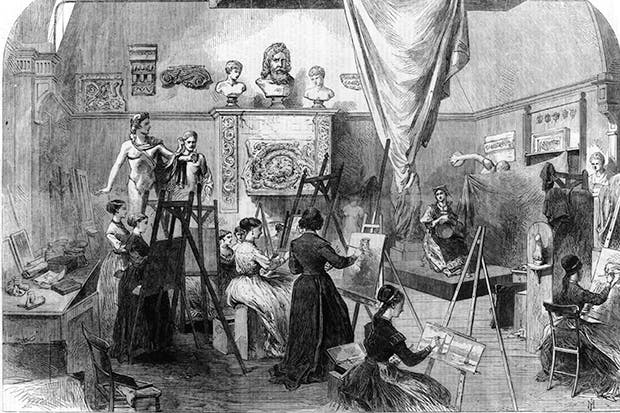
Life class at the Royal Female School of Art, 1868

The Royal Female School of Art was a professional British institution for the training of women in art and design. It was founded in London in 1842, as part of the Government School of Design, predecessor of the Royal College of Art. It was merged with the Central School of Art and Design in 1914.

== History ==
The Female School of Design was moved in 1849 out of Somerset House, which until then accommodated both male and female classes, and remained in separate premises for the rest of its life, notably in Gower Street from 1852, then Queen Square from 1860. When Henry Cole took over management of the Schools of Design in 1852 he established more advanced and technical classes for women within the senior, central school, which moved to South Kensington in 1858.

Many of the students of the Female School during the 1840s and 1850s moved on from Gower Street to study in the more advanced classes, and some of them returned, over the course of the 1850s, to the Female School of Art in Gower Street as teachers. Others were sent to head up the female branches of government art schools in Edinburgh (Susan Ashworth) and Dublin (Mary Julyan). In 1860 the Female School of Art was put on the same financial basis as other branch Schools of Design, resulting in a reduction in its public subsidy and necessitating a change of location and management while it remained affiliated to the national institution. These arrangements continued until 1909 when it was transferred to the control of London County Council, initially via the Central School of Art and Design (now part of the University of the Arts London), with which it was merged from 1914.

== Staff ==
The first Headmistress of the Female School of Art was English artist Fanny McIan, who oversaw the first fifteen years of its life, retiring in 1857. She was succeeded by Louisa Gann, who had been trained in the Female School of Design, and who, with her core team of teachers trained at South Kensington, managed the Female School of Art throughout its third phase of life, in Queen Square, between 1860 and 1909, and obtained the title Royal Female School of Art in 1885. The emphasis of tuition, which followed to a great extent, but was not confined to, the 'syllabus' established by the national school at South Kensington, was to equip students to gain an income from work as artists, designers, illustrators and teachers, and many pursued all of these activities in the course of their subsequent careers. In 1894 Louisa Gann claimed in a newspaper interview that the majority of students who had completed the course over the years had found work.

== Known students ==
Alumnae who became well-known exhibiting artists include:

- Helen Allingham
- Eliza Mary Burgess
- Evelyn Cheston
- Maud Earl
- Clotilde Graves
- Henrietta Rae
- Louisa Starr
- Eliza Turck

== Other names ==
References can be found to a number of names, including: School of Design for Females, Female School of Design, Gower Street School, Metropolitan School of Art for Females, Royal Female School of Art, Queen Square School of Art, Government School of Art for Ladies.

The Royal Female School of Art Foundation continues to work to support students accessing art education.
