= Peter Michael (artist) =

English painter

- Born: 7 March 1972 (age 54); London, England
- Education: University of East London, Bottega Del Buonfresco, Florence, Italy
- Known for: Painting

Peter Michael (born 7 March 1972) is an English contemporary figurative painter. Michael's work is firmly set in the British painting tradition of Lucian Freud and Jenny Saville, but references his classical Italian fresco training with hints of artists such as Mantegna.

Michael studied at the University of East London where he obtained a degree in Fine Art. He also studied fresco painting at the Bottega Del Buonfresco in Florence, Italy. Furthermore he studied at the Slade School of Fine Art and at Central Saint Martins.

His recent exhibitions include a solo exhibition in Luxembourg (2008). This exhibition made headlines in the Luxembourg press for its graphic and realistic representation of the female nude.
