= Sempan =

Sempan may refer to:

- Sempan language
- Sempan people
- Sempan Maekawa, Japanese woodblock printer
- Sempan village, Bangka Belitung Islands, Indonesia
