= One Hundred Views of New Tokyo =

Woodblock print series

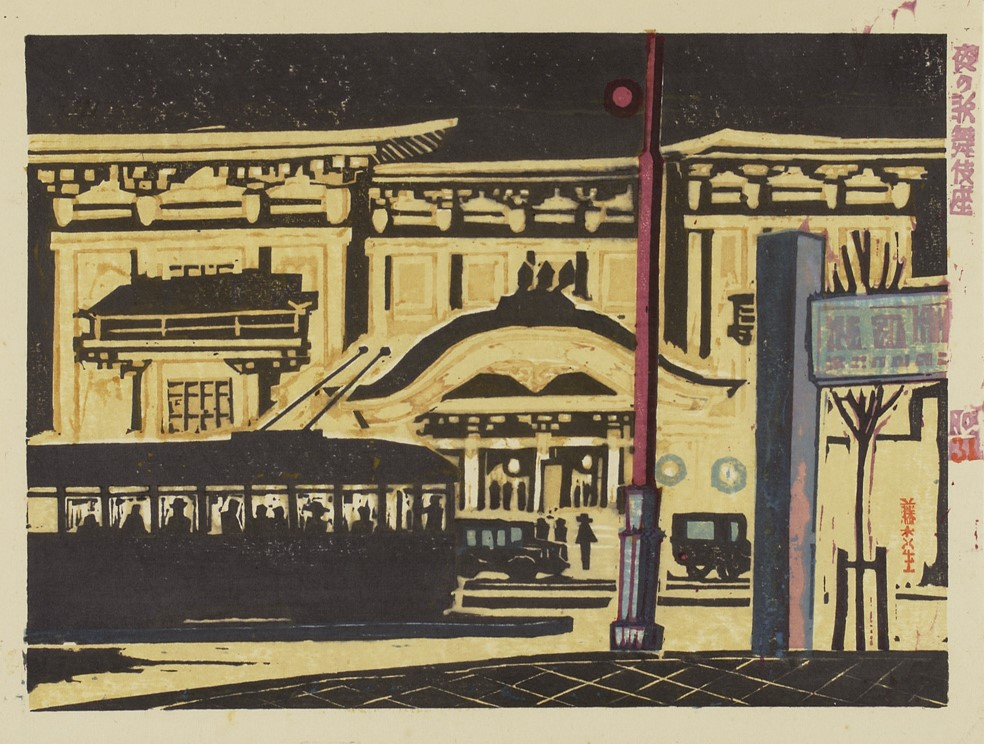
Fujimori Shizuo's Kabuki Theater

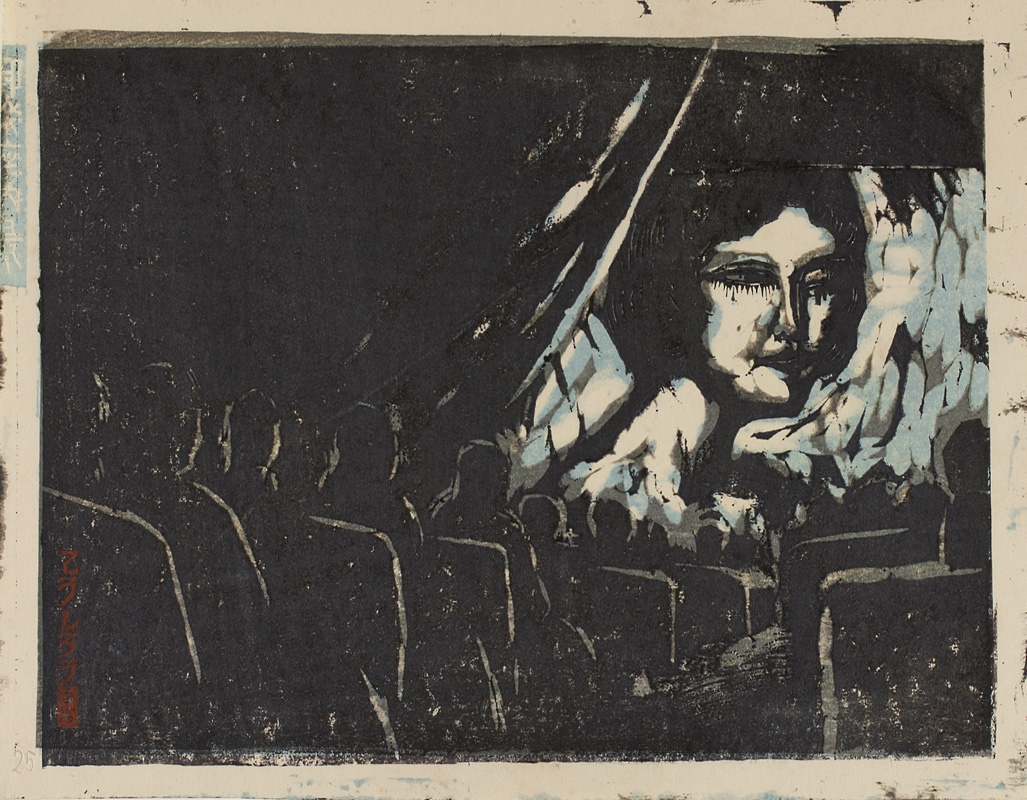
Kōshirō Onchi, Movie theater

One Hundred Views of New Tokyo (新東京百景, Shin Tōkyō Hyakkei) was a series of woodblock prints created from 1928 to 1932 by eight artists of the sōsaku hanga "creative print" movement.

The artists were Un'ichi Hiratsuka, Kōshirō Onchi, Sakuichi Fukazawa, Kawakami Sumio, Senpan Maekawa, Fujimori Shizuo, Henmi Takashi and Suwa Kanenori.

== Publication ==
After much of Tokyo was destroyed by fire after the 1923 Great Kantō earthquake, a new wave of sōsaku-hanga artists banded together and looked to document the changing face of the city, much as Hiroshige's series One Hundred Famous Views of Edo had 75 years earlier.

The artists called themselves the Takujōsha ("Table Group") and the prints were published by the group via Nakajima Jutaro of the Nihon Sosaku Hanga Club. Each artist contributed 12 or 13 prints. The series was issued on a subscription basis in an edition of only 50 sets.

In the February 1932 Bulletin of the Hanga Club, Senpan Maekawa wrote:

Looking back over the Shin Tokyo Hyakkei series, it now seems to have been a very ambitious, long-term undertaking. It was in the autumn of Showa 3 (1928) when the first print by each of the eight artists represented in the series was displayed at the first exhibition of Takujo-sha. We are now in the fifth year since that time, and a five-year job is a very big one in this busy age of ours. Incidentally I must remark that Tokyo today is developing and changing very rapidly. Yesterday’s Tokyo has already changed, and there are many prints in the early part of the series showing places that have changed. So they are really “Old” Tokyo and not “New” Tokyo. Indeed, we could start on another series of Shin Tokyo Hyakkei! I can sympathize with the spirit of the older artists who turned out series of Edo Hyakkei subsequent to the Hiroshige series. Those prints have a very nice taste in accordance with the spirit of the times. It might be a good idea to start another series of Tokyo Hyakkei by other artists; this might make clearer the real width and depth of the great city.

Only a few complete sets have been preserved, and they are now in institutional or private collections.

== Subject matter and techniques ==
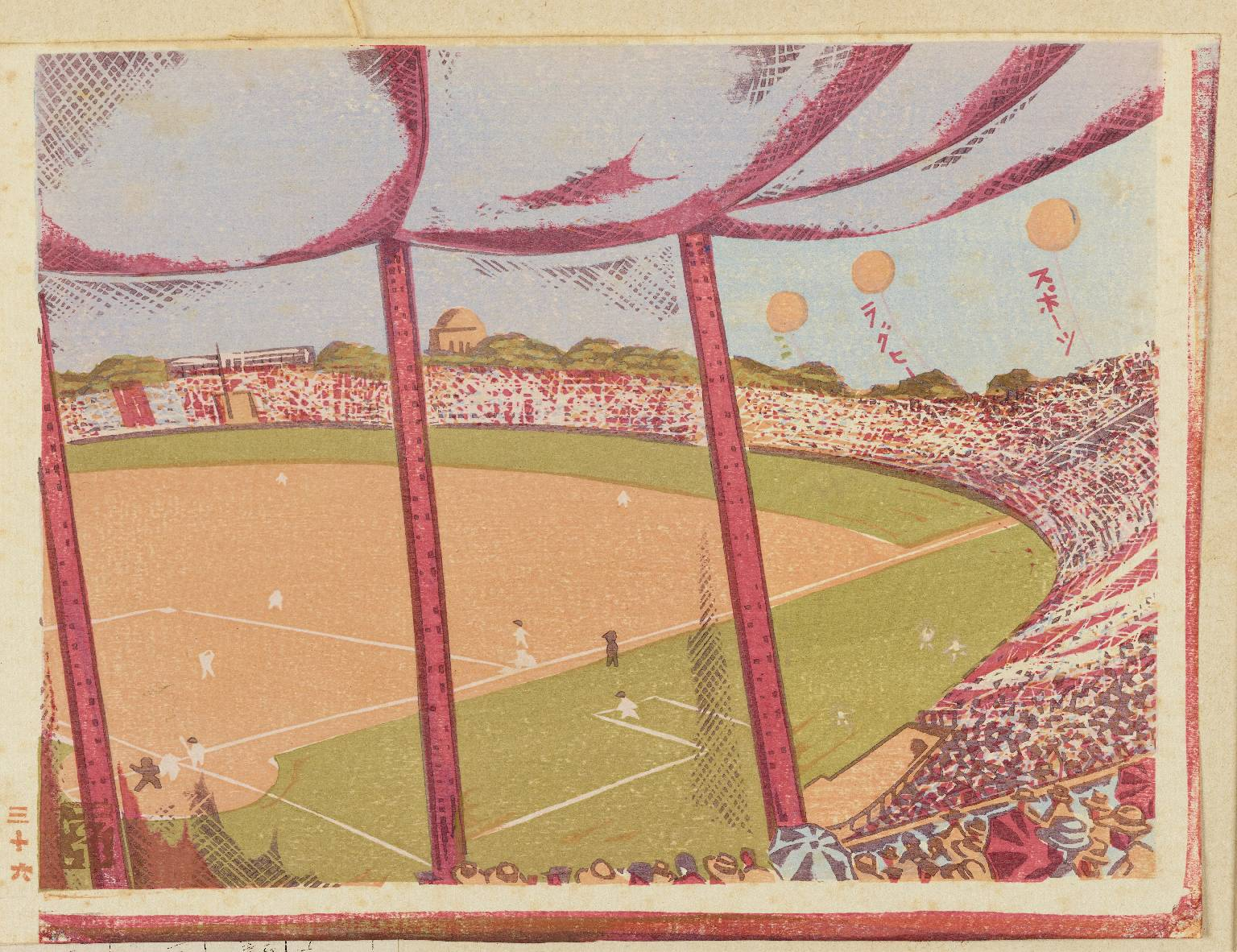
Sakuichi Fukazawa's Baseball Game

Typical of the sōsaku hanga movement, there was much experimentation with colours and types of paper. The themes and subjects vary; some prints hark back to a bygone era such as Hiratuska's Shinobazu Pond in Snow and Fukazawa's Shiba Zōjō-ji Temple which is reminiscent of Hiroshige's work at the same location. The artists' followed their ukiyo-e predecessors by depicting landscapes and the common people at leisure. In homage to Hiroshige's Fifty-three Stations of the Tōkaidō, which started at the same location, Hiratsuka made the first print Nihonbashi, the central point of the city from which all distances were measured. As was common in ukiyo-e prints from the past, bridges feature in many of the prints.

Despite the inclusion of some traditional views, the group were less concerned with the concept of meishō (famous places) and beautiful scenes, but rather they sought to document the Shōwa era lifestyle and depict the rapidly modernizing city. Senpan Maekawa chose to depict miniature golf and a factory district, Onchi a coffee shop and cinema interior. Fukazawa shows a baseball game, while his print of a Shell gasoline station foreshadows the work of Pop art.

== Gallery ==
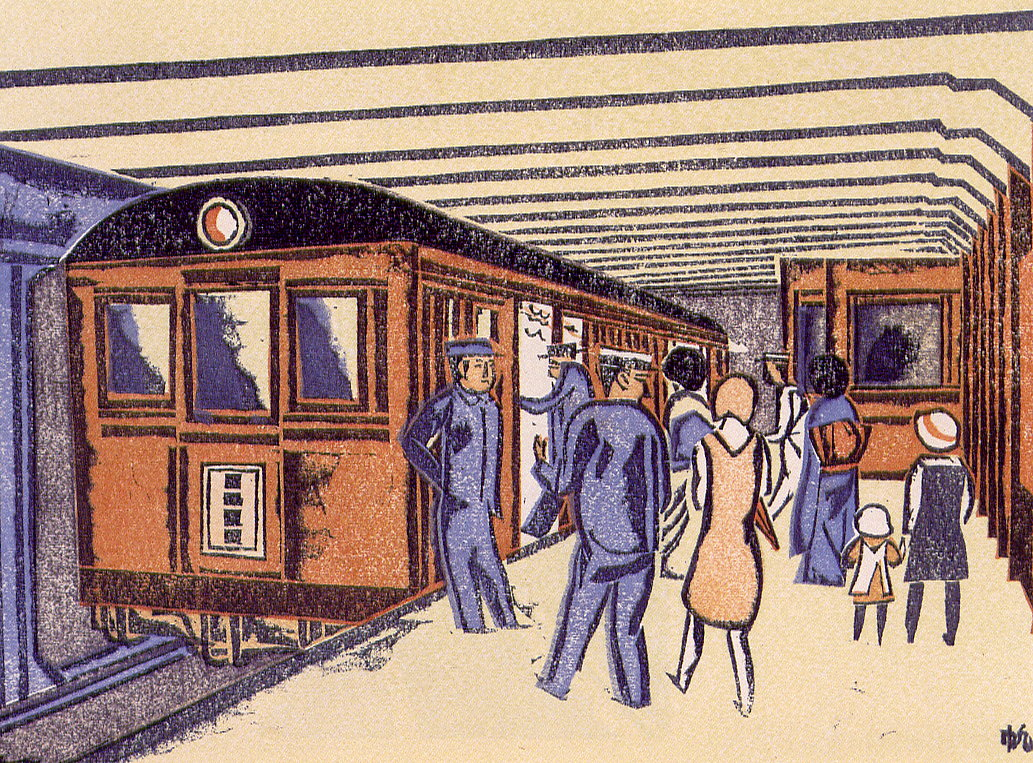
Subway, Senpan Maekawa

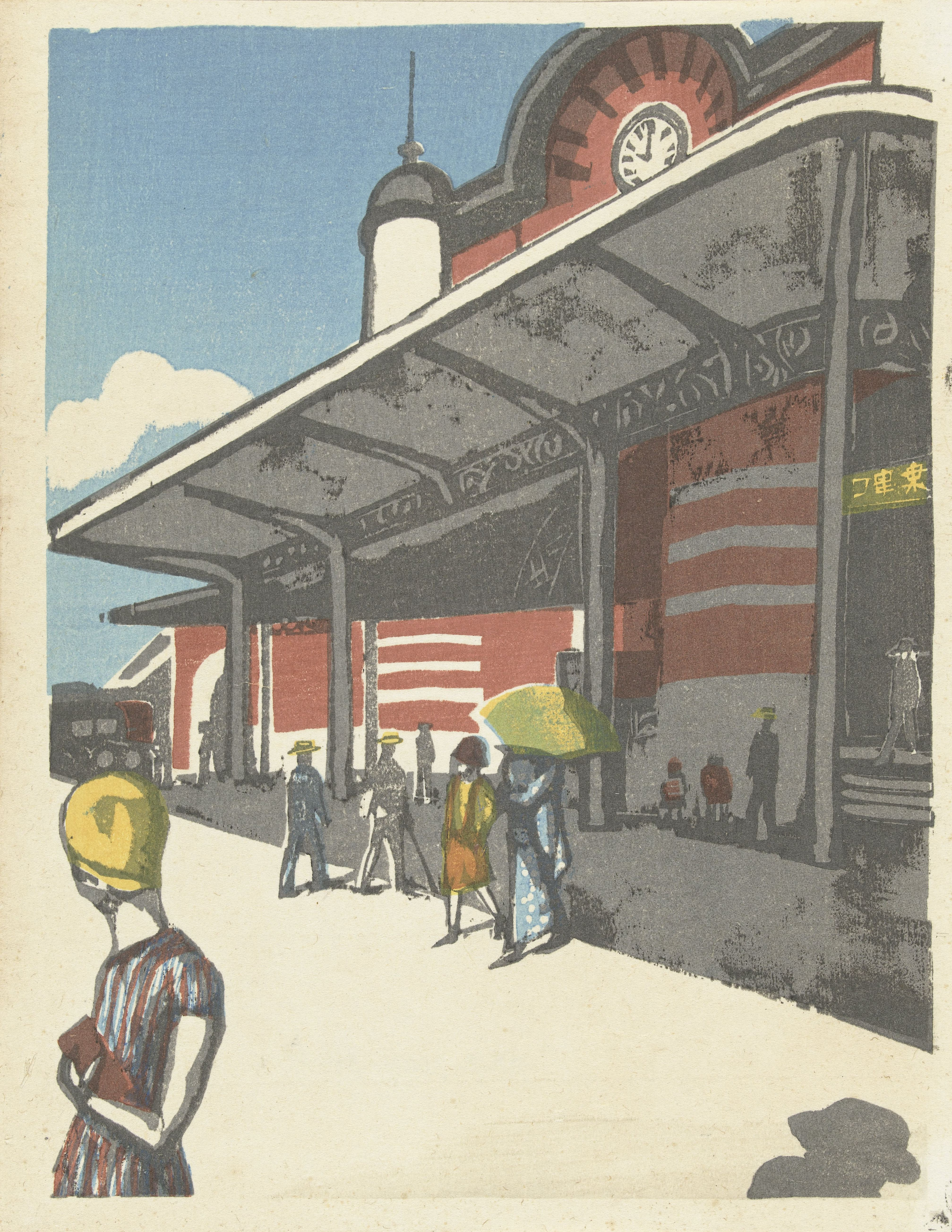
Tokyo Station, Kōshirō Onchi (later impression)

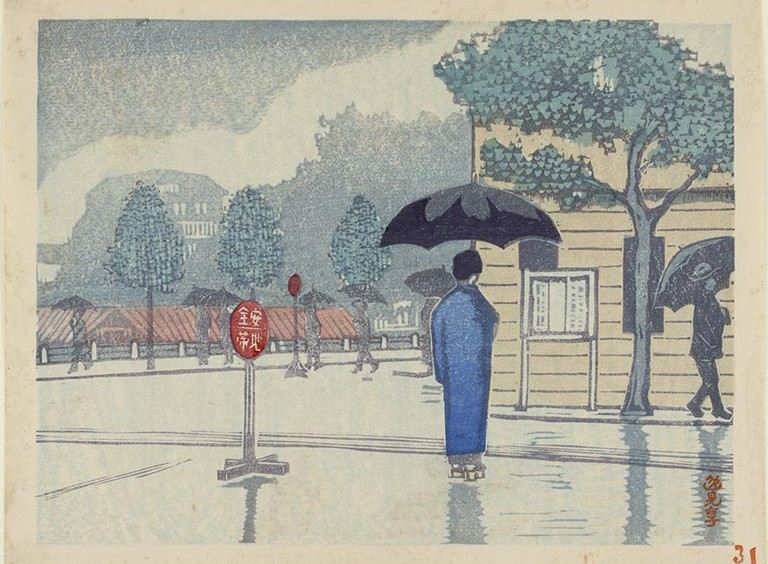
Rain in Yotsuya Mistuke, Henmi Takashi

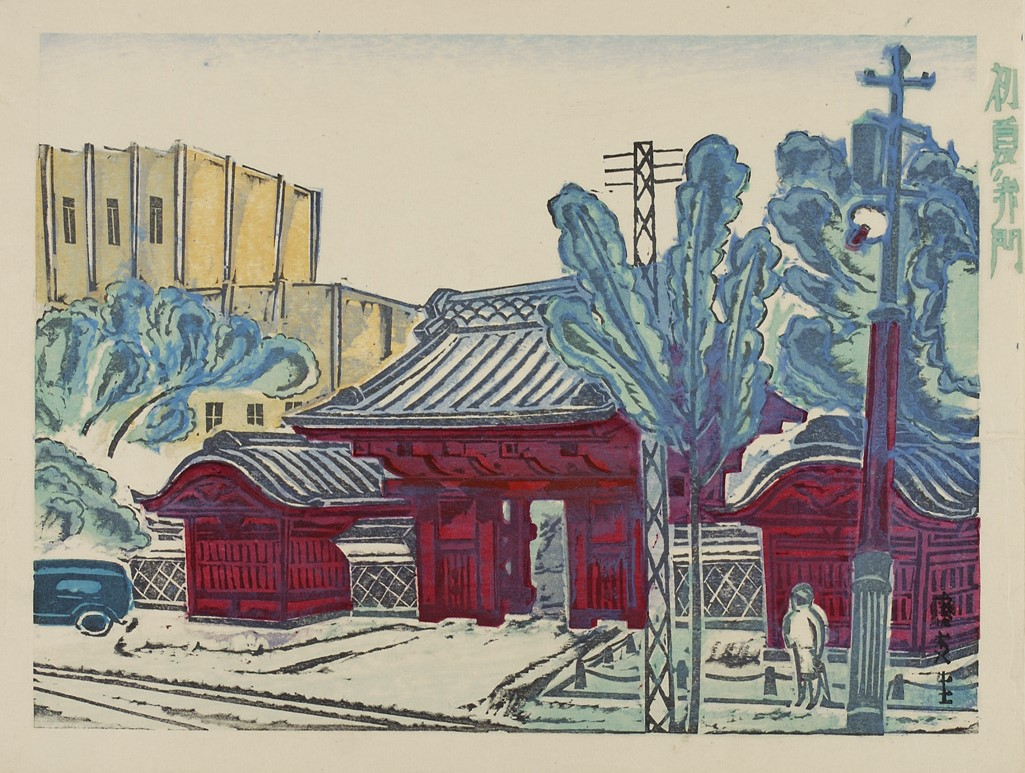
Red Gate in Early Summer, Fujimori Shizuo

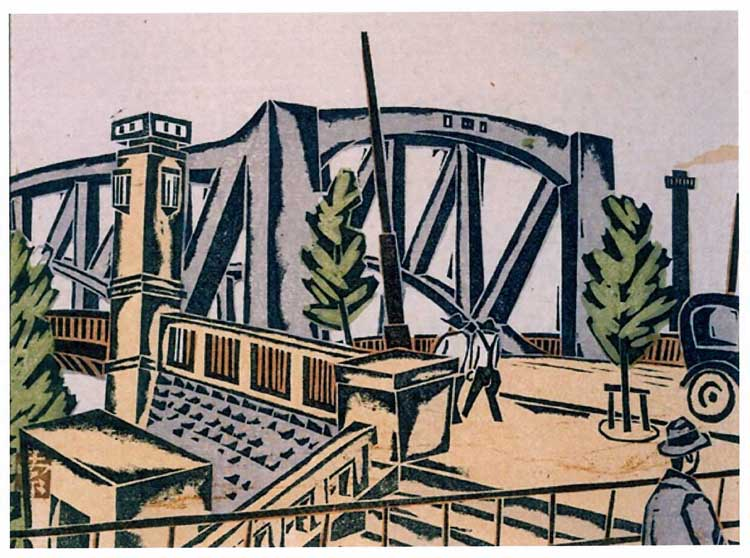
Senju-ōhashi bridge, Sakuichi Fukazawa

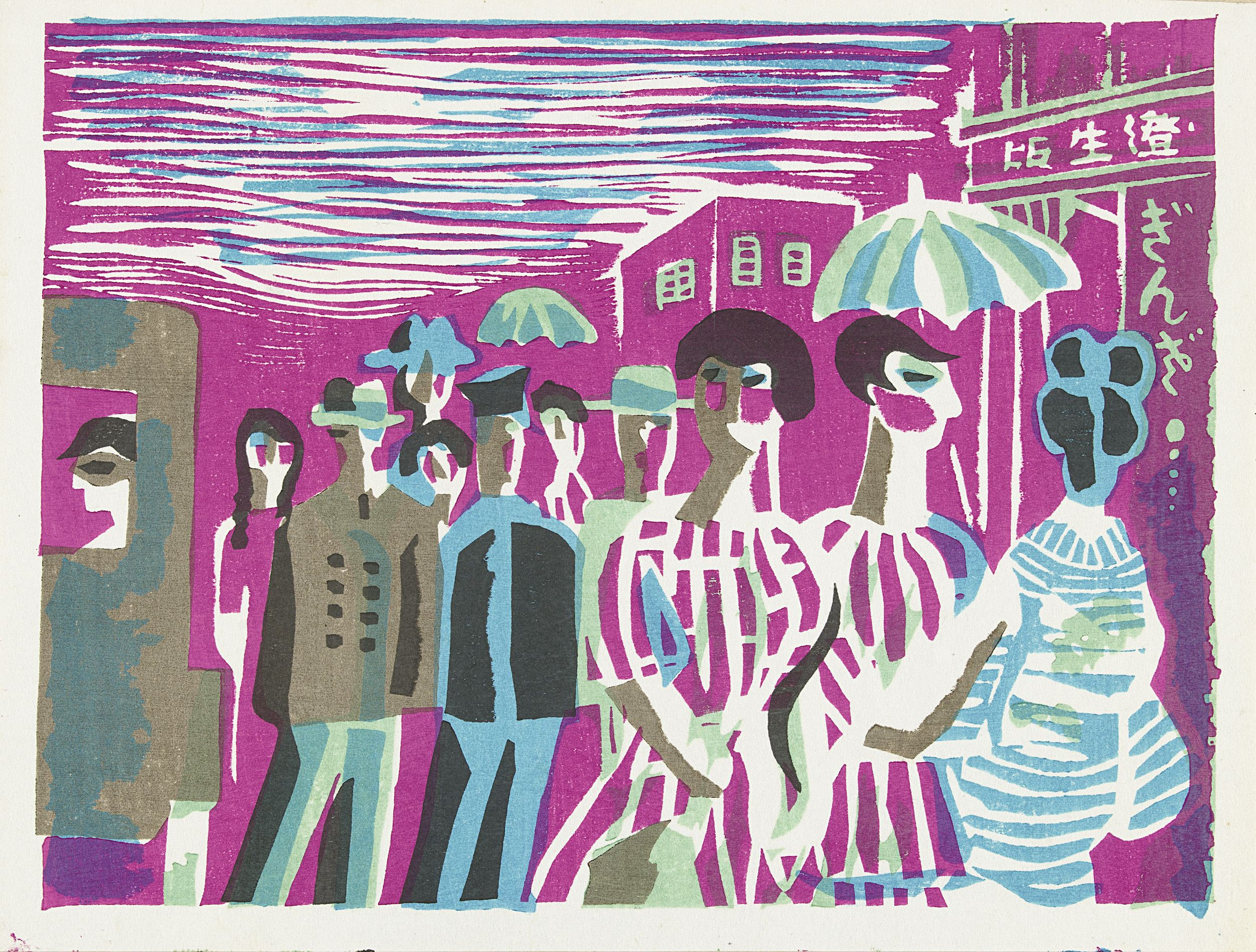
Ginza, Sumio Kawakami (later impression)

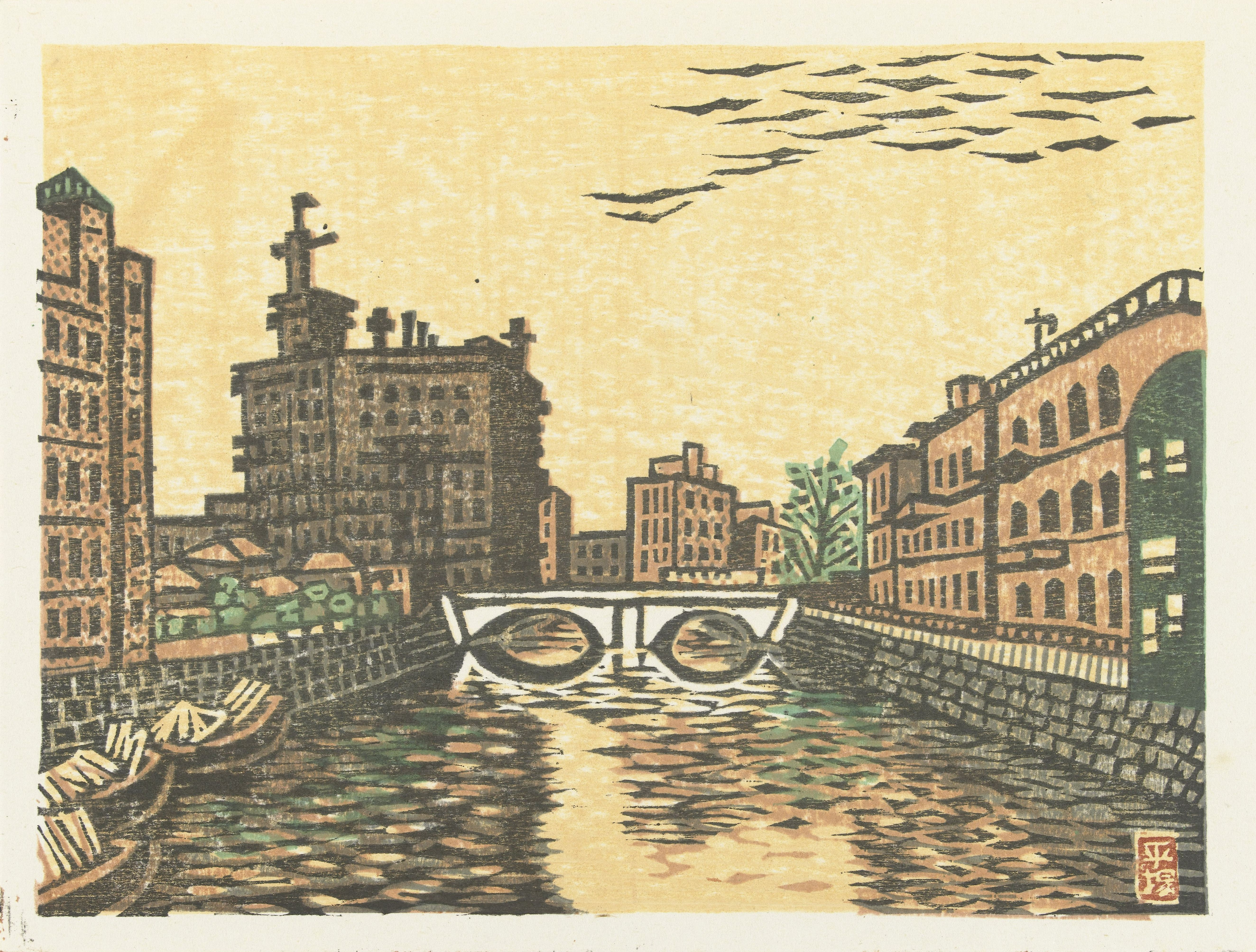
Sukiya Bridge, Un'ichi Hiratsuka (later impression)

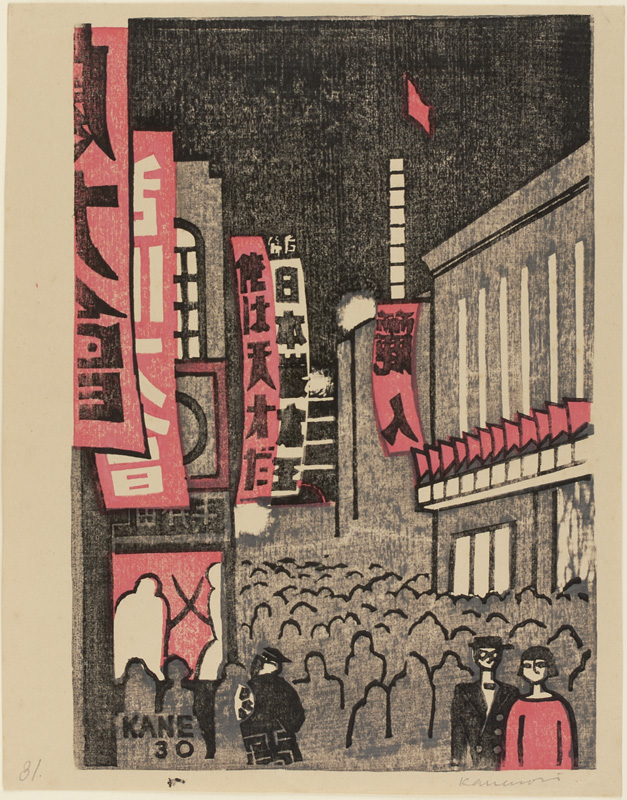
Ginza, Suwa Kanenori

== Other artists on the same theme ==
Other Japanese artists of the Sōsaku Hanga school of this Showa Era produced works on the same theme. In particular, Koizumi Kishio is famous for his series titled "One Hundred Views of Great Tokyo in the Showa Era" ((昭和東京百図絵, Shōwa Tōkyō hyaku zue") which was completed between 1928 and 1940.
