= Koizumi Kishio =

Japanese printmaker (1893–1945)

Koizumi Kishio 小泉癸巳男
- Born: 1893
- Died: December 1945 (aged 51–52)
- Notable work: Showa Dai-Tokyo hyaku zue 昭和大東京百図会 (One Hundred Pictures of Great Tokyo in the Showa Era)
- Movement: Sōsaku-hanga (Creative Print)

Koizumi Kishio (小泉癸巳男; 1893–1945) was a woodblock print artist and member of the creative print movement or sōsaku hanga in the early to mid-twentieth century. He is most famously known for his series "One Hundred Pictures of Great Tokyo in the Showa Era" (Shōwa Dai-Tōkyō Hyaku Zue), which he made between 1928 and 1940 (not to be confused with the multi-artist series "One Hundred Pictures of New Tokyo", created by eight of Koizumi's contemporaries including Kōshirō Onchi and Senpan Maekawa).

Koizumi's work depicts the rapidly modernising city of Tokyo and its recovery in the years following the Great Kantō Earthquake in September 1923. Koizumi is also recognised for his technical publication on woodblock printing published in 1924 entitled The Method of Cutting and Printing Woodblock Prints (Mokuhanga no horikata to surikata), and this textbook was used by many of his colleagues and fellow woodblock artists.

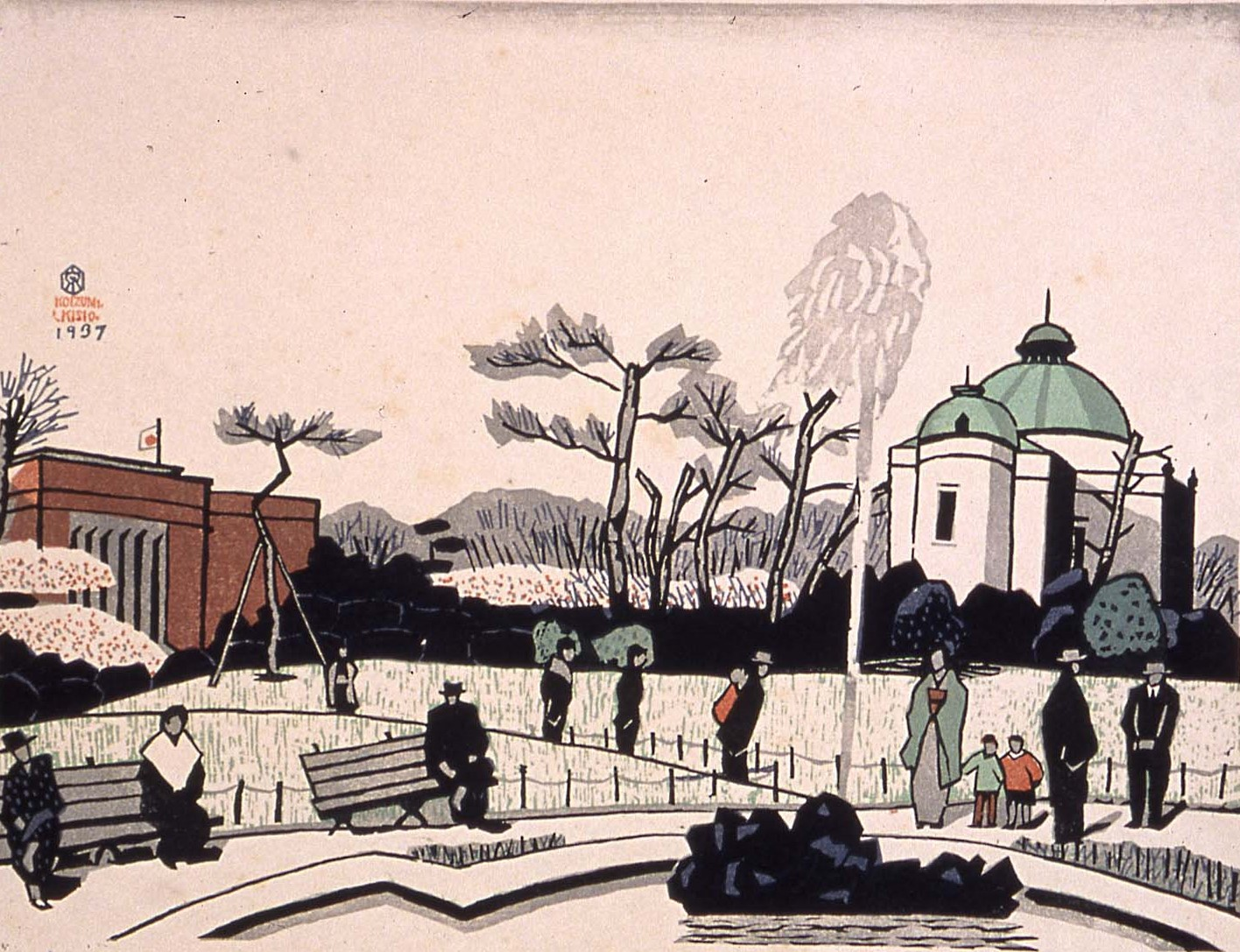
Koizumi Kishio, Ueno fukei (Ueno View), No. 9 in Shōwa Dai-Tōkyō Hyaku Zue (One Hundred Pictures of Great Tokyo in the Showa Era)

== Biography ==
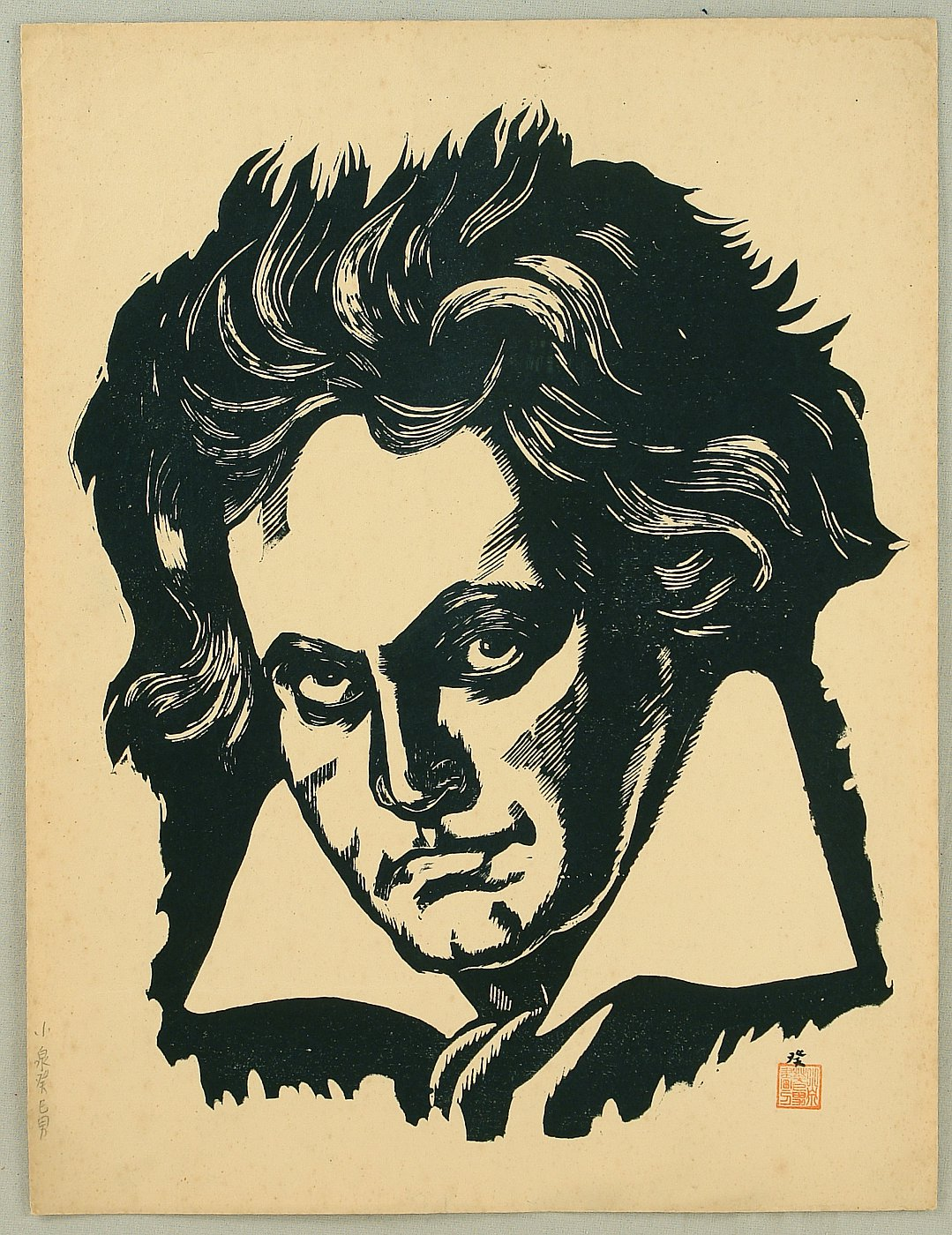
Koizumi Kishio, Portrait of Beethoven, c. 1919.

Koizumi was born in June 1893 in Shizuoka Prefecture, the fifth son of Ken'kichi Koizumi, a former samurai retainer of the Tokugawa family, which had governed Japan until the last shogun, Tokugawa Yoshinobu, resigned in 1867. After the Meiji Restoration, Ken'kichi worked as an art teacher under the name Shōtō, worked as a calligrapher, and published a calligraphy manual of his own.

Influenced by his father, who was also a calligrapher, Kishio devoted himself to art, showing clear talent by the age of sixteen. His family, recognising his evident abilities, sent him to Tokyo in 1909, where he lived with his brother-in-law, resident at the Buddhist temple Seinenji, and studied at the Nihon Suisai-ga Kenkyūjo (Japan Watercolour Institute), where Maruyama Banka, Ishii Hakutei and Oda Kazuma were his teachers.

Three years later, in 1912, he left the institute to study with Horikoshi Kankichi, the surishi (printer) who had prepared his father Ken'kichi's calligraphy manual for publication. Around the same time he also began exhibiting with the Nihon Suisai-ga Kenkyūjo, participating in thirty-five of its exhibitions between 1913 and 1935. Besides carving and printing woodblocks, Koizumi later learned copperplate printing too, rather late in life, after taking an engraving course held by Nishida, subsequently producing some prints in that medium. He earned his living with small black-and-white illustrations for newspapers and magazines, and it was in this context that he met Kogan Tobari, who worked for the same periodicals, and at whose urging he took part in founding the Sōsaku Hanga Kyōkai in 1918.

By 1914, Koizumi had begun working alongside creative print artists, such as Kogan Tobari, being recognised for his traditional carving technique-style. Koizumi joined the Japan Creative Print Association (Nihon Sosaku Hanga Kyokai) in 1919, after it had been established the year prior, participating in its first exhibition held at the Mitsukoshi department store in Nihonbashi. This is also where Koizumi first exhibited his print recreating the famous Portrait of Beethoven originally by Joseph Karl Stieler in 1820.

== Printmaking and writings ==
In 1920 he published his first series of twelve landscape prints, Shin Tokyo Fukei Hanga, with views of the eastern part of Tokyo around Asakusa. Koizumi also contributed occasional projects to art and poetry magazines such as Shi to Hanga and Hanga. He was influential on the sōsaku hanga movement above all through his carving and printing of other artists' work, including that of Kogan Tobari, but is more widely remembered for his manual Mokuhan no Horikata / Surikata, published in 1924, which he wrote at the urging of Kanae Yamamoto to explain to new artists, whether professional or amateur, how to make woodblock prints, a contribution to establishing woodblock carving and printing as a mode of personal expression. As early as 1916 he had published the article Mokuhanga ni Tsuite in the magazine Mizue.

In 1923 he published an essay in the poetry magazine Kimi to Baku, founded the previous year by Koizumi himself, together with the painter Nobuhiro Ōkōchi (1903–1967) and the poet Kenmoku Tai, in which he publicly declared his hostility toward shin-hanga, denigrating the genre as equivalent to pretty pictures that could only appeal to women and children, and suggesting that anyone who failed to appreciate sōsaku hanga should instead go and buy the works of Shinsui Ito.

Koizumi's early career took a similar path to many other creative print artists, reflecting a general departure from the ukiyo-e tradition through the twentieth century, and also the artistic response to the devastating impact of the Great Kantō Earthquake in 1923. He continued to live in Tokyo for the majority of his life. Like other modern artistic movements in Japan such as Shin-hanga or the modern print movement, the creative print movement found its initial foothold in Tokyo, before variations of the movement emerged across the Kansai region.

== Shōwa Tōkyō Hyaku Zue ==
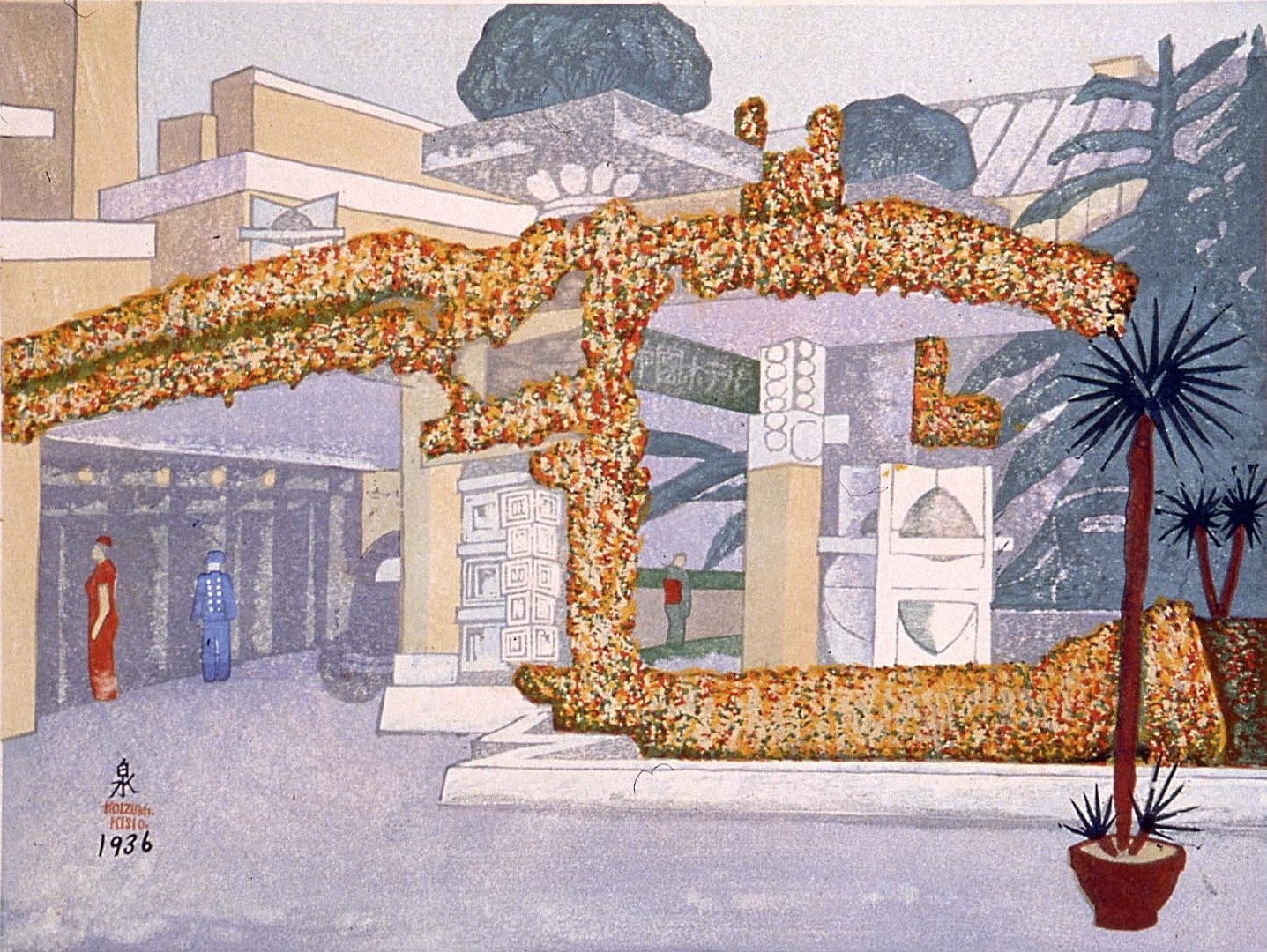
Koizumi Kishio, Teikoku hoteru no genkan (Entrance of the Imperial Hotel), No. 83 of One Hundred Pictures of Great Tokyo in the Showa Era, October 1936.

Koizumi's principal work is the Shōwa Tōkyō Hyaku Zue series, summarising the colour woodblocks of Tokyo he created between October 1928 and December 1937. Though artistically interesting only in parts, the series offers a detailed and nostalgic survey of prewar Tokyo, including a touching view of the old Teikoku Hoteru, Frank Lloyd Wright's Imperial Hotel. Inspired by great woodblock print artists such as Hokusai and Hiroshige, both of whom had dedicated series to the city when it was still known as Edo, Koizumi documented the ever-changing transformation of Tokyo, from the hardships of the 1923 Great Kantō Earthquake through the immense urban upheaval that followed.

In a separate sheet introducing the whole set, Ishii called Koizumi "the Shōwa Hiroshige"; several critics, however, have judged only some of the individual designs to be memorable, finding much of the rest of the work engagingly simple, and at times even naive.

An interesting example from the series is Haru no Ginza Yoru Kei (March 1931), in which Koizumi depicts a reborn Ginza, filled with shops, department stores, restaurants and cafés, where the bright glow of electric advertising signs and of tram and car headlights becomes a symbol of the progress and modernisation the print celebrates. The Ginza district had burned down in a devastating fire in 1872, prompting the Meiji government to subsidise the construction of fireproof brick buildings along wider, better streets lit by gaslight, so that the neighbourhood flourished as a symbol of bunka to shōmei (civilisation and enlightenment).

Koizumi's personal list of a hundred sites in the recently rebuilt Tokyo mixed popular choices with obscure and arcane selections; his highly personalised interpretations of the city, and his depictions of settings that held great meaning for him, form a pantheon of significant views, ranging from modern structures such as Haneda Airport to nostalgic depictions of venerated old temples such as Asakusa Kannon Temple, whose main hall had survived the earthquake and become a symbol of survival. Koizumi's role as a namer of new places, and as a subtle provocateur presenting politically charged suggestions in a highly traditional format, can be seen as a unique contribution to the genre of the Japanese print: through Shōwa Tōkyō Hyaku Zue, Koizumi embraced the modern spirit of his times while also preserving aspects of traditional Japanese culture, evident in his subject matter but also grounded in an established printing technique; the artist accepted the comforts of modernity while insisting on respect for the past.

Unlike a group of eight of Koizumi's contemporaries who called themselves Takujōsha or the Table Group, which in 1929 had begun working on a series of prints depicting modernising Tokyo, at around the same time in 1928 Koizumi worked independently on his series "One Hundred Pictures of Great Tokyo in the Showa Era". This stems from an artistic tradition followed on from nineteenth-century ukiyo-e artists, for example Hiroshige's One Hundred Famous Views of Edo (Meisho Edo Hyakkei). Koizumi initially completed the series of one hundred prints in 1940, before adding an additional nine prints and further annotations in the same year. Although beginning alongside each other and both considered "grand projects", the one hundred print series by Koizumi was distinctive from the series created by the Table Group and completed in 1932.

Following the Manchurian Incident in 1931, and then the outbreak of the Second Sino-Japanese War in 1937, Koizumi's prints became increasingly militarised and patriotic in tone, depicting soldiers in uniform, military parades and many Japanese flags. The prints also emphasised the Westernisation of Tokyo's transforming infrastructure, and changes in landscape and fashion. Despite the ongoing war, in 1942 Koizumi's series was exhibited in Tokyo, Osaka, and Yokohama, and it was considered successful with full editions sold through the Asahi newspaper company.

== Later years ==
Throughout his career Koizumi remained very active carving and printing his own work, chiefly landscapes, as well as that of other artists. Around 1940 he developed ideas for a series of twelve scenes of Nikkō National Park, one for each month of the year, which never saw the light of day; his intention for the series was to create viewpoints that looked back to traditional ukiyo-e approaches to the subject while retaining a contemporary mode of composition and technique. He had earlier depicted Nikkō Park in the print Nikkō Fūkei (1931), part of his Kokuritsu Kōen series.

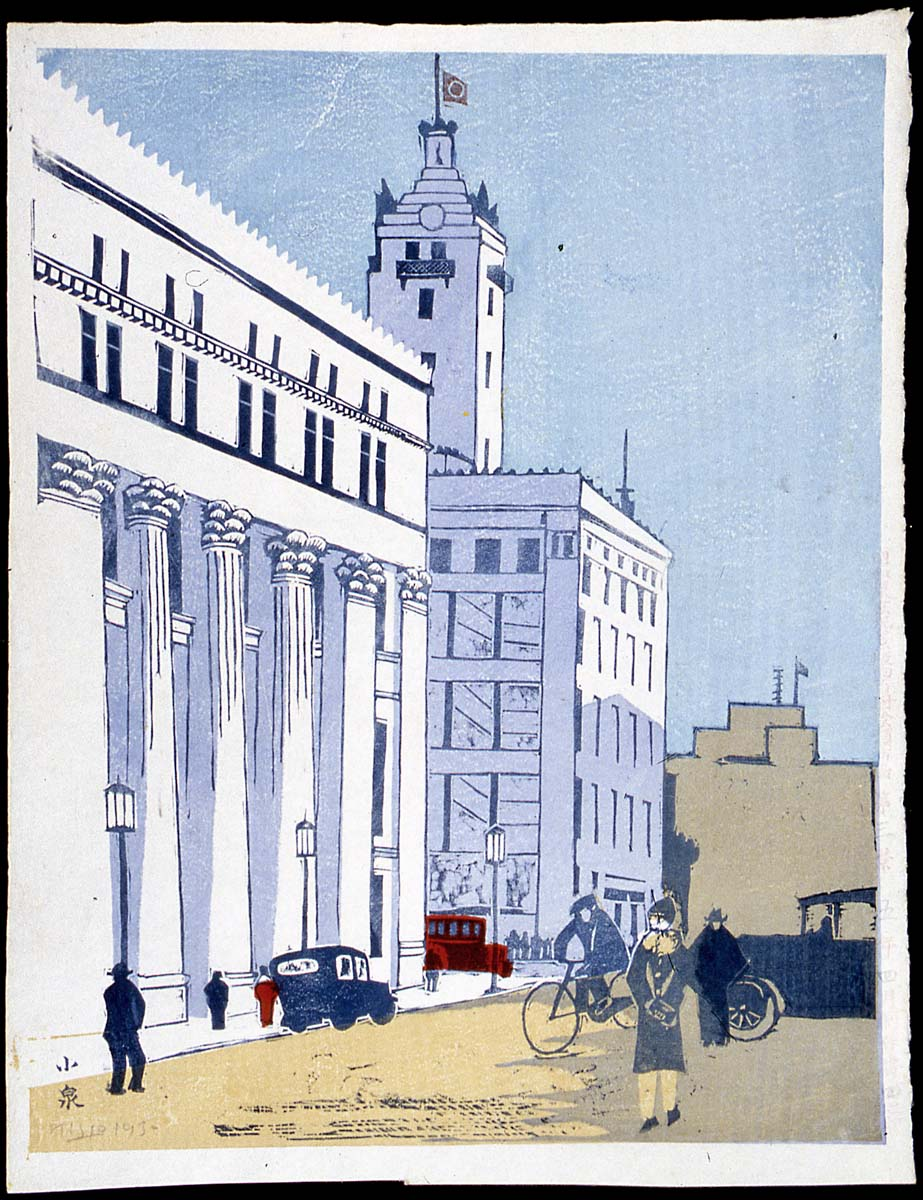
"Mitsui Bank and Mitsukoshi Department Store" from the series 100 Views of Great Tokyo in the Shōwa Era, wood block print

Due to the escalation of the Asia-Pacific War, Koizumi was soon forced to evacuate Tokyo, leaving for Saitama. Koizumi then began a new series in 1942, aspiring to offer a modern interpretation of the 36 views of Mount Fuji, in honour of Hokusai's Thirty-six Views of Mount Fuji. He completed 23 of the 36 in the next few years, but ultimately never finished the series. His health quickly declined towards the end of the war, and even though he continued to work after the surrender of Japan in August, Koizumi died at the age of 52 in December 1945, before he could return to Tokyo.

Although he may not have personally witnessed the destruction of the city, Koizumi was aware that many of the sites he had depicted in Shōwa Dai Tōkyō Hyakuzue would cease to exist. In 1946, his work was once again exhibited at the Mitsukoshi department store in Nihonbashi, where all 23 prints of his in-progress series were displayed. In 1996 the Edo-Tokyo Museum held the exhibition Tokyo in Transition, showing Koizumi's prints alongside other Tokyo series from the 1920s and 1930s to document the city's urban development over the period; his Shōwa Dai Tōkyō Hyakuzue series was also exhibited in 2020 at the Dutch museum Nihon no Hanga.
