= Chosei Kawakami =

Japanese painter

Sumio Kawakami
- 川上澄生
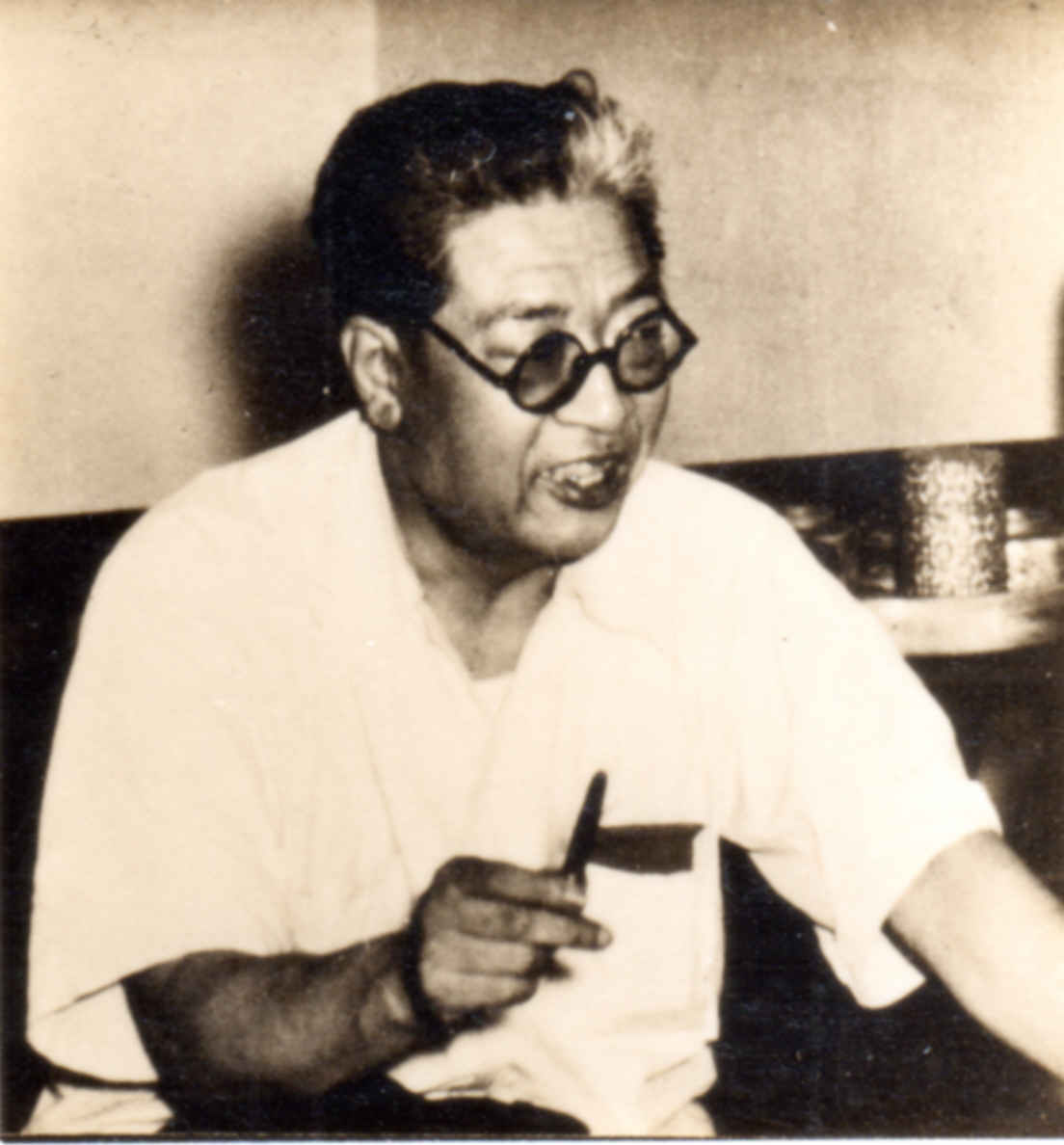
- Born: 10 April 1895; Yokohama, Japan
- Died: 1 September 1972 (aged 77); Utsunomiya, Japan
- Occupation: Painter

Chosei Kawakami (10 April 1895 – 1 September 1972) was a Japanese painter and print maker. He is better known as Sumio Kawakami (川上澄生). His work was part of the painting event in the art competition at the 1932 Summer Olympics.

== Biography ==
Kawakami was born in Yokohama, but his family moved to Tokyo when he was three. He learned to draw from Shôdai Tameshige (1863-1951) at the Aoyama Junior High School (Aoyama Gakuin Chûtôbu). He made his first print in 1912: and adaptation of a frontispiece drawn by the playwright Mokutarô Kinoshita (木下杢太郎 1885-1945) for a play called "Izumiya Dyeing Shop" (Izumiya somemono-ten: 和泉屋染物店). He was quite inventive:

To make his print — a woman with a traditional chignon hair-style who peers out from underneath a Western umbrella — Kawakami used a sharpened umbrella stay to carve the block. Moreover, he printed the inked block with a makeshift rubbing tool — an ashtray wrapped in a handkerchief.

Notwithstanding the limits of such improvised tools, the resulting image already captured what would prove to be Kawakami's lifelong theme: the curious, often amusing combination of people and objects from East and West within a single image. Kawakami was fascinated by the amusing encounters and bizarre misunderstandings that occurred when the first foreigners arrived in Japan, an interest reflected in many of his prints.

He started to submit his works to a local journals starting from 1913. His mother, Koshige (小繁), died in 1915; probably because of this event he decided to move to Canada in 1917. He spent a year in Canada and the US, working at various jobs, that included a salmon cannery in Alaska and house painting in Seattle. He returned to Japan in 1918, when he learned that his younger brother, Washirô (和四郎), was dying. In Japan he worked for a time in an export firm; in 1921 he found a position as an English teacher at Tochigi Prefectural Utsunomiya Junior High School (Utsunomiya Chûgakkô: 宇都宮中学校) in Kantô region. Kawakami's first "self-drawn, self-carved, self-printed" (jiga-jikoku-jizuri: 自画自刻自摺) book made in the "creative-print" (sôsaku hanga; 創作版画) manner was published in 1927. It was a collection of his poetry and woodcuts, titled "Bluebeard" (Aohige: 青髯). He then created more than 30 other books of woodcuts, which he mostly printed by himself.

It was during this period, teaching in his free hours, that he began to devote himself in earnest to printmaking: he became a member of several sōsaku hanga associations, exhibiting regularly with them and producing ichimai-e prints as well as the more than thirty limited-edition books, mostly self-carved and self-printed. Although he exhibited with the Nihon Hanga Kyōkai from the early 1920s, he knew relatively few print artists and was never much influenced by them. Kawakami also admired the art and poetry of Yumeji Takehisa, and befriended other sōsaku hanga artists as he discovered their work through the various art societies he joined, becoming a member of the Kokuga Sōsaku Kyōkai in 1925 and of the Nihon Sōsaku Hanga Kyōkai in 1929, and a founding member of the Nihon Hanga Kyōkai in 1931. He was also involved in the publication and management of several dōjin zasshi (coterie magazines) promoting sōsaku hanga, including Shi to Hanga, Kaze, Han Geijutsu, Shiro to Kuro and Kitsutsuki.

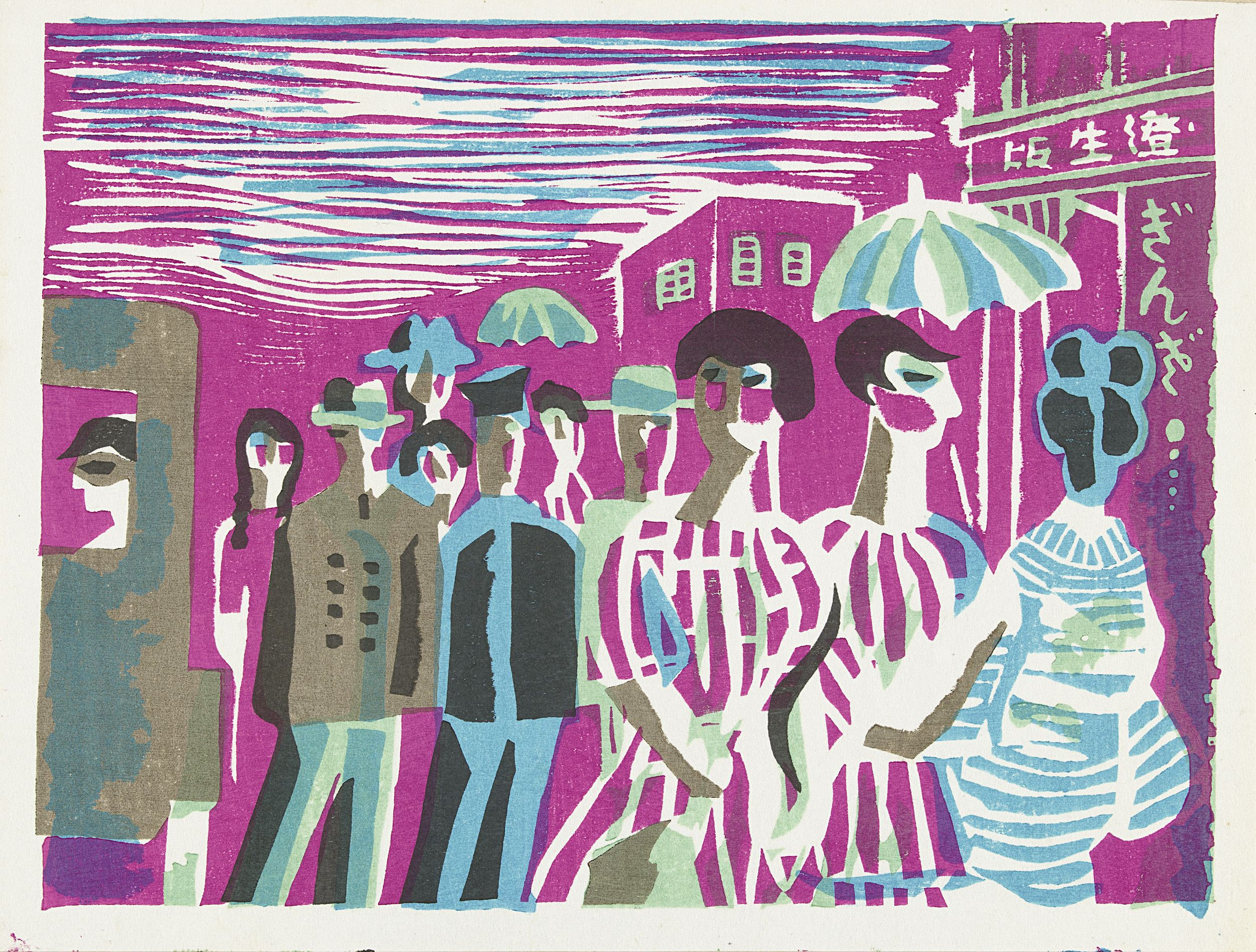
Yoru no Ginza ("Ginza at Night": 夜の銀座), part of the One Hundred Views of New Tokyo series, 1929

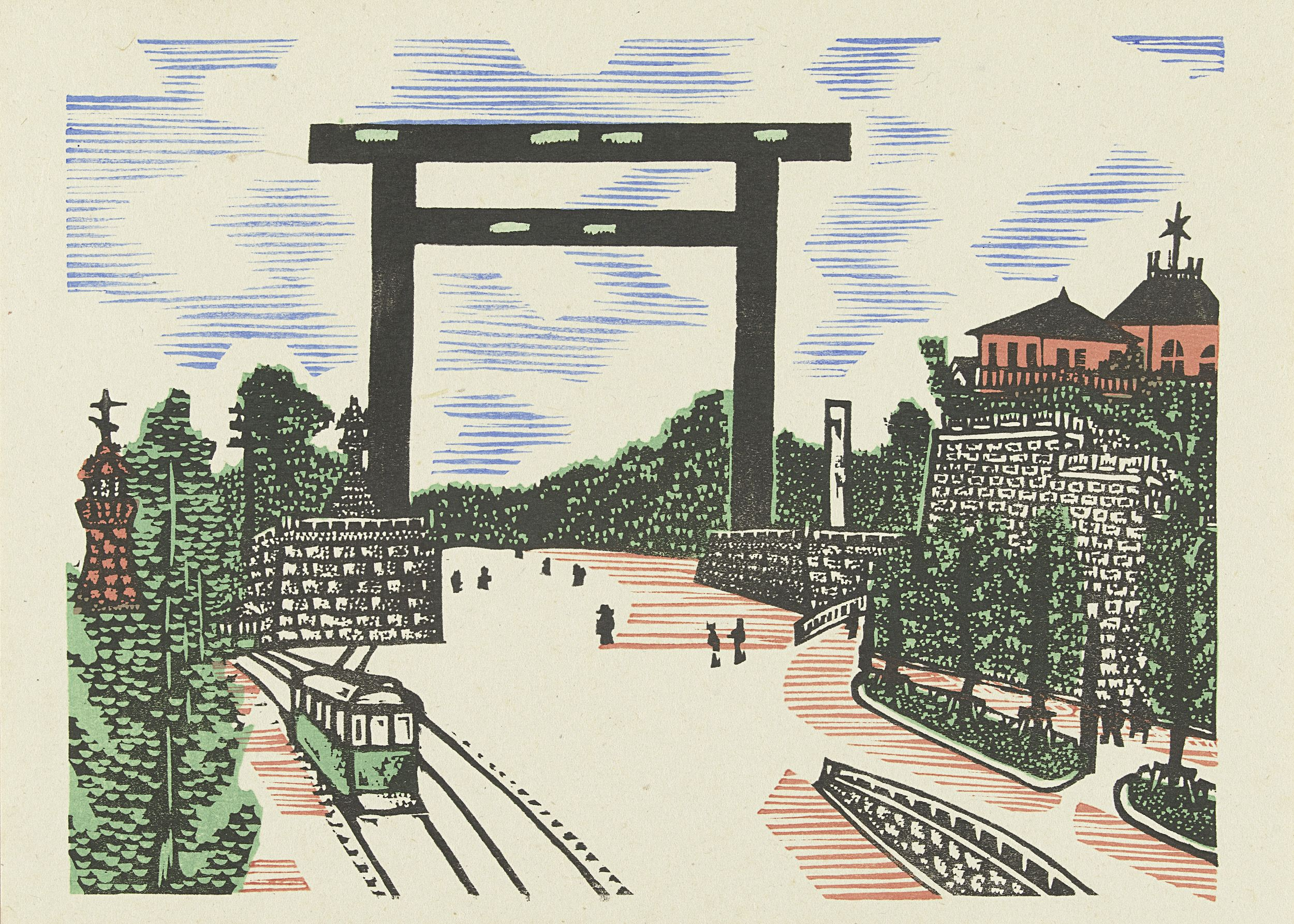
"Torii of Kudan", part of the One Hundred Views of New Tokyo, 1945

In the early years, he developed a personal movable-type method for printing the texts by carving around 800 ideographs on individual small blocks of cherry wood (sakura: 桜 or 櫻), arranging the blocks within wood frames, and printing them with a traditional round rubbing pad (baren: 馬楝), just as he would do with his woodcut images.

Kawakami said he was mostly self-taught, though he had attended an art school in his childhood. His early woodcuts were made in the usual manner, "carving multiple blocks for the outlines and colors. He then adopted a method of carving only the keyblock while brushing on colors by hand." Besides of this, he frequently visited the workshop of Gôda Kiyoshi (合田清 1862-1938), who was skilled both in traditional woodcuts European techniques. (Gôda's son, Koichi 弘一, was a classmate of Kawakami's at Aoyama Gakuin High School.)

Oliver Statler quoted Kawakami saying: "I was never much in the swim of things as far as prints were concerned. Since I didn't live in Tokyo I never knew many of the print artists and never was much influenced by them. I've just gone my own way, doing what interested me, and hoping it would interest somebody else. If it has, I'm happy."

Kawakami was against Japanese militarism; during the Second World War he lost his job as the Ministry of Education banned the teaching of English language in schools. His main income at the time was from the sale of his books. "Former students also helped out financially, but he was reduced to burning his carved blocks for firewood." Kawakami moved in March 1945 to his wife Chiyo's (千代) home in Hokkaidô (北海道), "shortly before the Allied bombings began on April 18"; Hokkaidô was serving as an evacuation area at that time. In 1949 he resumed to teach English at Utsunomiya Girls' High School. In 1951 he, together with his students, started an art magazine called "Dull Blade" (Dontô: 鈍刀).

In 1958 the Nihon Mingei Kyōkai exhibited two hundred of his works, further increasing recognition of his art. In the 1960s Kawakami finally achieved the wider, belated recognition that had long eluded him, followed by retrospective exhibitions in 1974 and 1975. Among his last prints was Tokei to Ranpu (1971), commissioned by the Hotta Corporation to commemorate the 95th anniversary of its watch shop; the print was published in collaboration with the Kokugakai on paper made by Ichibei Iwano VIII.

There is a Kawakami Sumio Graphic Art Museum in Kanuma, Tochigi prefecture (Kanuma Shiritsu Kawakami Sumio Bijutsukan: 鹿沼市立川上澄生美術館), established in 1992. The museum building was inspired by one of Kawakami's prints. There are more than 2000 works in its collection, donated Hasegawa Katsusaburô (長谷川勝三郎 1912-2001).

== Notable prints ==
One of Kawakami's first mature prints was shown at the second exhibition of the Nihon Sōsaku Hanga Kyōkai in 1920. The following year he produced the woodcut Haru no Sakaji, depicting a street in Victoria, Canada; its dotted patterns were made by carving opposing diagonals in cross-hatching, while the scalloping among the clouds and in the foreground of the street resulted from using a curved chisel to make shallow cuts. It is a simple scene, but one that reaffirms Kawakami's interest in foreign objects, people and places. The landscapes he had seen during his stay in North America continued to surface in his memory: Arasuka Unarasuka Minato (1926), published in 1924 in the inaugural volume of Hanga, depicts the harbour of Unalaska Island, an area long inhabited by the Aleut people, with a picturesque village featuring a twin-spired church, the Russian Orthodox Church of the Holy Ascension, built in 1896 and restored in 1996 with the help of the World Monuments Fund. Kawakami made the print in the traditional manner, carving a key block and separate colour blocks; the intense blue of the sky and water is immediately striking, and despite darker shading around the foreground edges of the mid-distance islands, they retain a strange, less than anchored quality, as though floating on the sea or drifting like a cloud in the sky. Many years later, in 1966, Kawakami made a somewhat nostalgic book for the Nihon Aishokai, Arusuka Monogatari, with fifteen further views of Alaska, including another view of the church.

For the collaborative gassaku series Shin Tokyo Hyakkei (1929–1932), Kawakami produced the woodcut Yoru no Ginza (1929), later reprinted in 1979 in the second volume of the Kawakami Sumio Zenshū published by Chūō Kōronsha in Tokyo.

In Nanban Buri (1955), a foreigner lies beside a courtesan, both smoking long kiseru pipes on a brass bed, a scene inspired by an incident in the life of the samurai Maeda Toshiie, a member of the Council of Five Elders and a warlord in the service of the daimyō Oda Nobunaga; the image has long fascinated collectors for its symbolic fusion of East and West through its two seductive figures, reinforced by the curious combination of a kimono-clad courtesan with a Western-style bed. Sometimes, as in the kappazuri-e Kirisuto to Oiran (1958), Kawakami went further still, not only depicting the meeting of East and West but evoking both the promise and the conflict of uniting two very different cultures; the meeting of Christ and a courtesan represents a combination of the sacred and the profane that Kawakami explored repeatedly in his work, its rendering of forms and sectioned colours stylistically recalling stained glass.

Among Kawakami's experiments was his use of materials other than paper for his prints: some woodcuts were printed on what several commentators have described as skin, as in Kyōchū no Chizu (1953), also known as Kyōochū no Chizu, which depicts nine exotic lands populated by figures in native dress, named after the yellow shapes visible on the map (Abobora, Raxa, Graça, Limbo, Domingo, São Tomé, Calix, Rosario and Un), and decorated with a nautical compass, a spouting whale, sailing ships, mermaids and angels. Kawakami, always fascinated by antique foreign artefacts, appears to have drawn inspiration from various maps drawn on parchment that he had either seen in person or found illustrated in one of the many books in his collection.
