= Suwa Kanenori =

Japanese woodblock print artist

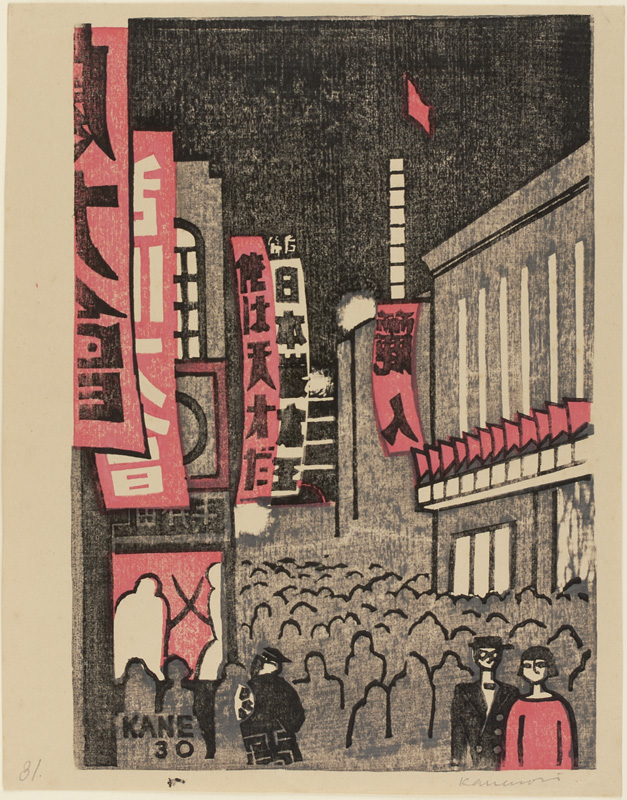
"Asakusa", from 100 Views of New Tokyo, woodblock print (1930)

Suwa Kanenori (1897–1932) was a Japanese painter and woodblock print artist associated with the sōsaku hanga ("creative print") movement.

Born 1897, he spent his youth in Kobe, and started printing from the age of sixteen. In 1914 he moved to Tokyo to study at the Hongo Painting Institute.

From 1920 his prints appeared in Yomigaeri magazine, which brought him to the attention of Un'ichi Hiratsuka, one of the leaders of sōsaku hanga movement, and Fukazawa Sakuichi whom he tutored in the craft. In 1921 he exhibited with the Sosaku Hanga Kyokai and in 1923 released his set of prints Suwa Kanenori surie awase (roughly translated as "Grinding the rough edges").

He became a member of the Nippon Sosaku Hanga Kyokai in 1928 and participated in the One Hundred Views of New Tokyo series, to which he contributed twelve prints, "notable for their spiky, stark quality." Un'ichi Hiratsuka, a friend of Suwa's who worked with him on the series, remarked that his prints had "a feeling of poetry, perhaps because he was a great poet all his life."

He worked as a designer for Shiseido, the cosmetics company, from June 1921 until his death in 1932 of appendicitis.
