= Sakuichi Fukazawa =

Japanese painter

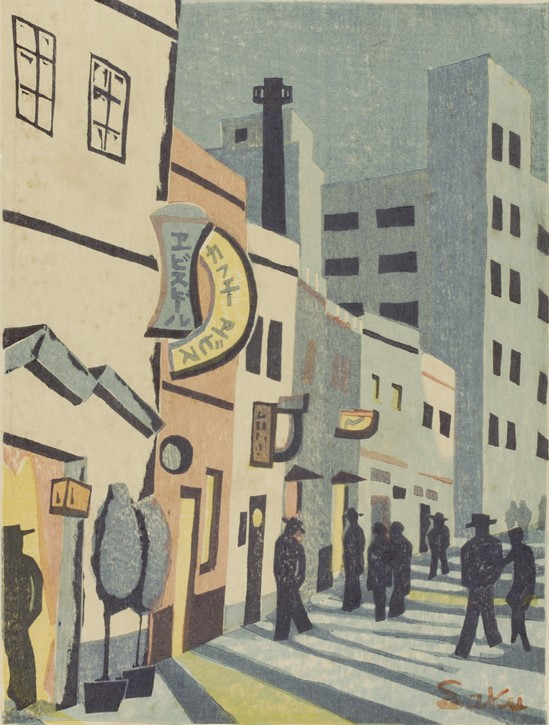
- Born: 4 September 1896; Maki, Nishikanbara, Niigata, Japan
- Died: 12 January 1947 (aged 50)
- Occupations: Painter, woodblock printer

Sakuichi Fukazawa (4 September 1896 – 12 January 1947) was a Japanese painter and woodblock printer working within the sosaku-hanga "creative prints" movement.

Fukazawa was born in Niigata Prefecture and moved to Tokyo at a young age, where he attended Tokyo Central School of Commerce and Industry. Around 1918 he learnt the art of woodblock printing under Suwa Kanenori and exhibited at the Sosaku Hanga Kyokai (Creative Print Association) in 1922. His work appeared in magazines such as 'Minato' and its successor 'Kaze'.

He was a founding member of the Nippon Hanga Kyokai (Japan Print Association) in 1931. He worked for the Han magazine alongside Hiratsuka Un'ichi, Azechi Umetarō and Munakata Shikō. He contributed thirteen prints to the series Shin Tokyo Hyakkei ("One Hundred Views of New Tokyo") which was produced from 1928 to 1932. He took part in the painting events at the 1932 and 1936 Olympic Games. From 1936 he designed woodblock-printed covers for books.

== Gallery ==
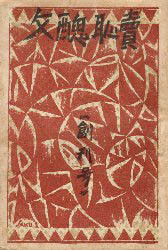
Book cover, 1939

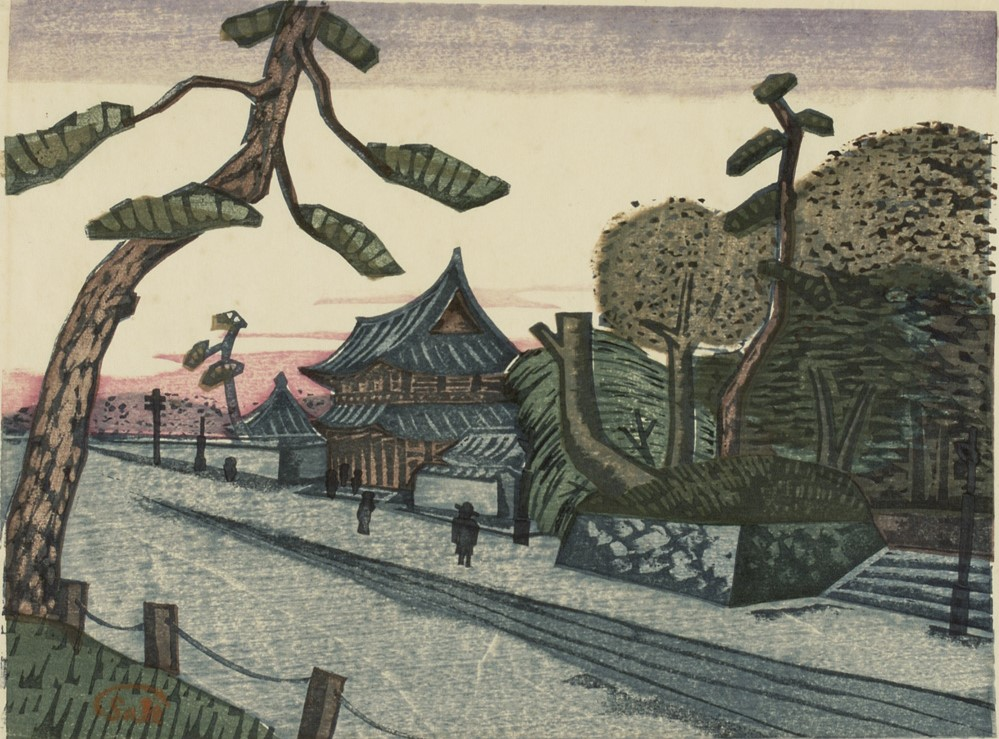
Zōjō-ji, from series: One hundred views of New Tokyo, 1929

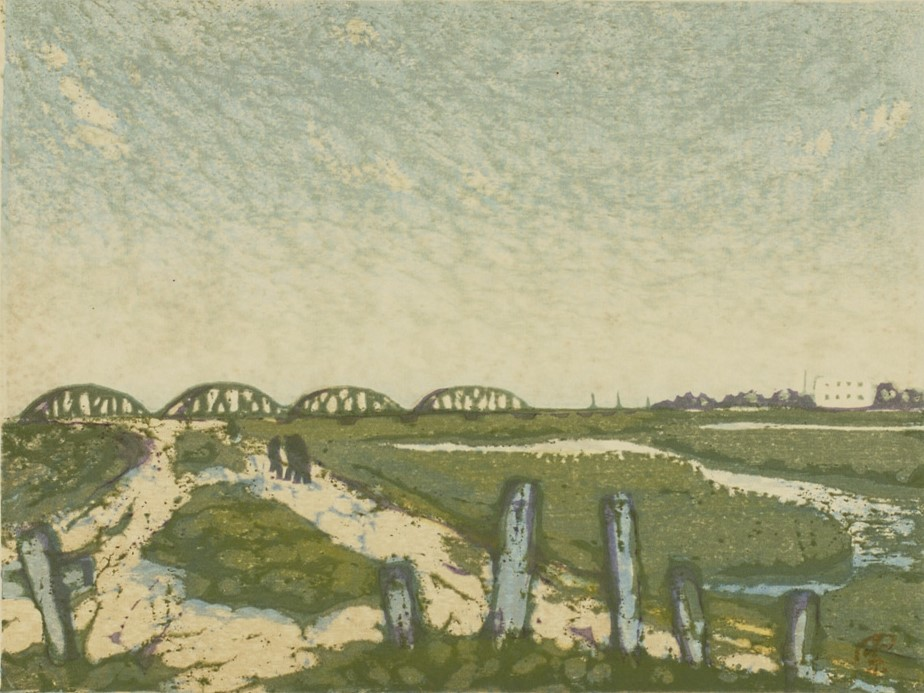
Shin Arakawa, from series: One hundred views of New Tokyo, 1930

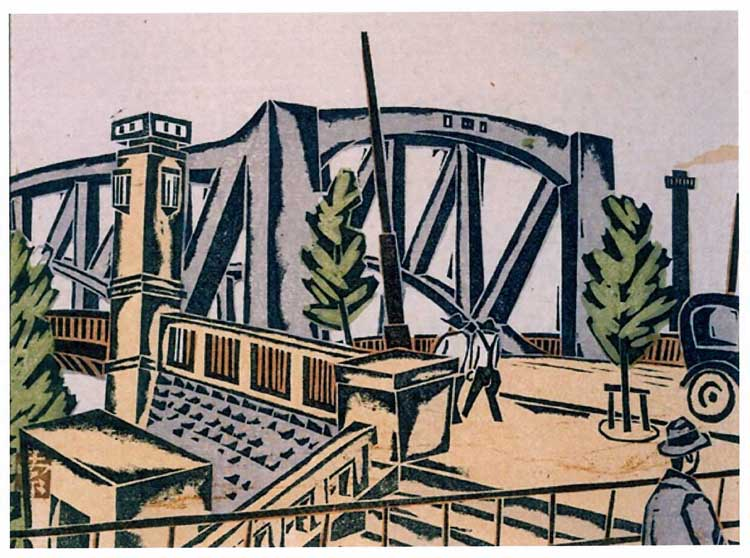
Senju-ōhashi bridge from series: One hundred views of New Tokyo, 1930

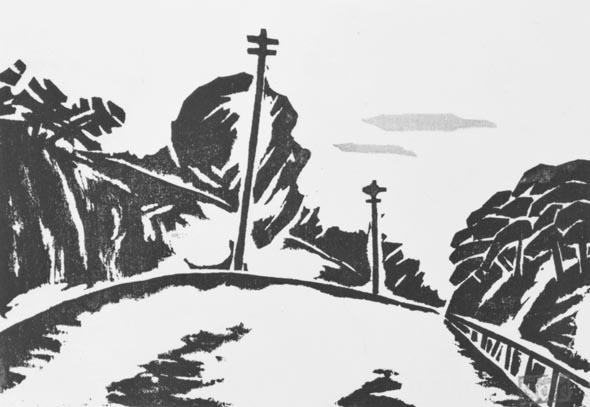
Slope at Tokyo, 1930

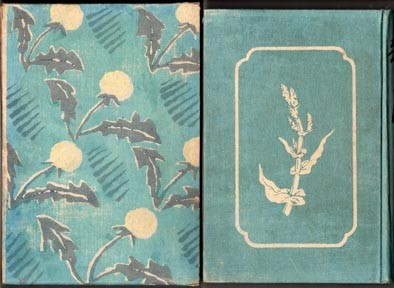
Book cover, 1939
