= Sempan village =

Village in Bangka Regency, Bangka Belitung Islands, Indonesia

Coordinates: 1°57′15″S 106°00′40″E

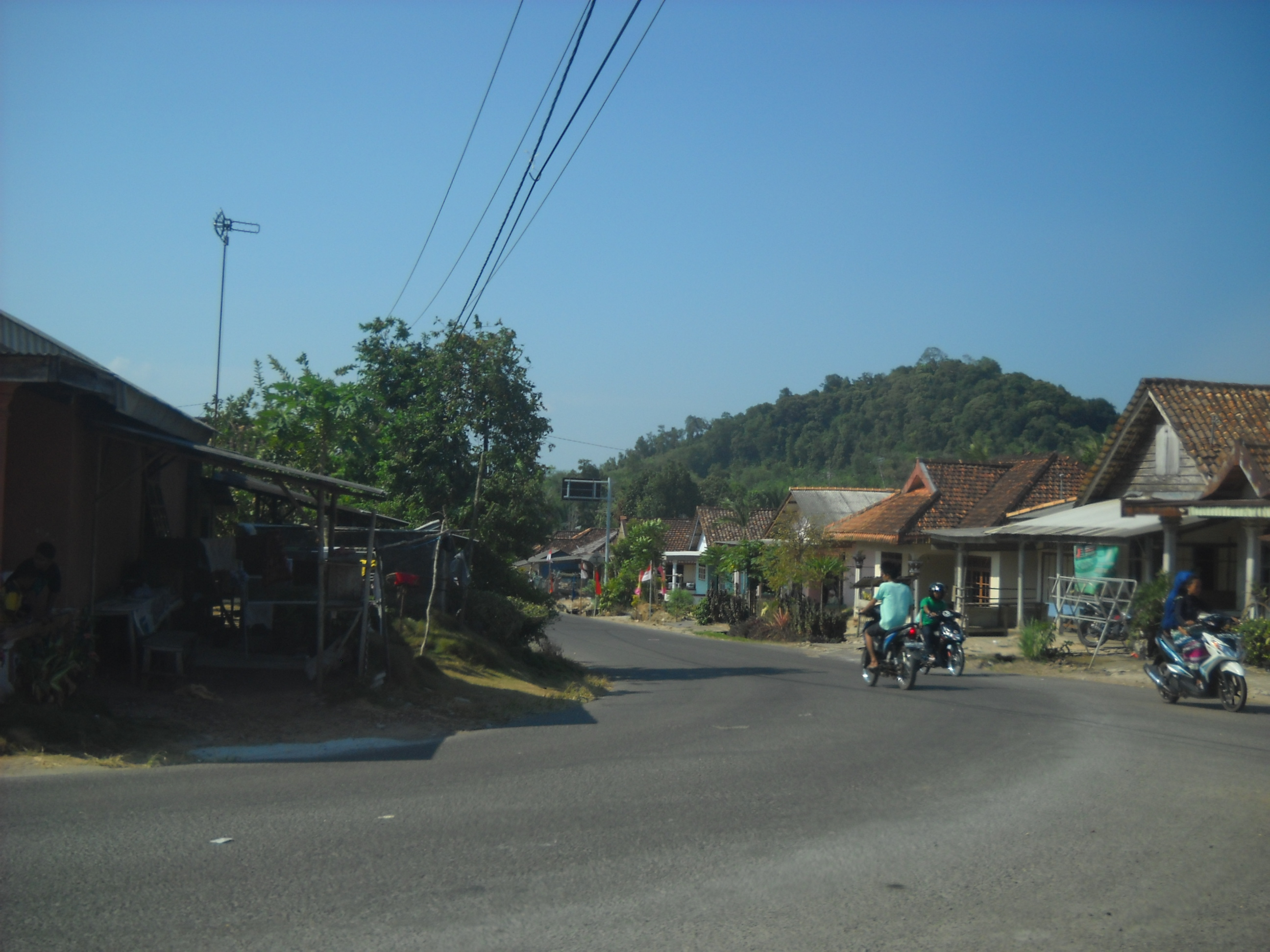
Sempan

Sempan is a village in the Pemali district, Bangka Regency, Bangka Belitung Islands, Indonesia.

According to the 2010 Indonesian census, its population was 3,288.
