= Senpan Maekawa =

Japanese painter

- Born: 5 October 1888; Kyoto, Japan
- Died: 17 November 1960 (aged 72); Shinjuku, Japan
- Occupation: woodblock printer

Senpan Maekawa (前川 千帆, Maekawa Senpan; 5 October 1888 – 17 November 1960) was a Japanese woodblock printer associated with the sosaku hanga "creative prints" movement.

== Early life ==
Born in Kyoto, his given name was Ishida Shigezaburō but from 1905 he went by Maekawa Senpan; he was the younger brother of the minor print artist Asaga Manjirō (1885–1965). He studied under Asai Chū at the Kansai Fine Art Academy. In 1911 he moved to Tokyo and became famous as a caricaturist, working for the newspapers Yomiuri Shimbun, Kokumin shinbun, and the satirical magazine Tokyo pakku. Between 1915 and 1917 he travelled in Korea; on returning to Tokyo he resumed cartooning, this time for the ‘’Yomiuri Shimbun’’'s Sunday page, where his strip ‘’Awatemono no Kumasan’’ (“Hasty Bear”), following the misadventures of a clumsy bear forever in a hurry, made his name, and his cartoons later also ran in ‘’Yomiuri Sandē Manga’’.

== Printmaking ==
Maekawa was inspired to take up woodblock printmaking by sōsaku hanga artist, Minami Kunzō (1883–1950). His first print was exhibited in 1919 at the Nippon Sōsaku Hanga Kyokai exhibition. In 1928 he joined with seven other sōsaku hanga artists to work on the 100 Views of New Tokyo series, to which he contributed twelve prints. From 1931 to 1960 he was an active member of the Japanese Print Association. n 1953 he exhibited abroad for the first time, at the São Paulo Biennial, after which he increasingly worked in larger formats.

Maekawa was largely self-taught. Although he had spent a time in his youth watching others at work and studied books that had started to be published, Maekawa admitted that for him, learning the process of printmaking was one of trial and error. He said it took him "ten years to learn technique", but that later he "got acquainted with some artisans and found they could have taught me the same things in a few hours."

In Oliver Statler's Modem Japanese Creative Prints (1955), Maekawa remarked that, "Those of us who were making prints in those first days were doing it partly in a spirit of resistance, an urge to do something the Japanese way in the face of the new passion for oil painting." In the same book, Robert Paine, Jr. of the Boston Museum of Fine Arts said that he had "best preserved a Japanese nature, a broad humaneness of subject matter." Statler thought his "warm, human approach" to printmaking probably stemmed from his earlier career as an illustrator, and said of him: "He is one of those refreshing personalities who appears to be doing, without trumpeting, exactly what he wants to do. His work has a fresh, naive style, liberally salted with a sense of humor."

== Hot Spring Notes ==
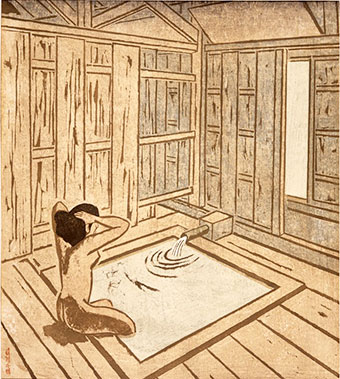
Hot Spring Bathhouse, 1949

Senpan Maekawa's most famous series of prints is the Hanga yokusen fu ("Hot Spring Notes") produced from 1941 to 1959. The series depicts a variety of onsen ("hot springs") from around Japan and was published in five volumes of twenty prints each. Helen Merritt remarks that while the subjects are depicted enjoying one their favorite pastimes of spa-going, due to Maekawa's somber colors, "the feeling is not joyous." Oliver Statler stated that the series contains "some of his pleasantest prints", and lauded Maekawa's "connoisseur's selection from the country's hundreds of hot spring resorts."

The first series, Woodblock Prints, Hot Spring Notes (版画 浴泉譜 Hanga yokusen fu), was published in 1941 by Shimo Tarō. Maekawa fell ill before the series was due so Sekino Jun'ichirō carved some of the colour blocks in his style. The edition size was 150.

More Woodblock Prints, Hot Spring Notes (続版画 浴泉譜 Zoku hanga yokusen fu), was self-published in 1944 probably due to wartime shortages. Only 40 copies were made. The next three volumes were published in 1952, 1956, and 1959 by Nihon Aishokai, the name taken by Shimo Tarō's company upon his move to Okayama prefecture.

== Olympics ==
Maekawa's work was entered in the painting events of the 1932 and 1936 Summer Olympics. He depicted rugby in the first and the long jump in the second.

== Gallery ==
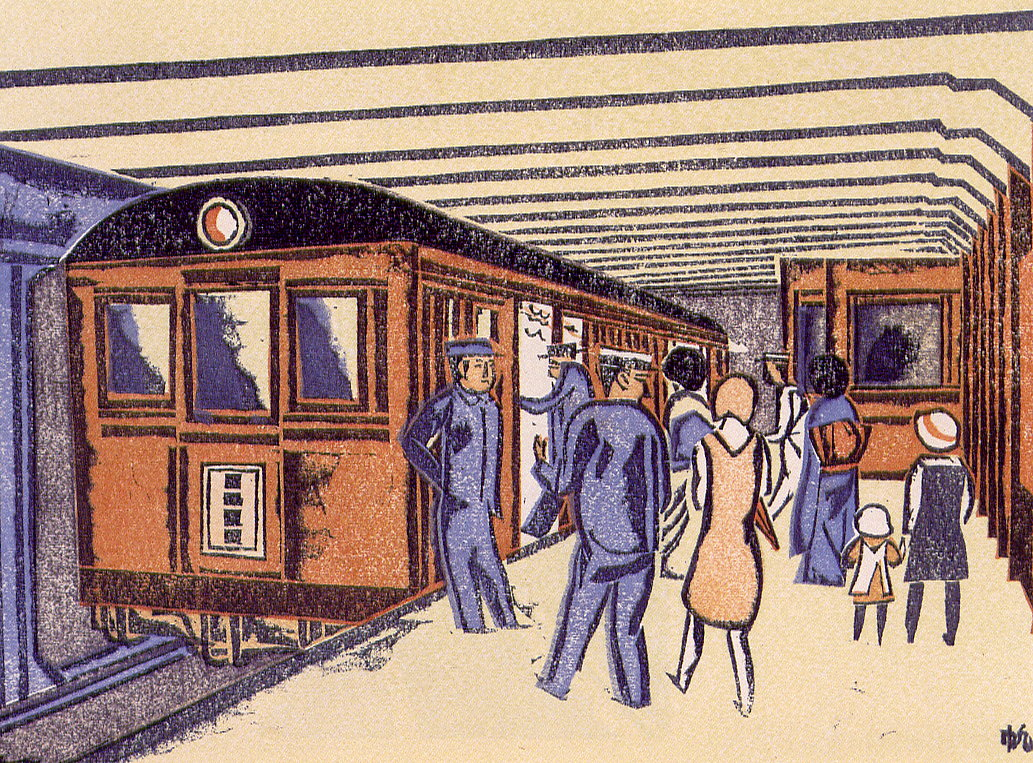
Subway from 100 Views of New Tokyo, published 1928–1932

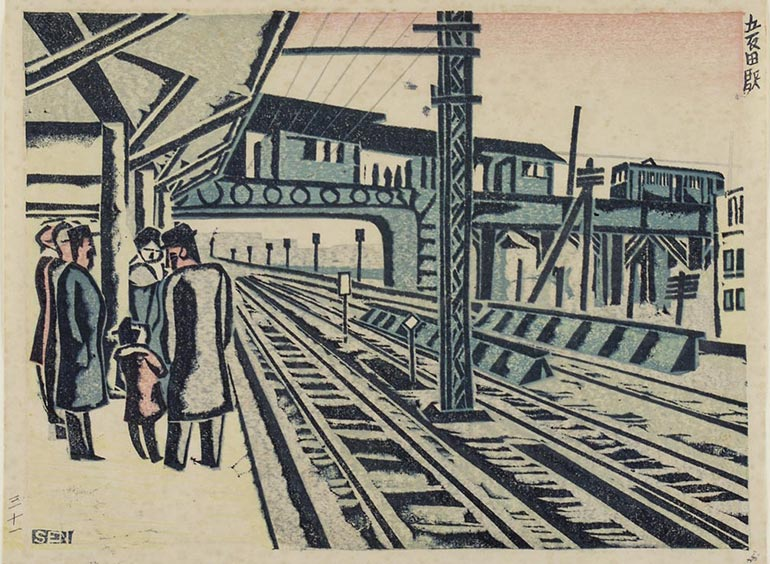
Gotanda Station from 100 Views of New Tokyo, published 1928–32

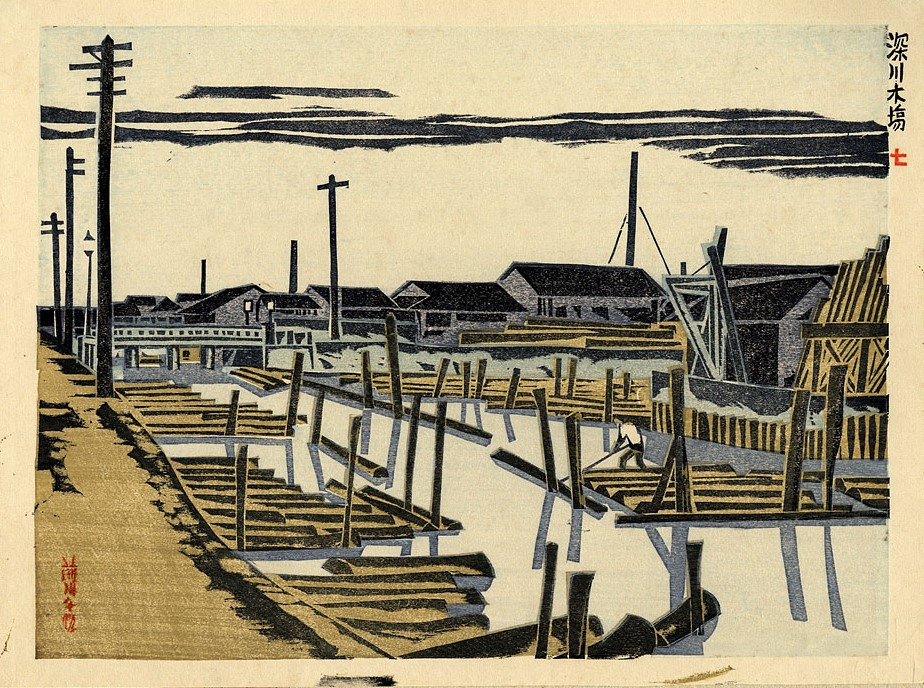
Fukagawa Lumberyards from 100 Views of New Tokyo, published 1928–32

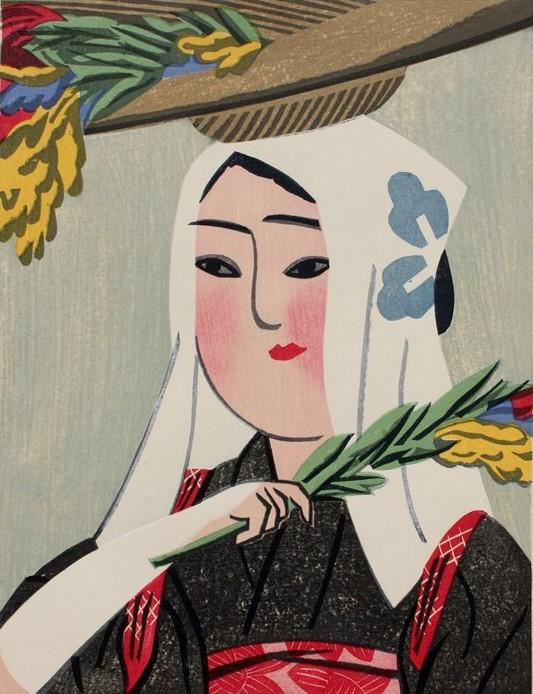
Kyoto Flower Vendor, 1951

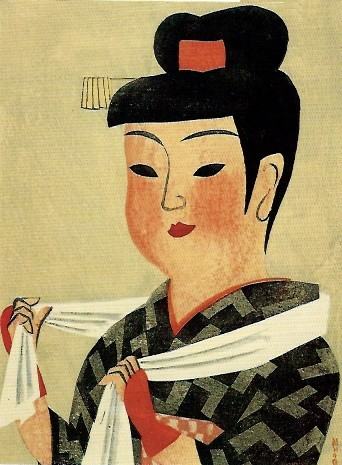
Akita Dancer, 1955
