= Ödön Márffy =

Hungarian painter (1878–1959)

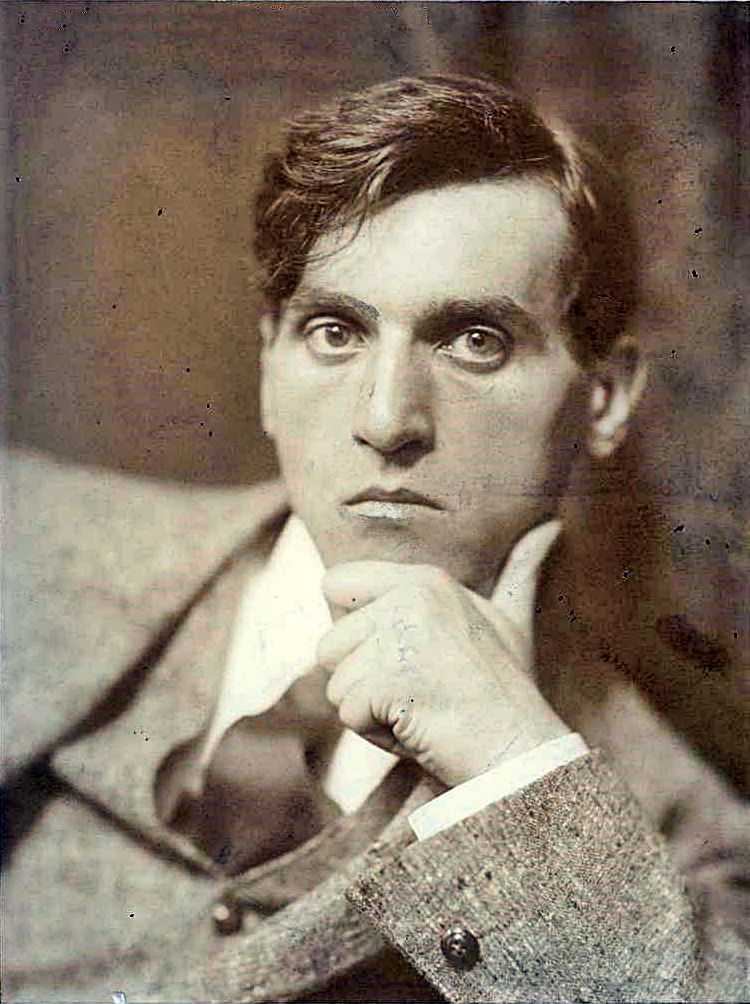
- Márffy photographed in the 1910s by Aladár Székely
- Born: Márffy Ödön; 30 November 1878; Budapest, Austria-Hungary
- Died: 3 December 1959 (aged 81); Budapest, Hungary
- Known for: Painting
- Movement: The Eight (Nyolcak), fauvism, cubism

Ödön Márffy (30 November 1878 – 3 December 1959) was a Hungarian painter, one of The Eight in Budapest, credited with bringing cubism, Fauvism and expressionism to the country.

== Biography ==
Following a short basic training, he obtained a grant to study art in Paris, from the autumn of 1902. He started as a student of Jean-Paul Laurens at the Académie Julian, as did numerous several modern-minded Hungarian painters after him, but a few months later, ostensibly for financial reasons, he transferred to the École des Beaux-Arts. There Fernand Cormon was his teacher. With classmates they often went to Ambroise Vollard's art dealership together, where Márffy was most impressed by the pictures of Paul Cézanne, Henri Matisse, Pierre Bonnard, Georges Rouault and Georges Braque. He claims to have met Matisse in 1905, who had been sent down from the École des Beaux-Arts, but would return there from time to time, and to have visited him in his studio once.

Márffy's time in Paris was crucial for his artistic development and later career, not only because he gained familiarity with French painters and students, but also of his connections with other Hungarian artists: Béla Czóbel, Róbert Berény and Bertalan Pór, later members of the Eight (Nyolcak) with him. In addition, he met the philosopher of art Lajos Fülep, the writer and critic György Bölöni, who wrote about the new art, and the poet Endre Ady, all of whom later also returned to Budapest. In 1906, the last year of his stay in France, Márffy exhibited with fauvists at the Salon d'Automne of Paris.

Back in Budapest, in March 1907, Márffy exhibited the works he made in France in the Uránia art dealership, in the company of Lajos Gulácsy, at a show that received very good reviews.

The success of this exhibition brought him the friendship of József Rippl-Rónai and Károly Kernstok. Rippl-Rónai, who had lived in France and was one of the Nabis, invited the young painter to Kaposvár. Due to his support, Márffy became a founding member of MIÉNK (Magyar Impresszionisták és Naturalisták Köre – Circle of Hungarian Impressionists and Naturalists). Károly Kernstok, a well-established painter who led The Eight, invited Márffy to his inherited property in Nyergesújfalu. There Márffy worked at art, exploring fauvism.

From late 1909, Márffy actively participated with the group of artists who seceded from the MIÉNK, and were to become famous as The Eight (A Nyolcak). Other members were Róbert Berény, Dezső Czigány, Béla Czóbel, Károly Kernstok, Dezső Orbán, Bertalan Pór and Lajos Tihanyi. They had their first exhibit together in 1909. In 1911 they held their first exhibit under the name of The Eight.

Their first exhibit opened on 30 December 1909, at the Könyves Kálmán Salon (Budapest), under the title New Pictures. Their second exhibition – already entitled The Eight – opened in April 1911 in the National Salon. While the Eight as a group had only three exhibitions in total, they were involved in all the new intellectual movements, and were part of evenings with new Hungarian literature and contemporary music. Contributors included many writers associated with the journal Nyugat (Endre Ady (d. 1919), Dezső Kosztolányi), and the music was by the most modern composers: for instance, Béla Bartók and Zoltán Kodály.

Between 1909 and 1914, Márffy's painting was constantly transforming. The exalted, fauvist brushwork gave way, in his landscapes, nudes, still lifes and portraits, to an increasingly rigorous mode of composition. The disciplined, constructivist approach would be loosened up in the second half of the decade by increasingly expressionistic solutions, thanks in part to his encounter with Oskar Kokoschka.

== Marriage and family ==
In August 1920, Márffy married the young widow Berta (Boncza) Ady, also known as "Csinszka." Her husband Endre Ady had died in 1919, after they had been married four years. The marriage brought emotional and financial security to Márffy.

== Success ==
By the 1920s, Márffy had become an acknowledged, much sought-after painter, who exhibited regularly. He could afford to travel and often went to paint in Germany and Italy, where he also took part regularly at the Venice Biennials. He exhibited internationally, including in the United States, Italy, Poland, Vienna, and Nuremberg and Munich in Germany.

The only member of the Eight to work regularly in Hungary, he had considerable authority in the local scene. Most of the other artists had emigrated after the fall of the Hungarian Democratic Republic in 1919. Orbán emigrated in 1939, with the rise in anti-Semitism and invasion of Poland.

In 1924 Márffy became a founding member of the KUT (New Society of Visual Artists), an umbrella of modern endeavours. In 1927 Márffy was elected to the head of the organization, serving for a decade.

Meanwhile, his style grew softer, more accessible, as well as airier and more decorative. His canvases long retained the fauvist colours and remnants of the constructivist space structures, and he would return to his earlier vision for the sake of the odd picture or two. By the end of the 1920s, he replaced the vibrant colours with a scumbled, misty, more relaxed atmosphere, and the style became smoother, more decorative, more palatable for a middle-class audience. The landscapes, garden and seaside scenes, nudes and still lifes he painted between the wars resemble the approach of the École de Paris painters, especially of Moïse Kisling, Jules Pascin, Van Dongen and Raoul Dufy.

After the Second World War, Márffy was among the first to join the European School, founded on 13 October 1945. His painterly style, even his views on art, were distant from the approach of the School's younger painters. They were attracted partly to the Surrealists and partly to the abstract artists; in many ways they were connected to the art of Corneille and the Cobra group.

Márffy died in the Kútvölgyi Hospital on 3 December 1959, three days after his 81st birthday.

== Exhibits ==
- 1991-1992, Standing in the Storm: The Hungarian Avant-Garde from 1908-1930, Santa Barbara Museum of Art, Santa Barbara, California
- 2006, Hungarian Fauves from Paris to Nagybánya, 1904-1914, 21 March—30 July 2006, Hungarian National Gallery

== Legacy ==
- 2010, A Nyolcak (The Eight): A Centenary Exhibition, 10 December 2010 – 27 March 2011, Janus Pannonius Museum, Pécs
- 2012, The Eight. Hungary's Highway in the Modern (Die Acht. Ungarns Highway in die Moderne), 12 September – 2 December 2012, Bank Austria Kunstforum, Vienna, collaboration with the Museum of Fine Arts and Magyar Nemzeti Galéria, Budapest.
