= Károly Kernstok =

Hungarian painter (1873–1940)

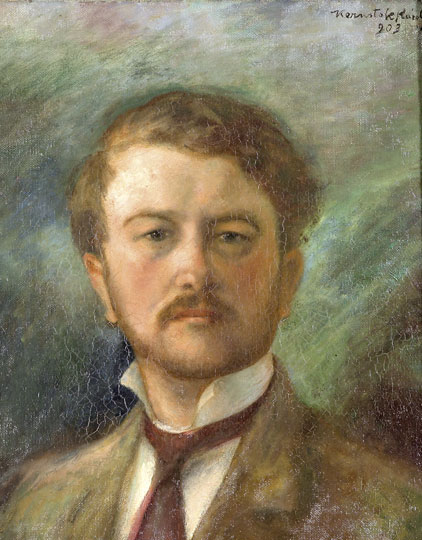
Kernstok himself (1903)

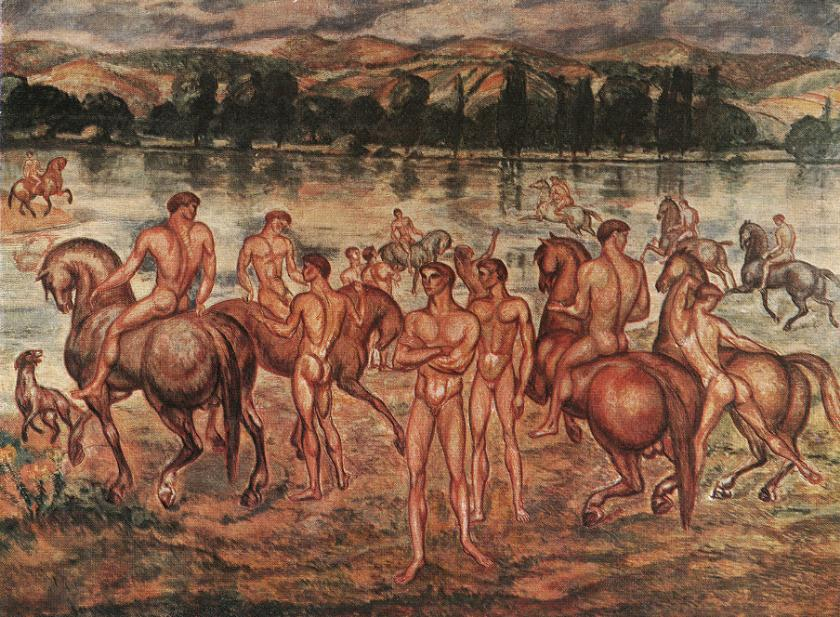
Riders at the Waterside, (1910), Hungarian National Gallery

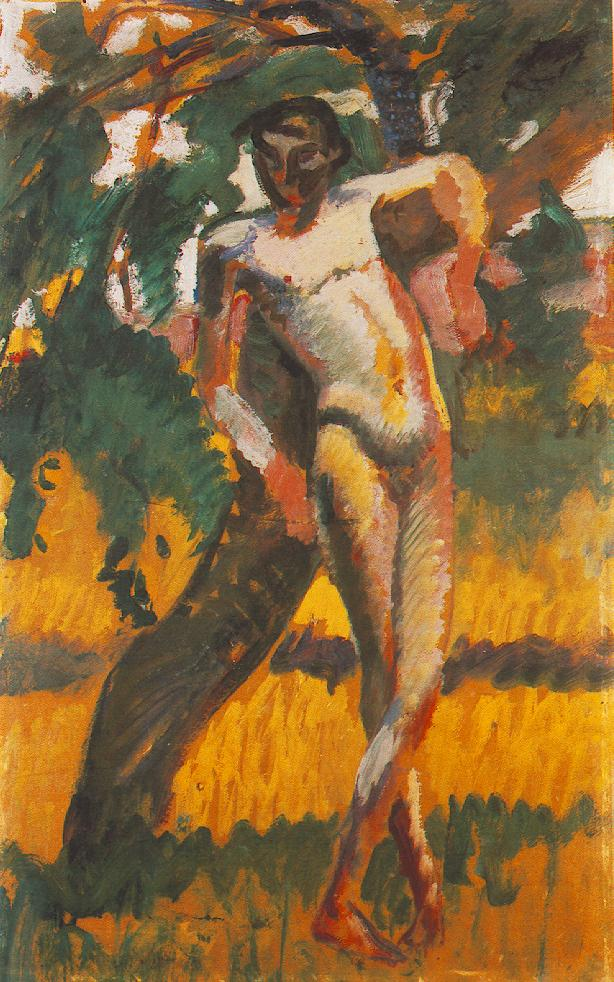
Male Nude Leaning against a Tree (1911), Hungarian National Gallery

Károly Kernstok (23 December 1873, in Budapest – 9 June 1940, in Budapest) was a Hungarian painter. In the early twentieth century, he was known for being among the leading groups of Hungarian painters known as the "Neos" and The Eight (1909–1918), before the First World War. He was particularly influenced by the work of Henri Matisse, as may be seen in his monumental painting Riders at the Waterside (1910).

Kernstok studied in Munich and Paris, and practiced as an artist mostly in Budapest. After the fall of the Hungarian Soviet Republic in 1919, he emigrated to Berlin. He lived and worked there until 1926. His work is collected in the Hungarian National Gallery, among other institutions. With the centenary of The Eight's first exhibit under that name, commemorative exhibits have been mounted in Hungary and Austria in 2011 and 2012.

== Early life and education ==
Károly Kernstok was born in 1873 in Budapest, where he lived most of his life. Attracted to art, at age 19 he went to Munich, Germany in 1892, where he studied with Simon Hollósy. From 1893 to 1896, he studied at the Académie Julian in Paris. At the time, Budapest did not have an academy of fine art.

== Career ==
After returning to Hungary in 1897, Kernstok painted the Agitátor, a picture with socialist implications. Later he painted scenes of peasant life, often in bold and glowing colours related to the Fauvist movement in France.

In 1905 he settled in Nyergesújfalu, where he had inherited an estate. He was considered a leader of the "Neos", a group of artists with radical artistic views, working against the naturalism of the Nagybánya artists' colony. Fellow "Neo" artists included Béla Czóbel, Béla Iványi-Grünwald, Vilmos Perlrott-Csaba, Lajos Tihanyi and Sándor Ziffer. Some had studied briefly at Nagybánya, but they were influenced by the French painters, particularly Paul Cézanne and Henri Matisse.

In 1906 Kernstok left Hungary a second time for Paris, where he was impressed by the style of Henri Matisse. After his return, he influenced development of the painters called The Eight (1909–1912), who included Tihanyi, Róbert Berény, Dezső Czigány, Béla Czóbel, Ödön Márffy, Dezső Orbán, and Bertalan Pór. The sculptors Márk Vedres and Vilmos Fémes Beck were also associated with them.

The Eight embraced the radical intellectual movements in the early 20th century, which was reflected in Budapest in both literature and music. They worked with such writers and composers included Endre Ady and Béla Bartók. The Eight's style was quite complex. They worked with the rationalism of cubists, the decorative use of strong color as seen in the Fauves, and the emotional depth of German Expressionism. Kernstok's "monumental painting," Riders at the Waterside (1910) shows the influence of Matisse. Bertalan Pór's Family (1909) represented another aspect of the group's work. Kernstok's Nude Male Leaning against a Tree (1911) showed the influence of the Fauvists in his use of brilliant color.

Kernstok, who had social democratic leanings, was most prominent in the cultural politics of the short-lived First Hungarian Republic, but was also entrusted with running one of the new art schools supported by the government of the 1919 Hungarian Soviet Republic. After the fall of the Soviet Republic in early August 1919, Kernstok was briefly arrested by the new Horthy regime and subsequently forced to leave the country. He emigrated to Berlin, as did many other artists. He lived and worked there until 1926. He returned to Budapest, where he remained for the rest of his life. The Last Supper (1921), an expressionist picture, was influenced by the artistic currents in Germany which he saw during his time there. He also painted some naturalist landscapes in this period.

In the last period of his life, Kernstok became interested in Etruscan painting, and completed The Rape of St. Helen (1933) and Burial (1934). He may also have seen works by the painter Pablo Picasso, who was also exploring Etruscan and classical monumentalism. Kernstok's graphic works, together with his copper engravings, are also considered significant.

In addition to his painting, Kernstok often lectured and wrote articles about art, which were published in art journals and newspapers, extending his influence. During the Soviet period in Hungary following World War II, his work was celebrated for his paintings of peasants and workers. A major retrospective exhibition of his work was held in Budapest in 1951.

== Legacy ==
In the 21st century, there has been renewed interest among curators and scholars in the early modernists in Hungary. Exhibitions in Hungary and Vienna have marked the centenary of The Eight's first exhibit under that name in 1911.

- 2011, The Eight: A Centenary Exhibition, Janus Pannonius Museum, Pécs, 10 December 2010 - 27 March 2011
- 2012, The Eight. Hungary's Highway in the Modern (Die Acht. Ungarns Highway in die Moderne), 12 September 2012 - 2 December 2012, Bank Austria Kunstforum, Vienna, collaboration with Museum of Fine Arts and Magyar Nemzeti Galéria, Budapest.

== See also ==
- Róbert Berény
- Dezső Czigány
- Béla Czóbel
- Ödön Márffy
- Dezső Orbán
- Bertalan Pór
- Lajos Tihanyi

== Gallery ==
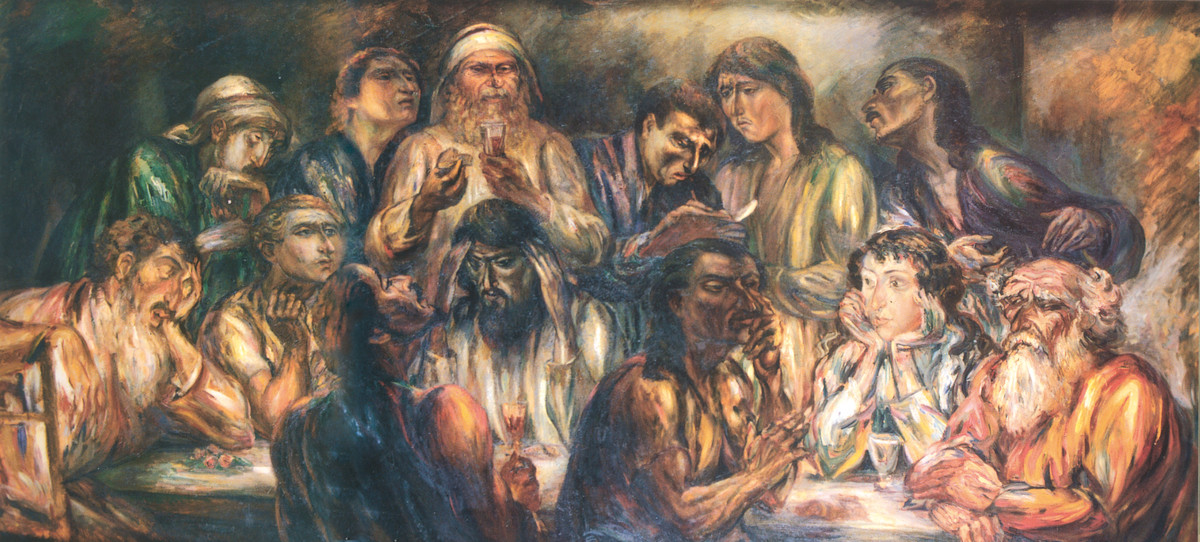
The Last Supper, 1921

== Exhibitions ==
- 1911, Művészházban
- 1917, Ernst Múzeum
- 1922, Kassai Múzeum
- 1928, Ernst Múzeum
- 1951, Károly Kernstok, Emlékkiállítás (Memorial exhibition), Fővárosi Népművelési Központ

== Works ==
- Agitátor, 1897
- Hajóvontatók, 1897
- Szilvaszedők, 1901
- Lovasok a vízparton, 1910
- Zivatar, 1919
- Szép Heléna elrablása, 1933
- Sírbatétel, 1934

== External links and sources ==
- "Károly Kernstok", Fine Arts in Hungary: from the beginning to the mid-20th century
- "Károly Kernstok", Hungarian National Gallery (in English)
