= György Gordon =

Hungarian painter (1924–2005)

- Born: June 13, 1924; Budapest
- Died: March 5, 2005 (aged 80); Wakefield
- Citizenship: Hungarian
- Occupations: painter, graphic designer

György Gordon (Budapest, 1924 June 13 – Wakefield, West Yorkshire, 2005 March 5) was a Hungarian painter and graphic artist.

== His career path ==
Before the Second World War, visited Bernáth Aurél's free school, and with them he first visited the Nagybánya Painter's Camp. Between 1945 and 1947 he lived in Bucharest, then worked in Nagybánya for half a year. Between 1948 and 1953 he was a student at the Hungarian Academy of Fine Arts, where he was taught by János Kmetty, Róbert Berény and Endre Domanovszky. He was an exhibiting artist from 1953. He emigrated in 1956; settled in England. Between 1964 and 1986 he taught at Wakefield Art College.

=== His work ===
For the short story 'A cirkusz' (1956) written by Frigyes Karinthy, he created a series of 6 linoleum engravings, which were published in a limited facsimile edition together with the sketches. His expressionist-based art, which uses gloomy, cold colors, added surrealist elements over time. He dedicated several works to the theme of suffering, loneliness, and dying. His movement studies based on careful anatomical studies and light-drenched room interiors radiate the image of timelessness. He also painted many expressive portraits and self-portraits.

== Exhibitions ==
=== Solo ===
- 1966 Wakefield, Doncaster
- 1967 Harrogate, London, Leeds
- 1971 Bradford
- 1972 Salford
- 1973 Middlesbrough, Ilkley
- 1974, 1995 Wakefield
- 1977 Budapest
- 1985, 1989 Leeds
- 1986, 1995 London
- 1995 Huddersfield, Harrogate

=== Selected, group ===
- 1953–1955, 1982 Budapest
- 1956 Szombathely
- 1982 Wakefield
- 1984 Leeds, London
- 1994 Huddersfield
