= Károly Telepy =

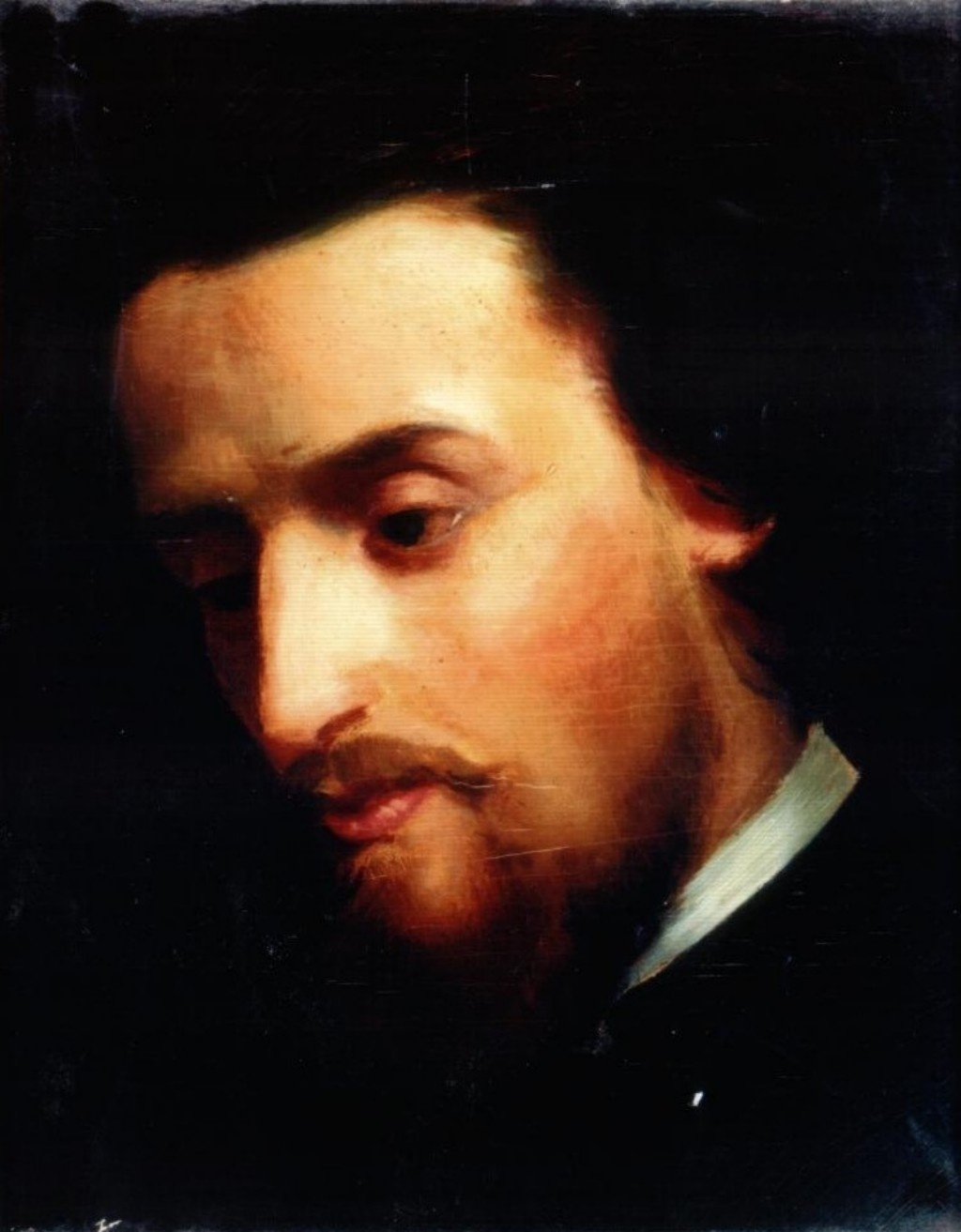
- Born: Károly Telepy; 1828; Debrecen
- Died: 1906 (aged 77–78); Budapest
- Movement: Romanticism, Academic Art

Károly Telepy (Debrecen 1828 - Budapest 1906) was a Hungarian artist with works in the collection of the Hungarian National Gallery.
