= Ervin Marton =

Hungarian photographer (1912–1968)

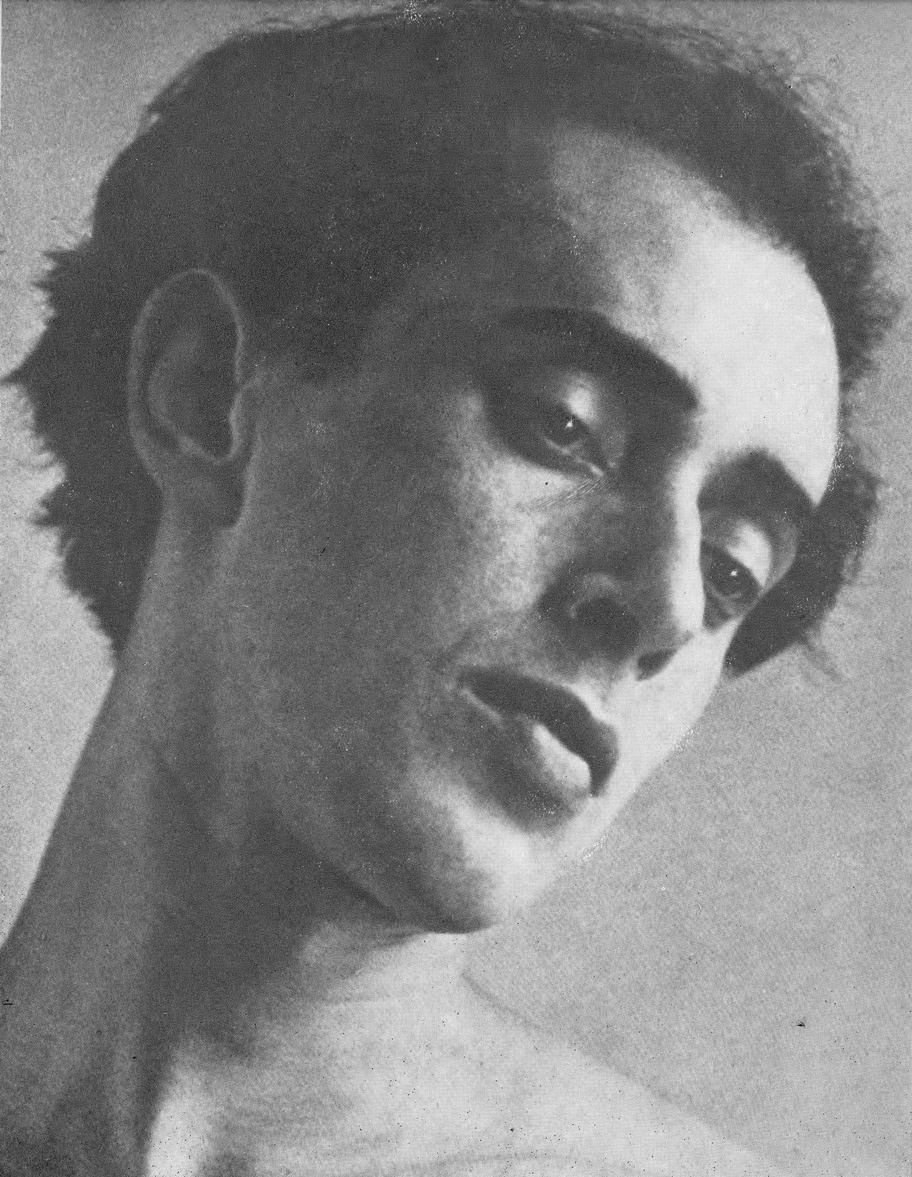
- Ervin Marton self-portrait, dancing – circa 1940 (detail)
- Born: 17 June 1912; Budapest, Hungary
- Died: 30 April 1968 (aged 55); Paris, France
- Occupations: Photographer; Artist
- Spouse: Martha Marton
- Children: Pier Marton; Yves Marton

Ervin Marton (known as Marton Ervin in Hungarian; 17 June 1912 – 30 April 1968) was a Franco-Hungarian artist and photographer who became an integral part of the Paris art culture beginning in 1937. An internationally recognized photographer, he is known for his portraits of many key figures in art, literature and the sciences working in Paris, as well as for his candid "street photography". His work was regularly exhibited in Paris during his lifetime, as well as in Budapest, London and Milan. It is held by the Hungarian National Gallery, the Bibliothèque Nationale in Paris, and the Hungarian Museum of Photography, as well as by major corporations and private collectors in Europe and the United States.

Together with numerous other Hungarians and immigrants, Marton joined the French Resistance during the Nazi occupation of Paris in World War II. Artists and intellectuals participated in projects of aiding refugees, printing clandestine communications to keep up morale, and forging passes to aid people trying to escape the Nazis. Afterwards, Marton was awarded the Médaille de la Libération (French Liberation Medal) by the French government.

Renewed interest in the Hungarian artists of 20th-century Paris has generated major 21st-century exhibits of Ervin Marton and his contemporaries. These include exhibits in Vienna, Austria (2004); and Kecskemét (2004) and Budapest, Hungary (2007 and 2010). Marton's street photography of Paris was exhibited in California (2009) together with that of the 20th-century photographers Inge Morath and Max Yavno. In 2010–2011, Marton's photos of female nudes were exhibited with those of other Hungarian artists at the Institut hongrois in Paris.

== Early life and education ==
Ervin Marton was born in Budapest, Austria-Hungary, in 1912 to István Preisz and his wife Janka Csillag, a Hungarian-Jewish couple. He had two sisters. Marton started drawing as a child; and as a teenager, he began to work in photography, although he never studied it formally.

A cousin-in-law by marriage was Lajos Tihanyi (1885–1938), one of the Hungarian artists' circle known as The Eight (Nyolcak) (1909–1918 in Budapest), who became a renowned painter and lithographer. In 1919, after the fall of the short-lived Hungarian Soviet Republic, Tihanyi emigrated to Vienna. He went on to Berlin, where he became friends with Brassaï and other younger Hungarian artists and writers. After the Hungarian and Russian revolutions, many artists and intellectuals migrated to Berlin from Eastern and Central Europe. In the early 1920s, there was a "short-lived" synthesis here of the international avant-garde with artists and intellectuals of Western Europe.

Lastly, Tihanyi emigrated to Paris in 1924, along with many other Hungarian artists,, including Brassai and André Kertész. After Ervin Marton went to Paris in 1937, Tihanyi introduced him to many of the friends in his large émigré circle.

After completing his Baccalaureate, Marton continued his studies at the Omike Drawing School in Budapest, under the artist Manó Vestróczy. He also studied at the Budapest Arts and Crafts Institute (1934–1937). During the summers from 1935 to 1937, he regularly spent time in Kalocsa, about 90 miles south of Budapest. Marton was fascinated by the Roma, whom he drew, painted and photographed there.

== Career ==
In the 1930s, Marton had his first exhibit at galleries in Budapest, when he was in his early 20s. His graphic art exhibit in 1936 at the Műterem (Studio) Gallery with Aladár Farkas (Note: Aladár Farkas became a sculptor and won the Munkácsy Award. In 1965, he produced a series of works on Vietnam. "Cultural Relations", Ministry of Foreign Affairs, Embassy of Hungary, accessed 16 November 2010.) was praised by the critic Artur Elek of the Nyugat, (Note: Artur Elek was among the important first generation of writers associated with the Nyugat (1908–1918). Mario D. Fenyo, "Literature and Political Change: Budapest, 1908–1918", in Transactions, Vol. 77, Part 6, American Philosophical Society, Philadelphia, 1987, p. 8, accessed 16 November 2010) and the writers Mária Dutka and Ödön Gerő. Edit Hoffman purchased several of Marton's works from the exhibit for what became the Hungarian National Gallery (Magyar Nemzeti Galéria). Until 1946 and his father's death, Marton frequently signed his work using his father's name Preisz as a surname (Ervin Preisz), or sometimes using Paal (Paul).

Marton became intrigued by the growing Esperanto movement and its concept that using one language would bring people together. He accepted a commission for a series of stamps that celebrated Esperantist ideals.

=== War years in Paris ===
In 1937, Marton moved to Paris, a centre for artists and writers from across Europe and a refuge for Jews suffering anti-Semitism in their native lands of Germany and eastern Europe. He became part of the vibrant circle of Hungarian émigré artists. Marton continued to study as well. He took classes in painting and sculpture at the École des Beaux-Arts.

Through his cousin, the painter Lajos Tihanyi (who died in 1938), Marton became part of an older circle of established artists and writers. He got to know the photographer Brassai and the writer György Bölöni. (Note: György Bölöni was an important journalist and writer, who had written about the Hungarian avant-garde since the early 1900s; he was part of the Hungarian émigré group in Paris through World War II. In 1945, he returned to Hungary, where he later won major awards for his works. While in Paris, he wrote a book on the poet Endre Ady, first published in 1934, with photographs by Andre Kertész. He also wrote one on Jacques de la Frégonnière. GYÖRGY BÖLÖNI, Photographs by ANDRÉ KERTÉSZ, Az Igazi Ady (The Real Ady), Budapest: Magvető, 1955, accessed 17 November 2010) (Note: Lajos Tihanyi painted portraits of Bölöni (1912) and de la Frégonnière (1933)."Tihanyi, Lajos", Terminartors, accessed 3 September 2010.) Marton also became connected to the writer Andor Németh and the painter Bertalan Pór. The latter was one of The Eight with Tihanyi in Budapest before World War I, and both men were also friends of Brassaï. Although Kertész had emigrated to New York City in 1936, he and Marton became friends during his regular trips to Europe.

After World War II started, the Germans invaded and occupied France (1940–1944). Marton was among the numerous immigrants who joined the French Resistance, working in a small group with other Hungarians and foreigners, many of them Jewish. As part of the Francs-Tireurs et Partisans – Main-d'Œuvre Immigrée (FTP-MOI) group in the Paris metropolitan area, Marton drew and distributed numerous underground flyers, which most partisan groups produced to keep up civilian morale.

In collaboration with the artist József Strémi, in the 1940s, Marton created the design for a stamp to celebrate the poet Sándor Petőfi, renowned for his role during the Hungarian Revolution of 1848. In 1954, a catalogue was published in Paris that showed the significance of the widespread, but clandestine communications by the FTP-MOI and other groups.

Marton also took part with Lajos Papp in several high-risk actions to prepare false documents for wanted persons and help them hide from the Nazis. Among those aided were a German writer and deserter, and the Hungarian artist Ferenc Varga. (A friend of Marton, Varga was the nephew of the noted novelist Zsigmond Móricz.)

Numerous young Jewish Hungarian artists and intellectuals were part of the Resistance, including the painter Sándor Józsa, sculptor István Hajdú (Etienne Hajdu), journalists László Kőrösi and Imre Gyomrai, the photographers Andras (André) Steiner and Lucien Hervé (by then a French citizen), and the printer Ladislas Mandel.

Three Hungarian Jews were part of the Manouchian Group, which became legendary in the events of the Affiche Rouge. They were captured, subjected to a show trial, convicted and executed with 18 of their comrades in 1944. The Germans distributed posters to publicize their capture, which described them as criminals; citizens used the posters as rallying symbols for the opposition, marking them "Mort pour France!" (Died for France!) after the executions of the group. Marton made a graphic image for the Phenix, an underground pamphlet published in April 1944 by the Magyar Szemle (Revue Hongroise), to commemorate the three Hungarians killed from the Manouchian Group. Jorge Semprún, a Spanish writer who also served in the Résistance, referred to Marton's group in a postwar novel about that period.

Marton was able to protect much of Tihanyi's and his own early work through the war, helped by his friendships with Brassai and Bölöni, who arranged for storage. Their support of Hungarian art continued after the war. In 1965, Kertész, Brassai and de la Frégonnière helped transfer the work of Tihanyi, Marton and other Hungarian artists to the Hungarian National Gallery, founded in 1957.

(Although Marton's parents survived The Holocaust in Budapest, they were weakened by deprivation and died of pneumonia soon after the end of the war. His two sisters were saved by Raoul Wallenberg, but the baby of one died during the war.)

== Post-war years ==
Artistic activity in Paris rapidly revived in the years after the war. From 1944 to 1946, Marton worked with Bölöni and Por in the reorganization of the Hungarian House, a cultural centre for émigré artists. The community organized their own exhibits and discussions. He was invited to participate in many group exhibits, among which in 1947 were the Surrealist Exhibitions at the Galerie Maeght. That year, he also had works in the School of Paris exhibit in London, his first showing in that city.

Marton was also featured in solo shows: in 1948, the Galerie Palmes had a retrospective of his work. The catalogue’s preface was written by Louis Cherronnet, critic for the magazine Arts, who was a supporter of Marton's work. In 1953, the Galerie St. Jacques gave Marton a solo show. In the catalogue preface, the writer Blaise Cendrars described Marton as "the ace of white and black photography."

From his work in the 1940s and 1950s, Marton is internationally known as one of the masters of street photography, capturing people in their daily lives. In 1965, he was given a solo show in Italy at the Circolo Fotografia Milanese (Photography Club Milan). In addition to photography, Marton continued to work in other art forms: painting, graphic art and sculpture.

The strong Hungarian connections within the Parisian art community continued to flourish. In the postwar years, Marton helped new artists, for instance, teaching photography techniques to the Hungarian immigrant Michael Peto and encouraging him at the beginning of his career. Peto returned to London, where he developed as an internationally known photojournalist in his own right.

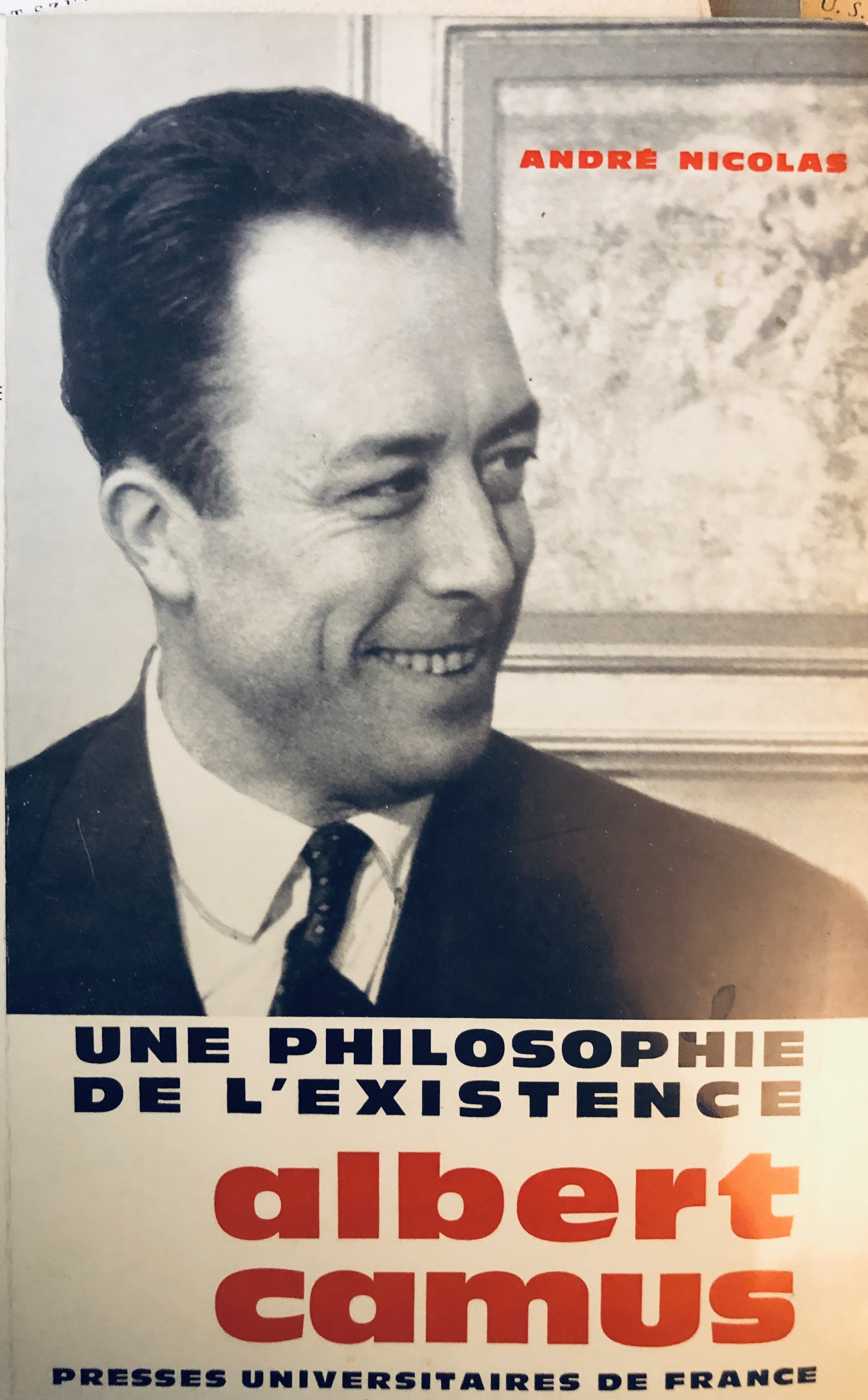
"Camus by Marton" – Cover photograph by Ervin Marton for André Nicolas, Une Philosophie de l'Existence, Albert Camus, Presses Universitaires de France, 1964.

== Marriage and family ==
After the war, Marton met his future wife, Martha Rudas, who had immigrated to Paris from Budapest. She was a descendant of Moses Sofer (the Chasam Sofer) in a long line of rabbis and their wives. During the war years, she hid in Budapest in one room with her two sisters and a baby niece. Her first husband, György Rudas, had died during the war while working in a Jewish forced labour group in Hungary.

Marton and Martha married and had two sons together. Pier is a video/new media artist, professor and writer; Yves is an anthropologist who has also taught capoeira.

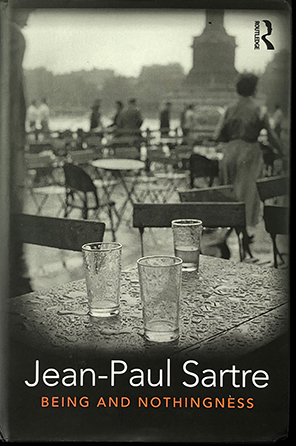
"Interrupted Conversation, Place de la Bastille, Circa 1950" – Cover photograph by Ervin Marton on Routledge's 2018 English edition of Jean-Paul Sartre's L’Être et le Néant.

== Commissions and recognition ==
Marton's artistic recognition led to many work opportunities. His photograph commissions included:

- Posters and brochures for the National French Tourist Offices;
- An album of photographs about Austria for Les Guides Bleus (Blue Guides), Paris: Hachette, 1959;
- Larousse dictionary;
- The publisher Sun for various works; and
- Photos to accompany poetry by Maurice Fombeure for a joint book on Paris, entitled Paris m’a souri (Paris smiled at me) (1959, Alpina).
- André Malraux, the French Minister of Cultural Affairs (1959–1969), often commissioned Marton for photographic projects.

During the 1940s through 1960s, a period when magazines published extended photo essays, Marton's photography was featured in such major French periodicals as Paris-Match, Regard, Lettres Françaises, and Point de Vue. His work was also published internationally in U.S. Camera and Travel (now Travel + Leisure); Photography Year-book (London), and Japanese publications. Critics praised his work in reviews appearing in Arts, Le Monde, Regard, and Le Canard Enchaîné, and on the French Radio Network. For instance, the critic Georges Besson noted his admiration in Lettres Françaises.

Marton was selected as a photographer for the art catalogue, Peintres Témoins de leur Temps (Painters Witness of their Times). In addition, his portraits of the writers and artists Jean Cocteau, Marc Chagall, Paul Léautaud, François Mauriac, and Pablo Picasso, among others, were exhibited at the Bibliothèque Nationale (National Library). These portraits, along with those of Jacques Prévert, Darius Milhaud, Albert Schweitzer, Jean Genet, Albert Camus, Charlie Chaplin, Gaston Bachelard, Yves Montand, Juliette Gréco, Leonor Fini, Tsuguharu Foujita and Marcel Jouhandeau, received critical acclaim. Today the Bibliothèque Nationale holds and conserves many of his photographs.

On 30 April 1968, Ervin Marton died suddenly of a brain haemorrhage in Paris. He was 55 years old and survived by his wife and two sons. At the time, the Hungarian National Gallery was preparing a retrospective exhibit of his work. Following his death, the curators adapted the exhibit and presented it in 1971 as an homage to Marton and a retrospective. They published the exhibition catalogue that year: Eva N. Pénzes, Ervin Marton Memorial Exhibition. In addition to his photography, the National Gallery holds one of his paintings and works in graphic art. Marton's work has been collected by the Hungarian National Gallery, the Bibliothèque Nationale, private collectors and major corporations.

Since the Hungarian Museum of Photography (Magyar Fotográfiai Múzeum) opened in 1991, it has also collected Marton's work. In 2004, the museum featured the photographer in a solo retrospective exhibit. The museum is particularly interested in the Hungarian photographers such as Marton, who made international reputations while working in other countries.

Following Marton's death, his family donated his sculpture to the Szombathely Képtár in Szombathely, Hungary. Founded in 1985, the gallery features mostly 20th-century artists and later. In 1992 it had two exhibits of Marton's photographs, 80 Eves and Afterimages.

== Legacy and honours ==
- Médaille de la Libération (French Liberation Medal)
- Marton's work has continued to be exhibited internationally and recognized for his contributions, especially for his portraits and street photography. Twenty-first-century exhibits are noted below.

== 21st century exhibits ==
- 1945 – Galerie Arts, Paris
- 1947 – School of Paris, Bussy Gallery, London
- 1947 – Surrealist exhibitions, Galerie Maeght, Paris
- 1948 – Ervin Marton: solo exhibit, Galerie Palmes, preface to catalogue by Louis Cheronnet
- 1956 – Art et Résistance, Salon d’Hiver, Paris
- 1965 – Circolo Fotografia Milanese, Italy – solo exhibit
- 1971 – Ervin Marton: Memorial Exhibition, Hungarian National Gallery. The catalogue included the following exhibits of his work:
- 1992 — Marton Ervin: 80 éves (80 Years Old), May – June; Utóképek (Afterimages), September – October 1992, Mini Galéria, Szombathely Képtár
- Jun 2004 – Ervin Marton: Life-Work Exhibition, Hungarian Museum of Photography, Kecskemét
- Nov 2004 – Double voyages: Photographies hongroises du monde entier (Hungarian Photographs of the Whole World), Collegium Hungaricum (Hungarian Cultural Institute), Vienna, Austria.
- 2007 – Paris en hongrois (Paris in Hungarian) – Maison Mai Manó, Hungarian House of Photography, Budapest.
- 2009 – 20th Century Photography: Selections from the Wachovia Securities Art Collection (now Wells Fargo Collection), Center Art Museum, Escondido, California
- 2010 – Art in Exile series: Belated Homecoming, 17 April to 15 August 2010, Holocaust Museum (HDKE), Budapest, group show of many Hungarian artists working abroad in the 20th century
- 2011 – formELLES – La femme dénudée dans la photographie hongroise, (The female nude in Hungarian photography), 5 November 2010 to 29 January 2011, Institut hongrois / Galerie Vasarely, Paris
- 2015 — Ervin Marton: Paris, the Post-War years, 14 May to 3 July 2015, Gallery Cohen, Los Angeles
- 2016 — Emeric Feher et ses amis (Emeric Feher, Stephen Deutsch, Ervin Marton et André Steiner), 2 June to 16 July 2016, Institut Hongrois, Paris, France.

== Partial listing of publications ==
- Sous la direction de Laure Beaumont Maillet, Françoise Denoyelle et Dominique Versavel, La photographie humaniste 1945–1968, Autour d'Izis, Boubat, Brassaï, Doisneau, Ronis... BnF, Bibliothèque Nationale de France, Paris, 2006
- Károly Kincses, Double voyages: photographies hongroises du monde entier, Vienna: Collegium Hungaricum, 2001 (included Ervin Marton among noted 20th-century Hungarian photographers), published in Hungarian and English
- Edith Balas, Joseph Csáky: A Pioneer of Modern Sculpture, Philadelphia, PA: American Philosophical Society, 1998, cover and frontispiece, photo by Ervin Marton; plus four of his photos inside
- Maurice Fombeure, Paris m’a souri, with photos by Ervin Marton, Paris: Alpina, 1959
- Jean Mistler, l’Autriche (Austria), with photos by Ervin Marton, Les Guides Bleus, Paris: Hachette, 1958
- Peintres Témoins de leur Temps (Painters Witness of Their Time), with photos by Ervin Marton and others, Paris
- Lucien Lorelle: "l'Esthètique du Nu", with photos by Ervin Marton, Le Monde
