= Dezső Czigány =

Hungarian painter

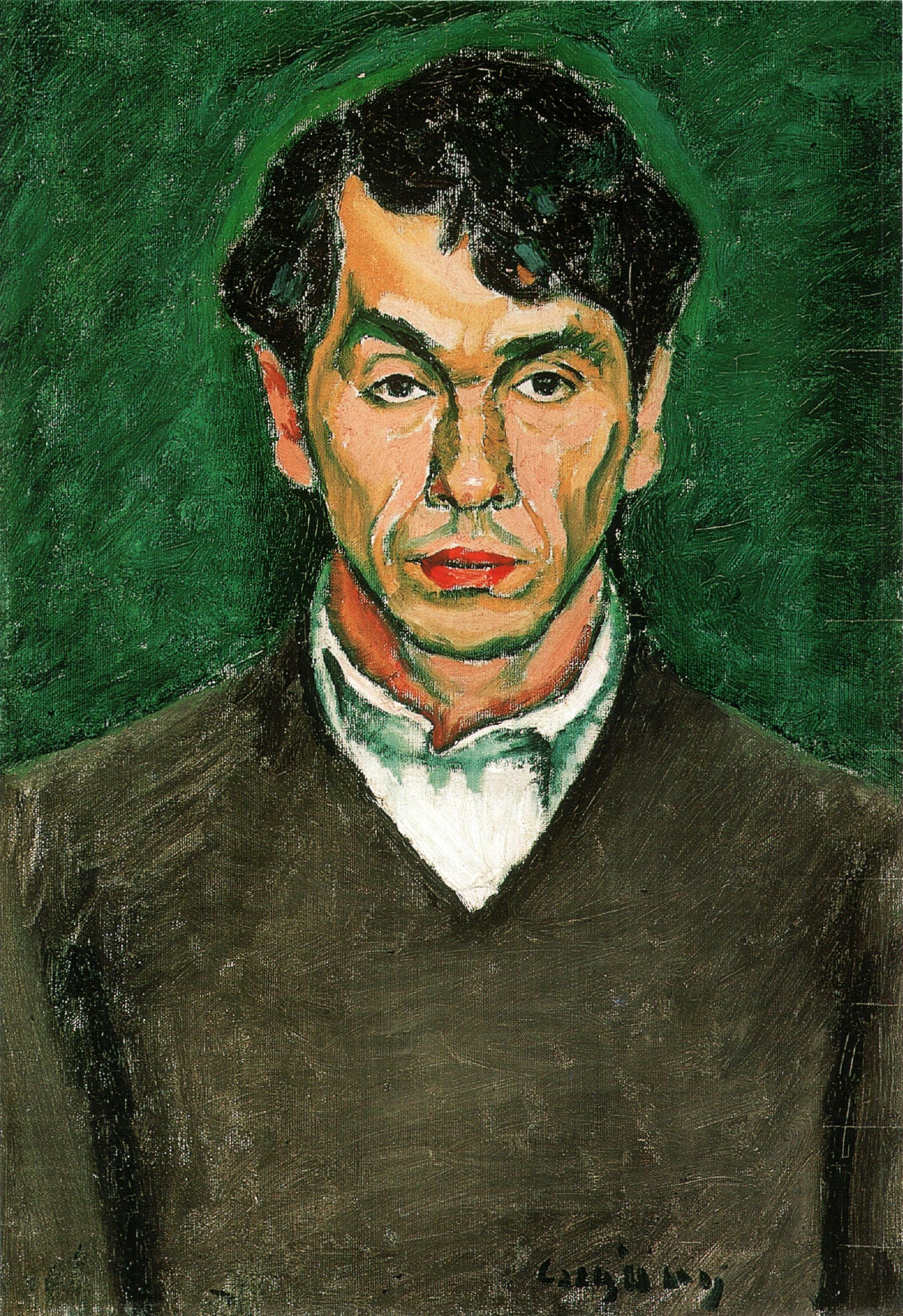
- Self-Portrait (1912)
- Born: 1 June 1883; Budapest, Austria-Hungary
- Died: 31 December 1937 (aged 54); Budapest, Hungary

Dezső Czigány (1 June 1883 – 31 December 1937) was a Hungarian painter who was born and died in Budapest. He was one of The Eight (1909–1918), who first exhibited under that name in Budapest in 1911 and were influential in introducing cubism, fauvism and expressionism into Hungarian art.

Many of them had studied at the Academy of Fine Arts, Munich, and, even more importantly, at the Académie Julian in Paris, from which they brought back leading techniques and artistic movements. They were part of the radical intellectual culture in Budapest in the early 20th century, associated with such poets as Endre Ady and composers as Béla Bartók. In 1937, Czigány killed his family and committed suicide in what was considered a psychotic breakdown.

== Early life and education ==
Dezső Czigány was born to a Jewish-Hungarian family in Budapest in 1883. As a young man, he went to Munich to study art at the Academy of Fine Arts, Munich, and also to Paris to study at the Académie Julian. In 1901 and 1903, he studied at the Nagybánya artists' colony in Hungary, at what is now Baia Mare, Romania.

== Career ==
Czigány was interested in exploring more contemporary movements in art and became one of The Eight in Budapest. Their first exhibit, called New Pictures, was in 1909, and in 1911, they opened another called The Eight. Other members included Károly Kernstok, Béla Czóbel, Róbert Berény, Ödön Márffy, Dezső Orbán, Lajos Tihanyi and Bertalan Pór. The sculptors Márk Vedres and Vilmos Fémes Beck were also associated with them.

While they had just three exhibits as a group, the painters were influential as part of the radical intellectual life in the city, and participated in related events in literature and music; they were important through 1918. Among the writers and composers involved with The Eight was Endre Ady, and Czigány was one of at least four men who painted a portrait of this pivotal figure and friend in the early 20th century. The composer Béla Bartók was also associated with these artists.

By 1914, Czigány was one of four of the group accepted for an exhibit at the Vienna Künstlerhaus, together with Márffy, Orbán, and Kernstok. The works of Berény and Tihanyi, who had embraced expressionism, were rejected as too radical.

He painted many still lifes in numerous variations. They are considered to show his quality of restraint and withdrawal, as the scholar Irén Kisdéginé Kirimi describes them as "lacking any lyrical quality."

Unlike several members of the group who left in 1919 after the fall of the Hungarian Democratic Republic, Czigány stayed in Hungary for most of his career. In his later life, he also painted numerous self-portraits, always with a serious expression on his face.

Suffering from depression, in 1937 Czigány killed his family and committed suicide.

Shortly after the end of World War II, a solo retrospective exhibition was held in Budapest to honor Czigány's art work. The opening of the Eastern Bloc in the late twentieth century has stimulated renewed interest in these artists who introduced modernist movements. In the 21st century, there have been several exhibits about the modernists: a 2004 exhibit on the Fauvists in Hungary at the Hungarian National Gallery. The centenary of The Eight's first exhibit has prompted two group shows to explore their work in 2011 and 2012 in Hungary and Austria, respectively.

== Exhibits ==
- 1991–1992, Standing in the Storm: The Hungarian Avant-Garde from 1908–1930, Santa Barbara Museum of Art, Santa Barbara, California
- 2006, Hungarian Fauves from Paris to Nagybánya, 1904–1914, 21 March—30 July 2006, Hungarian National Gallery

== Legacy ==
- 2010–2011, A Nyolcak (The Eight): A Centenary Exhibition, 10 December 2010 – 27 March 2011, Janus Pannonius Museum, Pécs
- 2012, The Eight: Hungary's Highway in the Modern (Die Acht. Ungarns Highway in die Moderne), 12 September – 2 December 2012, Bank Austria Kunstforum, Vienna, collaboration with Museum of Fine Arts and Magyar Nemzeti Galéria, Budapest.

== See also ==
- Károly Kernstok
- Róbert Berény
- Béla Czóbel
- Ödön Márffy
- Deszső Orbán
- Bertalan Pór
- Lajos Tihanyi
