= Desiderius Orban =

Hungarian painter, printmaker and teacher

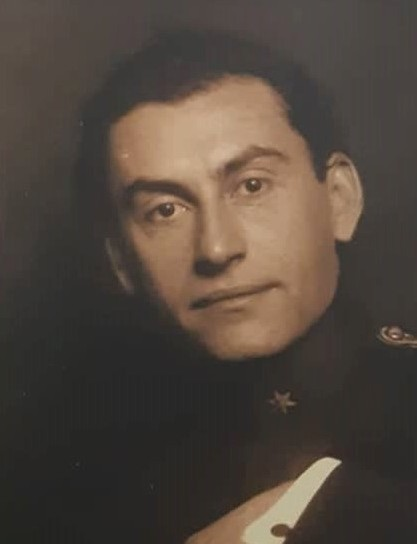

Desiderius Orban, OBE (né Orbán Dezső; 26 November 1884 – 4 October 1986) was a renowned Hungarian painter, printmaker and teacher, who, after emigrating to Australia in 1939 when in his mid-50s, also made an illustrious career in that country.

One of The Eight in Budapest, early 20th-century painters who were influential in introducing cubism, expressionism and Fauvism to Hungary, Orbán had been influenced by the paintings of Henri Matisse, Vincent van Gogh and Paul Cézanne, seen when he lived in Paris. After building a substantial career, in 1939 after the rise of Nazi Germany and the invasion of Poland, he left Hungary and emigrated to Sydney. He painted and taught for nearly another fifty years, influencing generations of students.

== Biography ==
Born Orbán Dezső to Jewish-Hungarian parents in Győr, Hungary, in 1884, he moved as a child with his family to Budapest in 1888. There he later studied art with János Pentelei Molnár. He studied philosophy, physics and mathematics at the University of Budapest. In 1905, he performed the compulsory military service with the Austro-Hungarian army.

In 1906, Orbán moved to Paris, where he studied briefly at the Académie Julian, but gave up academic training to study alone. Numerous artists from Hungary were flocking to Paris at the time.

After his return to Budapest, in 1909 Orbán joined with several other young artists known as "neos", or Keresők (The Seekers). They were taking a different direction from the older artists of the Nagybánya school, whose painters had worked at what is now Baia Mare, Romania, and first brought impressionist and post-impressionist techniques to Hungary.

At their second exhibit in 1911, the group took the name The Eight (Nyolcak); they brought contemporary painting techniques and expression from western Europe to Hungary. Other members of the group were Károly Kernstok, Béla Czóbel, Róbert Berény, Dezső Czigány, Ödön Márffy, Bertalan Pór, and Lajos Tihanyi.

In these early years, Orban came into contact with Pablo Picasso, Amedeo Modigliani and Georges Braque.

In 1912–13, he was called up again for military service in the Balkan Wars.

=== Marriage and family ===
In 1915, Orbán married Alice Vajda, a doctor serving in the army.

=== 1930s and after ===
Through the 1920s, Orbán continued to work at art. In 1931, he founded the Arts and Crafts Academy, Atelier, in Budapest. In 1937, his painting Cathedral in Eger (1928) was seized by the Nazis from the Nuremberg Museum collection as they objected to modern art; it was never recovered.

With the rise of the Nazis, anti-Semitism and Fascism, in 1939 Orbán fled Budapest around the time of the German invasion of Poland and beginning of World War II. At the age of nearly 55, he emigrated first to London.

=== Emigration to Australia ===
Orbán went on to Sydney, Australia, where he settled. He changed his first name to Desiderius. In 1942 during the war, he enlisted in the Australian Army as a private. He began his own art school. For a time, to earn a living, he worked as a spray painter in a Sydney factory. In 1944, one of his paintings was purchased by the Art Gallery of New South Wales.

From 1946 to 1949, Desiderius Orbán was President of the NSW branch of the Contemporary Art Society of Australia. In 1953, he was elected Chairman of the UNESCO National Committee of Visual Arts. From 1957 to 1967, he conducted summer schools in painting at the University of New England, Armidale.

He was a judge for the 1960 Sulman Prize at the Art Gallery of New South Wales. In 1967, and again in 1971, he won the Blake Prize for Religious Art.

His students in Australia included Harold Thornton, Yvonne Audette, Margo Lewers, John Olsen, Pat Kelk Graham, Ruth Faerber, Panni Roseth, Olive Hughes, John Coburn, Ruth Burgess, Virginia Cuppaidge, James Clifford (1936–1987), Aileen Rogers (1916–1994), Sheila McDonald, Hilary Cassidy, Mary Curtis and Tom Green (1913–1981).

Orban died in Sydney in 1986, aged 101.

A collection of Desiderius Orban-related research material is housed at Lane Cove Library in Sydney.

== Legacy ==
- in 1975, he was appointed an Officer of the Order of the British Empire (OBE) for his service to the arts.
- 1982, Orban was awarded the Gold Medal of the Order of the Hungarian Flag by the Hungarian People's Republic.

In the 21st century European museums have held major exhibits on the Hungarian modernists and marked the centenary of the first exhibit of The Eight.

- In 2006, Hungarian Fauves from Paris to Nagybánya, 1904-1914, 21 March—30 July 2006, Hungarian National Gallery
- 2010, A Nyolcak (The Eight): A Centenary Exhibition, 10 December 2010 – 27 March 2011, Janus Pannonius Museum, Pécs
- 2012, The Eight. Hungary's Highway in the Modern (Die Acht. Ungarns Highway in die Moderne), 12 September - 2 December 2012, Bank Austria Kunstforum, Vienna, collaboration with Museum of Fine Arts and Magyar Nemzeti Galéria, Budapest.

== Selected solo exhibitions ==
- 1917 Solo exhibition, Konyves Kalman Gallery, Budapest
- 1923 Helikon Gallery, Budapest
- 1924-31 Various solo exhibitions in Hungary, Romania, and Czechoslovakia
- 1943 Notanda Gallery, Sydney
- 1944 Farmer's Blaxland Gallery, Sydney
- 1946 Macquarie Galleries, Sydney; Myer Art Gallery, Melbourne
- 1950 David Jones Art Gallery, Sydney
- 1952, 59 Macquarie Galleries, Sydney
- 1955 John Martin Art Gallery, Adelaide; Bissietta Art Gallery, Sydney
- 1957 Brummels Gallery, Melbourne
- 1960 Newcastle Regional Art Gallery
- 1963 Komon Gallery, Sydney; War Memorial Gallery of Fine Arts, University of Sydney; Douglas Galleries, Brisbane; Ipswich Arts Centre, Queensland
- 1964-68 Komon Gallery, Sydney
- 1969 Retrospective, Newcastle Regional Art Gallery
- 1969 Von Bertouch Galleries, Newcastle; Holdsworth Galleries, Sydney
- 1970, 71 Toorak Art Gallery, Melbourne
- 1972 Reid Gallery, Brisbane; Holdsworth Galleries, Sydney
- 1973 Langsam Galleries, Melbourne; The Sculpture Gallery, Sydney; Reid Gallery, Brisbane; Skinner Gallery, Perth
- 1975 Retrospective, Art Gallery of New South Wales
- 1976 David Sumner Gallery, Adelaide
- 1977 Artarmon Gallery, Sydney
- 1978 Barry Stern Gallery, Sydney; Queen Street Gallery, Sydney
- 1979 Trinity Delmar Gallery, Sydney
- 1979 Masterpiece Gallery, Hobart
- 1980 New South Wales House, London
- 1981 Niagara Lane Gallery, Melbourne

== Selected group exhibitions ==
- 1909-12 Exhibited with the Keresok Group, then Nyolcak Group, in Budapest and Berlin
- 1914 Exhibition of Hungarian Artists, Vienna Künstlerhaus
- 1918 Ernst Gallery, Budapest
- 1932 Still Life Exhibition, National Salon, Budapest – Hungarian representative
- 1940 Macquarie Galleries, Sydney
- 1943 Became a regular exhibitor with the Contemporary Art Society and the Society of Artists
- 'Australia in Pictures', David Jones Art Gallery, Sydney
- 1944 'Contemporary Australian Painting', Art Gallery of New South Wales
- One Hundred and Fifty Years of Painting in Australia 1794-1944, Art Gallery of NSW
- 1945 The Herald Exhibition of 'Present Day Australian Art', Lower Town Hall, Melbourne
- 1948 Began exhibiting with The Sydney Group
- 1950 'Sydney Art Today', Finney's Gallery, Brisbane; Macquarie Galleries, Sydney
- 1951 'Jubilee Exhibition of Australian Art'
- 1952 'Australian Painting', Art Gallery of NSW; Macquarie Galleries, Sydney
- 1954 Royal Tour Exhibition, The Fellowship of Australian Artists
- 1954-56 Macquarie Galleries, Sydney
- 1956 'Contemporary Australian Painting', Pacific Loan Exhibition, Art Gallery of NSW and on board the 'SS Orcades'
- 1959 'Exposition des peintures du group Australian et Baltes', Gallerie Royale, Paris
- 1963 Australian Art Exhibition, Kuala Lumpur, Malaysia
- 1971 'Hungarian Avant Garde 1909-1930', Munich and Milan
- 1971-82 Numerous group exhibitions in Sydney, Melbourne, Brisbane, Adelaide, Hobart and Perth
- 1983 Exhibition with Lloyd Rees at Masterpiece Gallery, Hobart

== Awards ==
- 1929 Gold medal, International Exhibition in Barcelona, Spain (still life painting)
- 1957 Wagga Wagga Art Prize
- 1967 Blake Prize
- 1967 Muswellbrook Art Prize
- 1971 Blake Prize
- 1971 Wollongong Art Prize
- 1974 International Co-operation Art Award
- 1975 appointed an OBE for his service to the arts

== Collections ==
- Hungarian National Gallery, Budapest
- Municipal Art Gallery, Szeged, Hungary
- Nuremberg Museum, Germany
- National Gallery of Australia, Canberra
- Art Gallery of New South Wales, Sydney
- Art Gallery of South Australia, Adelaide
- National Gallery of Victoria, Melbourne
- Queensland Art Gallery, Brisbane
- Tasmanian Museum and Art Gallery, Hobart
- Western Australian Art Gallery, Perth
- Ballarat Fine Art Gallery, Victoria
- Benalla Art Gallery, Victoria
- Geelong Art Gallery, Victoria
- Hamilton Art Gallery, Victoria
- Horsham Regional Art Gallery, Victoria
- Mildura Arts Centre, Victoria
- Newcastle Regional Art Gallery, NSW
- Queen Victoria Museum and Art Gallery, Launceston
- University Art Gallery, University of Melbourne
- Municipal collections: Wollongong, Muswellbrook
