= Virginia Cuppaidge =

Australian artist (born 1943)

- Born: 1943 (age 82–83); Brisbane, Queensland
- Style: Abstract expressionism
- Awards: Guggenheim fellowship
- Website: virginiacuppaidge.com

Virginia Cuppaidge (born 1943) is an Australian contemporary abstract expressionist painter. She lived and worked in New York for almost five decades, before returning to live permanently in Australia. Since 1965, Cuppaidge has held more than thirty-three exhibitions in Australia, USA and Canada.

== Biography ==
Born in Brisbane, Queensland, in 1943, Cuppaidge was the middle child of Russell and Judy Cuppaidge. Her father's portrait, painted by Jon Molvig, was shortlisted for the 1959 Archibald Prize. Cuppaidge moved to Sydney and earned a Master of Fine Art degree from the Mary White School of Art. She lived in New York from 1968 until returning to Australia in 2017 and settled in Newcastle, New South Wales.

== Early career ==
Influenced from a young age by her mother, a botanical painter with an interest in textiles, Cuppaidge dabbled with textiles in the 1960s but soon became interested in painting. She studied in Sydney with Desiderius Orban, Stanislaus Rapotec, Marea Gazzard, John Olsen and Robert Klippel before moving to New York in 1969. Arriving in New York, she called the only contact she had, Australian sculptor Clement Meadmore. They became a couple that year, and Meadmore found Cuppaidge a studio where she began to work on her large-scale geometric abstractions.

== Artistic Development ==
Cuppaidge's first solo show was in 1973 at A. M. Sachs Gallery in New York. Her work impressed the New York art critic Clement Greenberg, who commented on Cuppaidge's "sophisticated maturity". In 1974 Cuppaidge returned to Australia with a body of work which was exhibited at Gallery A in Sydney. The Bulletin referred to her work as 'handsome, no compromise works' in a horizontal format and the arts writer was impressed with Cuppaidge's 'boldness of conception'.

Cuppaidge was awarded a Guggenheim Fellowship in 1976. Cuppaidge did not entirely remove herself from her Australian roots, successfully applying for an Australia Council grant to assist with studio costs in New York.

During her years living in New York, Cuppaidge exhibits regularly in both the United States and Australia. In 1993 she exhibited with fellow ex-patriate Australian artist Judith Cotton at the Wagner Gallery in Hong Kong.

Her work is held by the National Gallery of Australia; Art Gallery of New South Wales; Art Gallery of Western Australia; Australian Consulate General, New York; Jazz Museum in Harlem, New York; Australian Embassies; Chase Manhattan Bank, New York City; Neuberger Museum, NY; Whitney Communications, New York City; Westpac Bank, New York City.

Georffrey de Groen interviewed Cuppaidge for his Oral History Collection at the National Library of Australia in 1976.

== Oral History ==
An oral history with Cuppaidge recorded in 1976 is accessible through the National Library of Australia.
