= Béla Czóbel =

Hungarian painter (1883–1976)

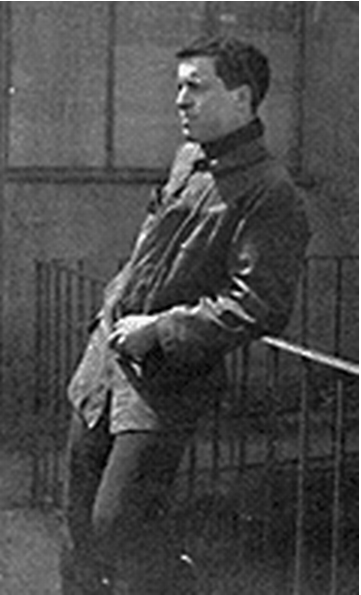
- Born: September 4, 1883; Budapest, Austria-Hungary
- Died: January 30, 1976 (aged 92); Budapest, Hungary
- Education: Nagybánya free school Académie Julian
- Known for: Painting
- Style: Fauvism, Expressionism, Naturalism
- Movement: The Eight (A Nyolcak), Berlin Secession
- Spouse: Mária Modok
- Relatives: Anna Czóbel (niece)

Béla Czóbel (4 September 1883 – 30 January 1976) was a Hungarian painter, known for his association with The Eight in the early 20th century in Budapest. They were known for introducing Post-Impressionist styles into Hungary, in addition to Fauvism, Cubism and Expressionism.

== Biography ==
Béla Czóbel was born to a Jewish-Hungarian family in Budapest in 1883. He became a student of Béla Iványi-Grünwald in the Nagybánya free school, held in an artists' colony in what is now Baia Mare, Romania. In 1902, he went to Munich to study, where he became friends with Jules Pascin, Rudolf Levy and Walter Bondy. In 1904, like many other young artists from Hungary, he went to Paris for additional study; he attended the Académie Julian as a pupil of Jean Paul Laurens.

His style at first reflected the principles of naturalism of the Nagybánya school. After meeting painters of the Fauves group in 1905 in Paris and seeing their work at the influential Salon d'Automne exhibit that year, he began to incorporate strong colors into his works.

Béla Czóbel, Portrait de Femme, c. 1908-09. Reproduced in Gelett Burgess, The Wild Men of Paris, Architectural Record, May 1910

Returning to Budapest, Czóbel joined other young painters first known as the "Neos", for striking out in directions different from the Nagybánya traditions. By 1909 they organized as The Eight. They had their first exhibit, New Pictures, that year, their first as The Eight in 1911. The members included the leader Károly Kernstok, Róbert Berény, Dezső Czigány, Ödön Márffy, Dezső Orbán, Bertalan Pór, and Lajos Tihanyi.

Czóbel was interviewed by Gelett Burgess, prior to the publication of The Wild Men of Paris, in Architectural Record, May 1910. A painting by Czóbel, Portrait de Femme, and a photograph of the artist were reproduced in the publication, along with a text about the artists work.

During the First World War, Czóbel went to the Netherlands, where he continued to work in fauvist style. He also spent time in Berlin, where he became part of the New Secession movement.

From 1925-1939, Czóbel settled in Paris, where he had a studio in Montparnasse. In 1940, he married the artist Mária Modok. After the war, he exhibited and worked both in Budapest and Paris. He finally returned to Hungary for good in 1965.

His niece, Anna Czóbel, became a well-known cinematographer.

== Exhibits ==
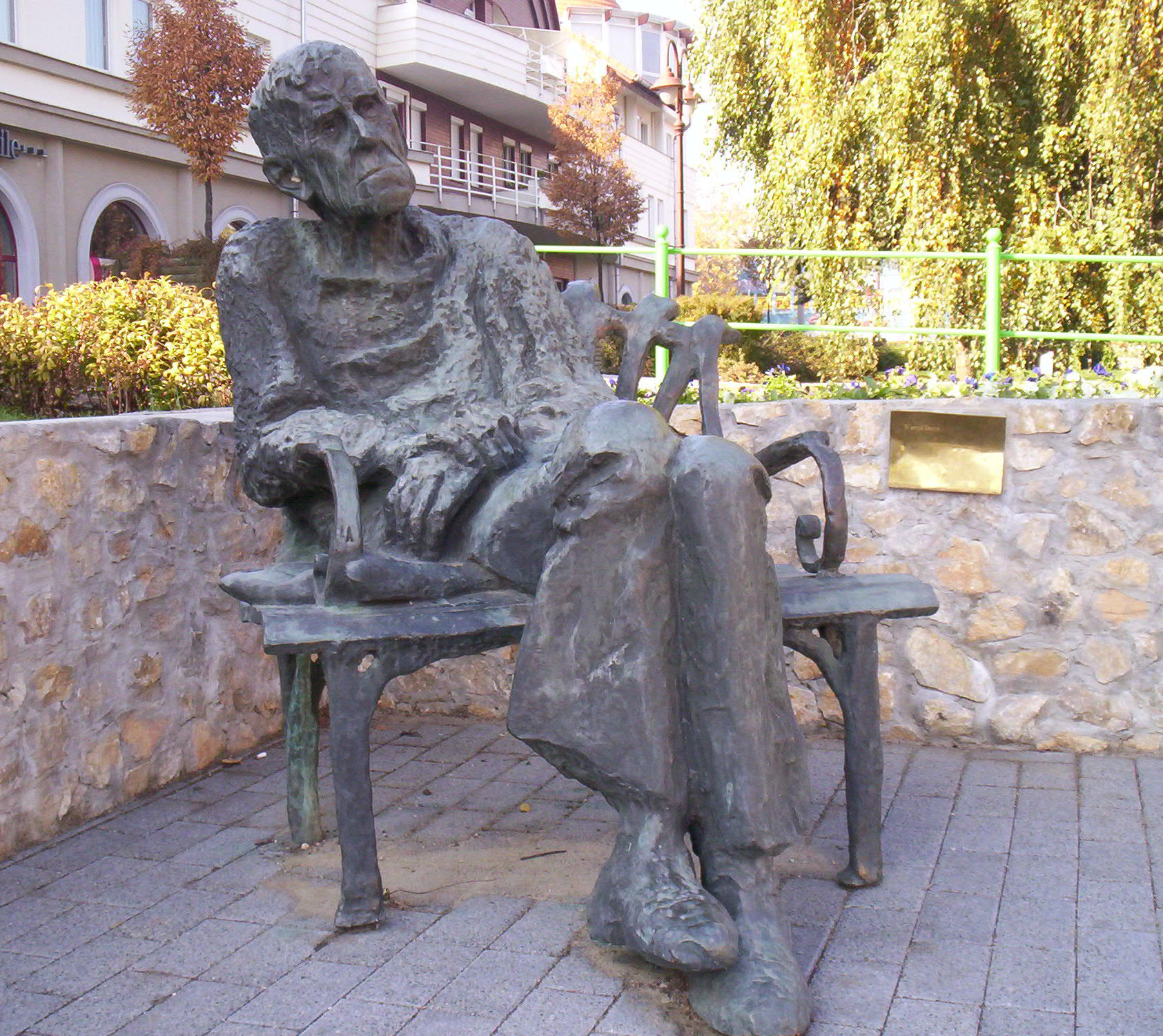
Statue of Béla Czóbel by Imre Varga, Siófok, Hungary

- 1991-1992, Standing in the Storm: The Hungarian Avant-Garde from 1908-1930, Santa Barbara Museum of Art, Santa Barbara, California

== Legacy ==
Major 21st-century exhibits in Europe have commemorated the Fauvists and the influence of The Eight in Hungary.

- 2006, Hungarian Fauves from Paris to Nagybánya, 1904-1914, 21 March—30 July 2006, Hungarian National Gallery
- 2010, A Nyolcak (The Eight): A Centenary Exhibition, 10 December 2010 - 27 March 2011, Janus Pannonius Museum, Pécs
- 2012, The Eight. Hungary's Highway in the Modern (Die Acht. Ungarns Highway in die Moderne), 12 September - 2 December 2012, Bank Austria Kunstforum, Wien, collaboration with Museum of Fine Arts and Magyar Nemzeti Galéria, Budapest.
- Béla Czóbel Museum was established in Szentendre, Hungary, where he often worked.
