= Brassaï =

Hungarian-French photographer

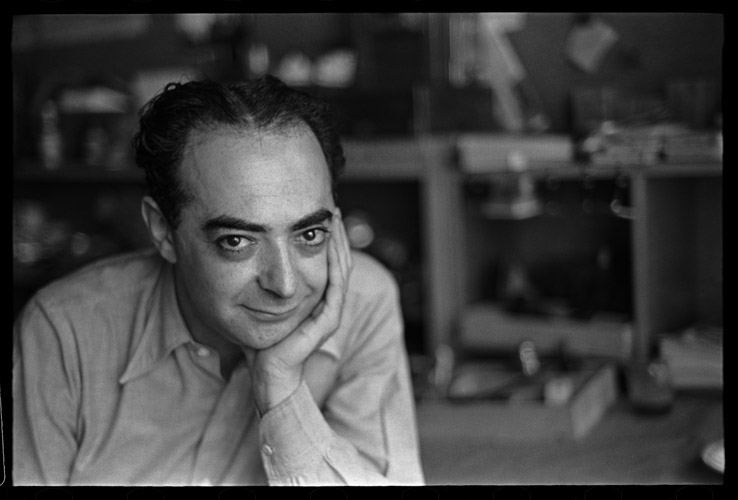
- Brassaï in 1936, photo by Emiel van Moerkerken
- Born: Gyula Halász; 9 September 1899; Brassó, Transylvania, Kingdom of Hungary, Austria-Hungary (today Brașov, Romania)
- Died: 8 July 1984 (aged 84); Beaulieu-sur-Mer, France
- Education: Hungarian Academy of Fine Arts
- Occupations: Photographer, writer, sculptor and painter
- Spouse: Gilberte-Mercédès Boyer (m. 1948)

Brassaï (French: [bʁasaj]; pseudonym of Gyula Halász, Hungarian: [ˈɟulɒ ˈhɒlaːs]; 9 September 1899 – 8 July 1984) was a Hungarian–French photographer, sculptor, medalist, writer, and filmmaker who rose to international fame in France in the 20th century. He was one of the numerous Hungarian artists who flourished in Paris beginning between the world wars.

In the early 21st century, the discovery of more than 200 letters and hundreds of drawings and other items from the period 1940 to 1984 has provided scholars with material for understanding his later life and career.

== Early life and education ==
Gyula Halász, a.k.a. Brassaï (pseudonym), was born on 9 September 1899 in Brassó, Transylvania, Kingdom of Hungary, Austria-Hungary (today Brașov, Romania) to an Armenian mother and a Hungarian father. He grew up speaking Hungarian and Romanian. When he was three his family lived in Paris for a year, while his father, a professor of French literature, taught at the Sorbonne.

As a young man, he studied painting and sculpture at the Hungarian Academy of Fine Arts (Magyar Képzőművészeti Egyetem) in Budapest. He joined a cavalry regiment of the Austro-Hungarian army, where he served until the end of the First World War. He cited Henri de Toulouse-Lautrec as an artistic influence.

== Career ==
Following World War I, his hometown of Brassó, and the rest of Transylvania, was transferred from the Kingdom of Hungary to Romania at the Treaty of Trianon. Halász left for Berlin in 1920 where he worked as a journalist for the Hungarian papers Keleti and Napkelet. He started studies at the Berlin-Charlottenburg Academy of Fine Arts (Hochschule für Bildende Künste). There he became friends with several older Hungarian artists and writers, including the painters Lajos Tihanyi and Bertalan Pór, who later moved to Paris and became part of the Hungarian circle.

In 1924, Halász moved to Paris to live, where he would stay for the rest of his life. He began teaching himself the French language by reading the works of Marcel Proust. Living among the gathering of young artists in the Montparnasse quarter, he took a job as a journalist. He soon became friends with the American writer Henry Miller, and the French writers Léon-Paul Fargue and Jacques Prévert. In the late 1920s, he lived in the same hotel as Tihanyi.

Miller later played down Brassaï's claims of friendship. In 1976 he wrote of Brassaï: "Fred [Perles] and I used to steer shy of him – he bored us." Miller added that the biography Brassaï had written of him was typically "padded", "full of factual errors, full of suppositions, rumors, documents he filched which are largely false or give a false impression."

Halász's job and his love of the city, whose streets he often wandered late at night, led to photography. He first used it to supplement some of his articles for more money, but rapidly explored the city through this medium, in which he was tutored by his fellow Hungarian André Kertész. He later wrote that he used photography "to capture the beauty of streets and gardens in the rain and fog, and to capture Paris by night." Using the name of his birthplace, Halász went by the pseudonym "Brassaï", which means "from Brasso".

Brassaï captured the essence of the city in his photographs, published as his first collection in the 1933 book entitled Paris de nuit (Paris by Night). His book gained great success, resulting in being called "the eye of Paris" in an essay by Henry Miller. In addition to photos of the seedier side of Paris, Brassaï portrayed scenes from the life of the city's high society, its intellectuals, its ballet, and the grand operas. He had been befriended by a French family who gave him access to the upper classes. Brassaï photographed many of his artist friends, including Salvador Dalí, Pablo Picasso, Henri Matisse, Alberto Giacometti, and several of the prominent writers of his time, such as Jean Genet and Henri Michaux.

Young Hungarian artists continued to arrive in Paris through the 1930s and the Hungarian circle absorbed most of them. Kertész immigrated to New York City in 1936. Brassaï befriended many of the new arrivals, including Ervin Marton, a nephew of Tihanyi, whom he had been friends with since 1920. Marton developed his own reputation in street photography in the 1940s and 1950s. Brassaï continued to earn a living with commercial work, also taking photographs for the U.S. magazine Harper's Bazaar. He was a founding member of the Rapho agency, created in Paris by Charles Rado in 1933.

Brassaï's photographs brought him international fame. In 1948, he had a one-man show at the Museum of Modern Art (MoMA) in New York City, which travelled to George Eastman House in Rochester, New York; and the Art Institute of Chicago, Illinois. MoMA exhibited more of Brassaï's works in 1953, 1956, and 1968, curated by Edward Steichen in 1956. He was presented at the Rencontres d'Arles festival in France in 1970 (screening at the Théâtre Antique, Brassaï by Jean-Marie Drot), in 1972 (screening Brassaï si, Vominino by René Burri), and in 1974 (as guest of honour).

In 1979, Brassaï was inducted into the International Photography Hall of Fame and Museum.

== Marriage ==
In 1948, Brassaï married Gilberte Boyer, a French woman. She worked with him in supporting his photography. In 1949, he became a naturalized French citizen after years of being stateless.

== Death ==
Brassaï died on 8 July 1984 at his home on the French Riviera near Nice and was buried at Montparnasse Cemetery in Paris. He was 84 years old.

== Publications by Brassaï ==
- Paris de Nuit. Paris: Arts et Métiers Graphiques, 1933. With text by Paul Morand.
  - Paris la Nuit. Paris: Flammarion, 2001. ISBN 978-2080106025. With a preface by Morand.
- Graffiti 1930–55: Textes et photos de Brassaï et deux Conversations avec Picasso, Paris: Les Éditions du Temps, 1961.
  - Graffiti, Flammarion, 2026 ISBN 978-2080491152
- Conversations avec Picasso. Paris: Éditions Gallimard, 1964; 1997. A memoir.
  - Conversations with Picasso. Chicago: University of Chicago Press, 1999; ISBN 0-226-07148-0. Translated by Jane Marie Todd.
- Henry Miller: The Paris Years. Arcade Publishing, 1975.
- The Secret Paris of the 30s. New York: Thames & Hudson, 1976; ISBN 0-500-27108-9.
- Letters to My Parents. Translated by Peter Laki; Barna Kantor. University of Chicago Press. 1997 – via Internet Archive.

== Collections ==
Brassaï's work is held in the following public collections:

- Art Institute of Chicago, Chicago: 47 prints (as of June 2020)
- Museum of Modern Art, New York City: 112 prints (as of June 2018)
- Rijksmuseum, Amsterdam: 9 prints (as of November 2018)
- Tate, London: 30 prints (as of June 2018)
- Victoria and Albert Museum, London: 407 items (as of March 2026)
