= Bertalan Pór =

Hungarian painter (1880–1964)

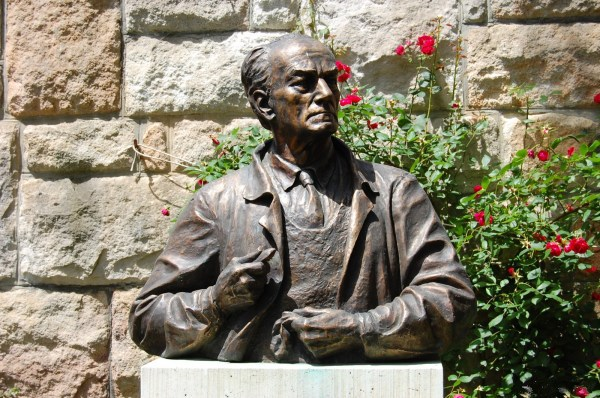
- Born: Pór Bertalan; 4 November 1880; Budapest, Austria-Hungary
- Died: 29 August 1964 (aged 83); Budapest, Hungary
- Known for: Painting
- Movement: The Eight (Nyolcak), fauvism, cubism
- Awards: Kossuth Prize

Bertalan Pór (4 November 1880 – 28 August 1964) was a Hungarian painter associated with the development of modernist Hungarian art. He was a member of The Eight, a movement among several Hungarian painters in the early twentieth century who represented the radical edge in Budapest. They introduced Fauvism, cubism, and expressionism to Hungarian art.

== Early life and education ==
Born in Budapest in 1880 to a Hungarian Jewish family, Pór started drawing as a child. He was a student of László Gyulay in the School of Industrial Design in Budapest. Because the city had no art academy, many aspiring artists went to Munich, Bavaria to study, beginning in the second half of the nineteenth century. Pór was among them, studying with the German artist Gabriel von Hackl.

Later Simon Hollósy, who had taught some free classes in Munich, and other Hungarian artists who had studied there, founded their own center in 1896 at Nagybánya (present-day Baia Mare, Romania). Founding artists included István Réti, János Thorma, and Károly Ferenczy, often called the "Nagybánya artists' colony". Their collective energy strongly influenced the development of twentieth-century Hungarian art. Pór studied at Nagybánya with Hollósy for a short time.

== Career ==
In the early 20th century, Pór went to Paris, where he studied with Jean Paul Laurens at the Académie Julian. He returned to Hungary and began his career, becoming a popular portrait painter. He also worked as a fresco painter.

In 1909 Pór joined with The Eight, which had an exhibit New Pictures in Budapest that year. They first showed as The Eight in 1911, representing the advanced edge of Hungarian art culture. Others in the group were Károly Kernstok, Róbert Berény, Dezső Czigány, Béla Czóbel, Ödön Márffy, Dezső Orbán, and Lajos Tihanyi. Although the painters mounted only three shows together, they participated in events with new music and literature, and were influential through the First World War. They shaped modernist art in the country.

Pór and Kernstok especially adopted some of the ideas of the Fauvists and Cubists, as they were influenced by both German and French theories of the time. Pór "admired Ferdinand Hodler."

Paris was closed during the Great War to artists from "non-allied" nations. After the fall of the Hungarian Democratic Republic in 1919, Pór was one of the many artists who emigrated; he went to Czechoslovakia. He primarily painted landscapes and pictures of animals. During this period abroad, Pór also traveled to France, Italy, and the Soviet Union on artistic patronage.

He settled in Paris in 1938, where there were numerous other Hungarian émigrés in the artistic circles, including a younger generation. Tihanyi died in Paris that year, but he had introduced Pór to his young nephew, Ervin Marton, who had come to Paris in 1937 and whose work in photography Tihanyi encouraged.

During 1944–1946 after the Liberation of Paris, Pór worked with Marton and the writer György Bölöni on reorganizing the Hungarian House, a center for the émigré artistic community. Artists ran it cooperatively as a place to feature their works in contemporary art. Pór continued to be involved with the Hungarians in Paris.

In 1948, after the rise of the communist government in Hungary, Pór was offered a position in the Budapest Academy (what is now the Hungarian University of Fine Arts). He returned to the capital to teach. Except for travel, he remained there, teaching and painting, for the rest of his life.

The Hungarian National Gallery holds one of Por's oil self-portraits from the 1910s. The Museum of Modern Art in New York City has his 1919 lithograph, Világ Proletárjai Egyesüljetek! (Proletarians of the World, Unite!).

== Exhibits ==
- .1991–1992, Standing in the Storm: The Hungarian Avant-Garde from 1908 to 1930, Santa Barbara Museum of Art, Santa Barbara, California

== Legacy and honors ==
With the centenary of the first show of The Eight in 1911, exhibits have been mounted about them as a group and individually:

- 2011, A Nyolcak (The Eight): A Centenary Exhibition, Janus Pannonius Museum, Pécs, 10 December 2010 – 27 March 2011
- 2012, The Eight. Hungary's Highway in the Modern (Die Acht. Ungarns Highway in die Moderne), 12 September – 2 December 2012, Bank Austria Kunstforum, Wien, collaboration with Museum of Fine Arts and Magyar Nemzeti Galéria, Budapest.

== See also ==
- Károly Kernstok
- Róbert Berény
- Dezső Czigány
- Béla Czóbel
- Ödön Márffy
- Desiderius Orban
- Lajos Tihanyi
