= Nyergesújfalu =

Nyergesújfalu Neudorf
- Town
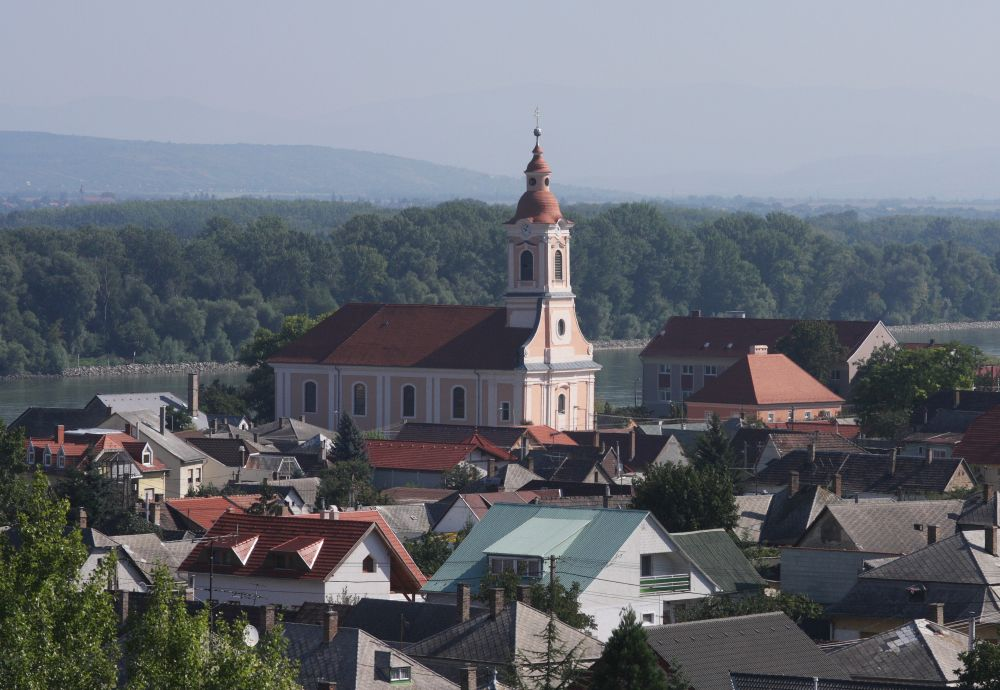

- Flag Seal

- Location of Komárom-Esztergom county in Hungary

- Location of Nyergesújfalu
- Coordinates: 47.75678°N 18.54875°E
- Country: Hungary
- Region: Central Transdanubia
- County: Komárom-Esztergom
- District: Esztergom

Government
  - Mayor: Magdolna Mihelik (Fidesz-KDNP)

Area
  - Total: 39.51 km^{2} (15.25 sq mi)

Population (2004)
  - Total: 7,649
  - Density: 193.59/km^{2} (501.4/sq mi)
- Time zone: UTC+1 (CET)
  - Summer (DST): UTC+2 (CEST)
- Postal code: 2536
- Area code: (+36) 33
- Website: www.nyergesujfalu.hu

Nyergesújfalu (German: Neudorf; Latin: Crumerum) is a town in Komárom-Esztergom County, Hungary, in the Central Transdanubia region.

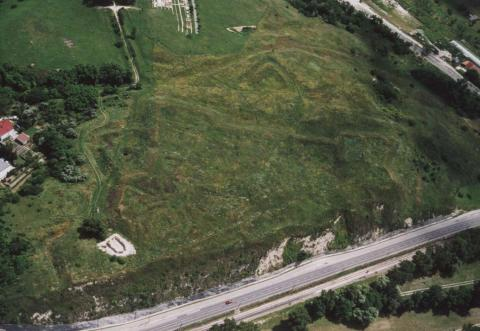
Aerial photography showing outline of Roman Castle Crumerum, Nyergesújfalu

== History ==
The city, located near the river Danube, is an ancient site of habitation. It was located on the Crumerum, a major Roman trade and military route. Late-era Romans built a fort here, to help protect the northern border of their empire. The settlement was later overrun by various tribes and, later still, by invaders from the Ottoman Empire. In the periods of warfare the fort was destroyed.

European travelers later noted the fort's ruins; for instance, in the mid-18th century, travel writer Richard Pococke wrote about it. "We saw the ruins of the fort, several Roman bricks and elsewhere foundations that seemed to be Roman." The struggle for freedom in the region in the later 18th century resulted in the destruction of most of the fort. A century later, not even remnant stones were visible.

In the late 18th century Maria Theresa of Austria recruited German farmers to immigrate to the Danube Valley in order to repopulate it and revive agriculture. It had suffered a decline in population during the period of the Ottoman invasion, aggravated by plagues. The Germans came mostly from southern principalities and were Catholic; they were allowed to keep their language and religion, and established predominantly German-speaking towns. They translated the town's name to "Sattel- Neudorf".

The church still standing in the middle of Nyergesujfalu was finished in baroque style in 1770, on land granted to its founders by Empress Maria Theresa of Austria. Next to the church is the Salesian secondary school, founded by a religious order. Attila József, a noted 20th-century poet, studied here for a short time.

In the last few centuries, the local "fast riders" made the town's name famous. Simon Kézai wrote about the town in his chronicles, referring to it as "Nyergedszeg." Under differing regimes, it was later changed to "Ujfalu" and, more recently, has been spelled as "Nyergesujfalu."

Following World War II, many ethnic Germans were expelled from Hungary and other parts of eastern Europe, as Nazi leader Adolf Hitler had used them as an excuse for warfare. He had said he wanted to reunite ethnic Germans throughout Europe, under the rule of Germany, although these and others in Hungary had lived as Hungarians for more than 200 years.

In the late 20th century, the site of the Roman earthwork fort was rediscovered through aerial photography, which revealed its outlines. Some archeological excavations have been conducted at the site. They have established the original size of the fort and other details. It has become a destination for tourists and hikers. The latter also take advantage of hills and trails in the region. Nyergesújfalu officially became a city in 1989.

The city is associated with the noted 20th-century painter Károly Kernstok (1873–1940), who inherited a house in Nyergesújfalu and lived here for several years. He was the center of an artistic community in Budapest known as The Eight (Nyolcak) (1909–1918), who created the modernist movement in Hungarian art.

== Twin towns – sister cities ==
Nyergesújfalu is twinned with:

- Karlsdorf-Neuthard, Germany
- Neu Wulmstorf, Germany

== Sport ==
Nyergesújfalu SE is an association football club playing in Megyei Bajnokság I, the fourth division of the Hungarian league system. The club's biggest success was achieved in the late 1950s by winning the 1957–58 Nemzeti Bajnokság III.
