= Lajos Gulácsy =

Hungarian painter

Gulácsy, Lajos
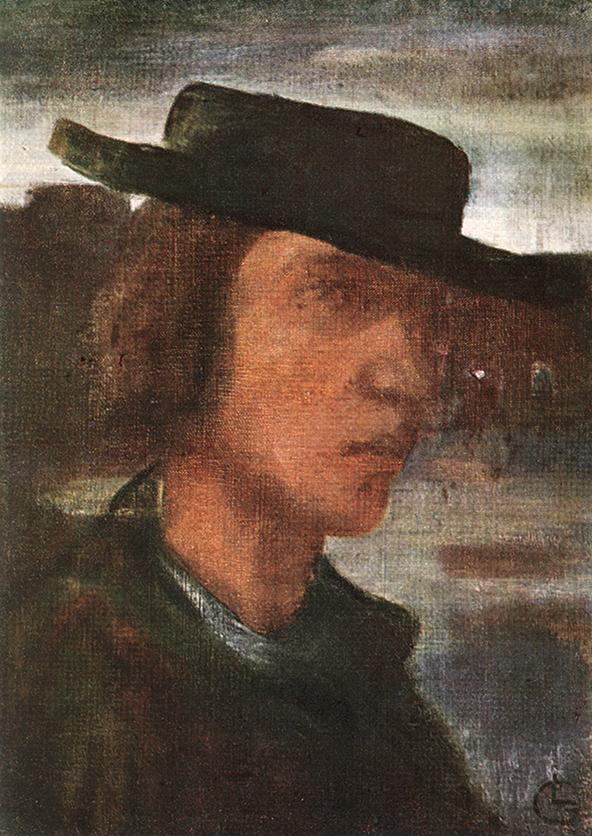
- Self portrait with hat
- Born: 12 October 1882; Budapest
- Died: 21 February 1932 (aged 49); Budapest

Lajos Gulácsy (12 October 1882 – 21 February 1932) was a Hungarian painter with works collected by the Hungarian National Gallery. Heavily influenced by the Pre-Raphaelites, his rather dreamlike work is associated with Art Nouveau and Symbolism, but can also be considered a prelude to Surrealism.

He was educated at the Hungarian Royal Drawing School in Budapest. He was traumatised by World War One and incarcerated in a psychiatric institution in Lipótmező from 1917 until his death. He went completely blind in 1924.
