= Róbert Berény =

Hungarian painter

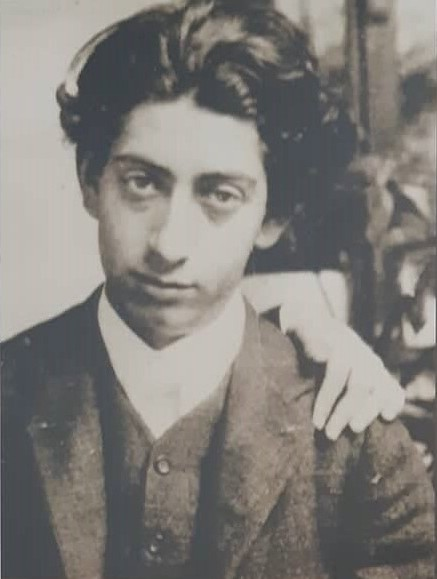
Róbert Berény

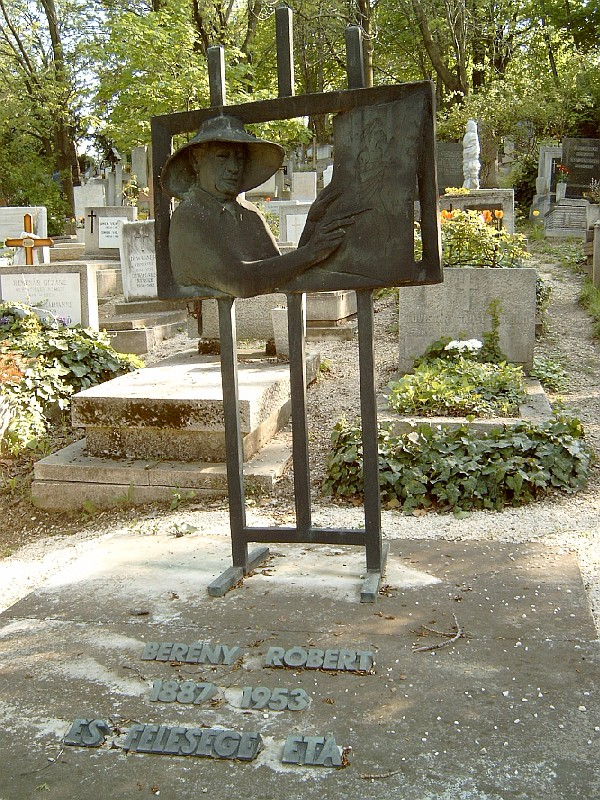
Tomb of Róbert Berény

Róbert Berény (18 March 1887 – 10 September 1953) was a Hungarian painter, one of the avant-garde group known as The Eight who introduced cubism and expressionism to Hungarian art in the early twentieth century before the First World War. He had studied and exhibited in Paris as a young man and was also considered one of the Hungarian Fauves.

== Early life and education ==
Róbert Berény was born in Budapest in 1887. As a young man of 17, in 1904 he studied under the artist Tivadar Zemplényi for several months before moving to study at the Académie Julian in Paris.

While there, Berény was particularly influenced by the power of Paul Cézanne's art. He also adopted some of the uses of color of the Fauve movement, and exhibited at the Salon d'Automne with French artists of the Fauvists.

== Career ==
Berény is best known for his form of expressionism and cubism, which he developed in association with the avant-garde group known as The Eight, who had their first exhibit together in Budapest in 1909. They included the leader Károly Kernstok, Lajos Tihanyi, Béla Czóbel, Dezső Czigány, Ödön Márffy, Dezső Orbán, and Bertalan Pór. He brought to them French influences from his time in Paris.

At their next exhibition, in 1911, the group identified as A Nyolcak, or "The Eight." They essentially formed the core of modernist experimentation, and were part of radical intellectual currents in music and literature, as well. Berény's most important work of this early period is his portrait of the composer Béla Bartók (1913). That year he also painted Scene.

In 1919, Berény participated in the art life of the brief Hungarian Democratic Republic, and was the leader of the department for painting in the Art Directorate. After the fall of the republic that year, Berény emigrated to Berlin, together with numerous other Hungarian artists and writers. He lived and worked there for several years, continuing his emphasis on cubism and expressionism. He did not return to Hungary until 1926.

After 1934, he worked in Zebegény, near the Danube Bend in northern Hungary. He was awarded the Szinnyei Prize in 1936.

During the last year of World War II, Berény's atelier was destroyed, together with many of his works. After the war, under the communist government, he became a teacher in what is now the Hungarian University of Fine Arts in Budapest. He died in 1953.

Since the late twentieth century and the political changes in eastern Europe, there has been renewed interest in Hungary's early modernist artists. The exhibits below have honored Berény and others of The Eight, and two bracket the centenary of their first exhibit in 1911 under that name.

== Rediscovered work ==
A Berény painting titled Sleeping Lady with Black Vase, whose whereabouts had been unknown since 1928, was re-discovered by chance in 2009 by art historian Gergely Barki upon watching the 1999 American film Stuart Little with his daughter, where the piece was used as a prop. An assistant set designer had bought the painting cheaply from a California antique store for use in the film, and had kept it in her home after production ended. The painting was sold at auction in Budapest on 13 December 2014 for €229,500.

== Exhibits ==
- 1991–1992, Standing in the Storm: The Hungarian Avant-Garde from 1908-1930, Santa Barbara Museum of Art, Santa Barbara, California
- 2006, Hungarian Fauves from Paris to Nagybánya, 1904-1914, 21 March – 30 July 2006, Hungarian National Gallery
- 2010, A Nyolcak (The Eight): A Centenary Exhibition, 10 December 2010 – 27 March 2011, Janus Pannonius Museum, Pécs
- 2012, The Eight. Hungary's Highway in the Modern (Die Acht. Ungarns Highway in die Moderne), 12 September - 2 December 2012, Bank Austria Kunstforum, Wien, collaboration with Museum of Fine Arts and Magyar Nemzeti Galéria, Budapest.

== External links and sources ==
- "Róbert Berény", Fine Arts in Hungary
