= Tett =

Tett is a surname. Notable people with the surname include:

- Benjamin Tett (1798–1878), Canadian businessman and political figure from Ontario
- Brandon Tett (born 1987), American football player
- Gillian Tett (born 1967), British author and journalist
- John Tett (1916–1974), Canadian physical fitness educator and public servant
- Simon Tett, British climatologist

== See also ==
- Tett turret, a type of hardened field fortification built in Britain during the invasion crisis of 1940–1941.
