= Sándor Ziffer =

Hungarian painter

Sándor Ziffer (May 5, 1880, in Eger – September 8, 1962, in Baia Mare) was a Hungarian painter characterized by his strong decorative paintings and use of definite contours and colour in his works.

== His career path ==
He studied at the School of Arts in Budapest, then went to the academy in Munich, where he studied with Hans-Joachim Raupp, and then visited the school of Anton Ažbe. Simon Hollósy was his master at home from 1904. From 1906, he painted at the artist colony in Nagybánya. Meanwhile, he gained experience in Paris, Berlin, (where he encountered forms of expressionism which impacted upon his painting), Hamburg and again in Munich. He also presented his works at exhibitions in these cities.

He absorbed the features of post-Impressionist, then expressionist and cubist styles. From 1908 to 1911, he was a member of the MIÉNK (OURS - in English) artist group led by Pál Szinyei Merse.

In 1918, he permanently settled in Nagybánya, where he taught from 1935 to 1945 and corrected the drawings and paintings of painting students. Ziffer was the master of many Hungarian and Romanian painters in Romania, including János Karácsony and Lídia Agricola. Ziffer was not only an excellent painter, but also an excellent draughtsman, some of his paintings have an almost graphic tone, for example the Morgó Valley. His work from 1923, of course he also has graphic works, including Woman with a Cat.

Most of the Hungarian artists who stayed in Nagybánya lived in real poverty after the Second World War. Even Sándor Ziffer had a hard time gaining social recognition. It is to the credit of the sculptor Géza Vida that in 1950 the old master was able to receive a personal pension, and in 1954 he was awarded the Order of Merit.

In 1957, a collection exhibition of his works was organized in Nagybány and Cluj.

He died in Nagybánya in 1962, and was laid to rest in Nagybánya cemetery.

== His art ==
He was able to reconcile the modern painting trends of the turn of the century with the plein air traditions of Nagybánya, he never succumbed to epigones, his works were always fresh, colorful, decorative, expressive and rationally thought out. The peak of his creative era falls on the period between the two world wars. Later he had an accident, after the Second World War he could only paint from the window of his studio.

Six of his paintings are held in the Hungarian National Gallery.

== External links and sources ==
- Fine Arts in Hungary
