= The Eight (painters) =

Hungarian modernist painter collective

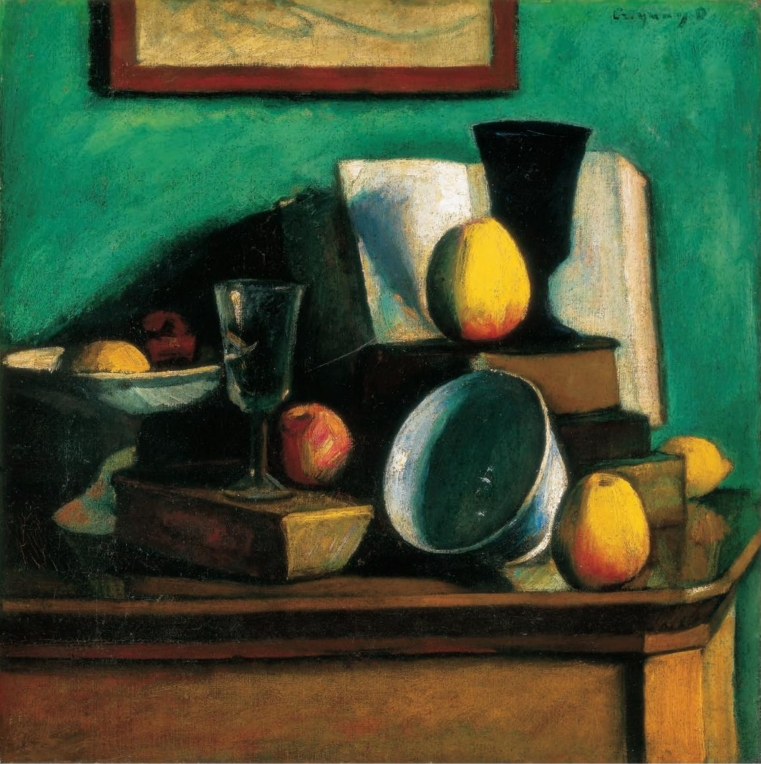
Still-life with Apples and Plate by Dezső Czigány (c. 1915)

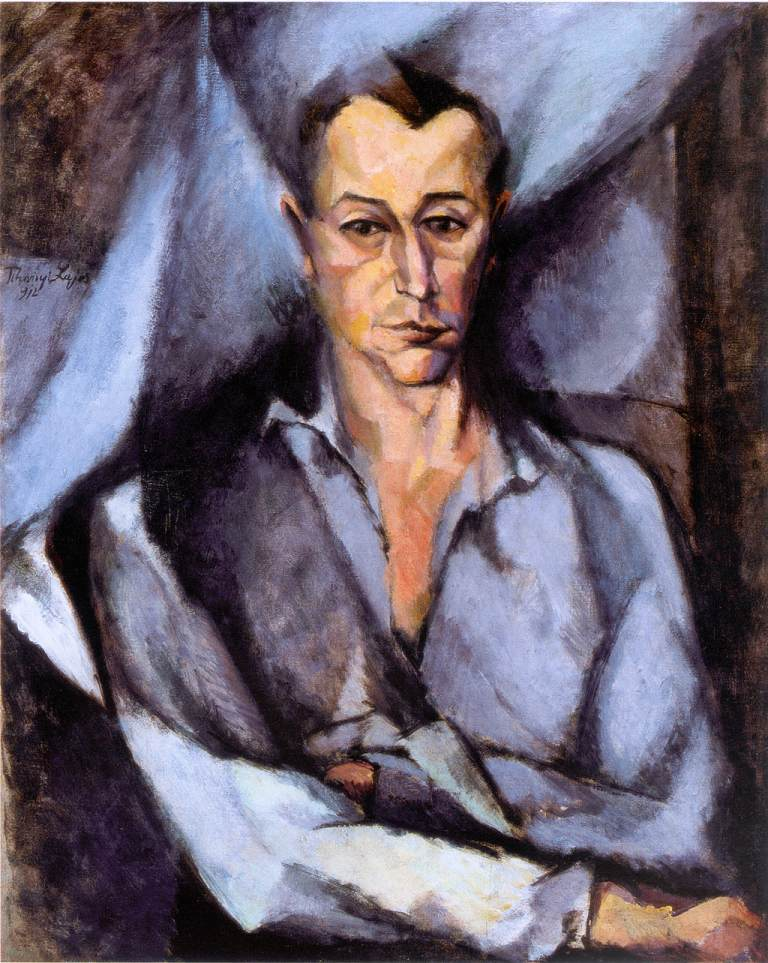
Portrait of György Bölöni by Lajos Tihanyi (1912)

The Eight (A Nyolcak in Hungarian language) was an avant-garde art movement of Hungarian painters active mostly in Budapest from 1909 to 1918. They were connected to Post-Impressionism and radical movements in literature and music as well, and led to the rise of modernism in art culture.

The members of The Eight, Róbert Berény, Dezső Czigány, Béla Czóbel, Károly Kernstok, Ödön Márffy, Dezső Orbán, Bertalan Pór and Lajos Tihanyi, were primarily inspired by French painters and art movements including Paul Cézanne, Henri Matisse, and Fauvism.

Exhibits were held in 2011 and 2012 in Hungary and Austria, respectively, to mark the centenary of the group's first exhibit as The Eight in Budapest in 1911.

== Background ==
The Eight opened their first exhibition on 30 December 1909 at the Könyves Kálmán Salon (Budapest) under the title New Pictures. Their second exhibition, entitled The Eight, opened in April 1911 in the National Salon. While The Eight as a group had only three exhibitions, their activity was of immense significance, as their influence went far beyond the visual arts. The exhibitions were accompanied by a series of symposia, and by events featuring new Hungarian literature and contemporary music.

Márffy was proud of this intellectual kinship throughout his life. A year before his death, he said:

"It fills me with happiness to know that my youth coincided with that memorable period in intellectual development, when not only in Europe but also in Hungary, those seeking new, better things in literature, music, painting, science, politics and social life were carried by vibrant, seething currents. It can’t have been by chance that Endre Ady broke in with his new songs at the time when Béla Bartók came with his new chords, when progressive intellectuals gathered round reviews like "Nyugat" (Occident) and "XX. Század" (20th century), when 'Nyolcak' (the Eight), a group that sought new ways appeared (…)"

== Exhibits ==
- A Nyolcak (The Eight): A Centenary Exhibition, Janus Pannonius Museum Modern Hungarian Gallery, Pécs, 10 December 2010 – 27 March 2011
- 2012, Lajos Tihanyi - A bohème painter in Budapest, Berlin and Paris, 20 April - 20 August 2012, KOGART Haz, Budapest
- 2012, The Eight. Hungary's Highway in the Modern (Die Acht. Ungarns Highway in die Moderne), 12 September 2012 – 2 December 2012, Bank Austria Kunstforum, Wien, collaboration with Museum of Fine Arts and Magyar Nemzeti Galéria, Budapest.
- 2013, Allegro Barbaro. Béla Bartók et la modernité hongroise (1905-1920). Paris, Musée d'Orsay, 15 October 2013. - 5 January 2014.
