= Hungarian National Gallery =

National art museum in Hungary

- Magyar Nemzeti Galéria
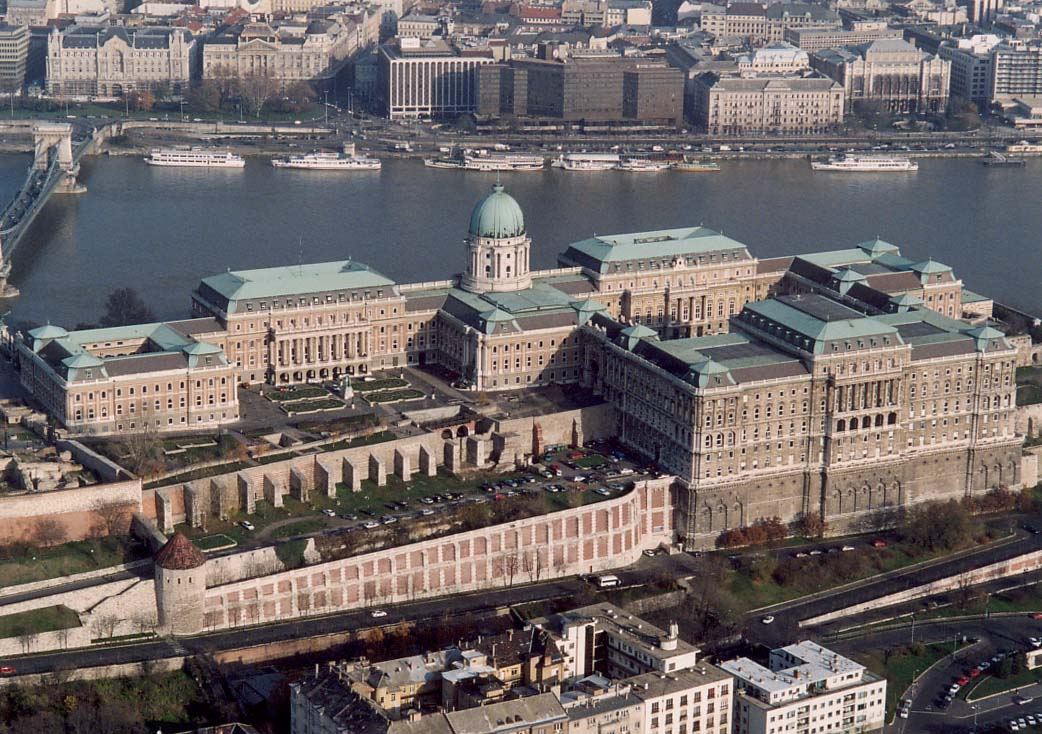
- The gallery is located in a section of Buda Castle
- Interactive fullscreen map
- Established: 5 October 1957
- Location: Budapest, Hungary
- Coordinates: 47°29′46″N 19°02′23″E
- Accreditation: National art museum.
- Website: www.mng.hu/en

The Hungarian National Gallery (also known as Magyar Nemzeti Galéria, pronounced [ˈmɒɟɒr ˈnɛmzɛti ˈɡɒleːrijɒ]) was established in 1957 as the national art museum. It is located in Buda Castle in Budapest, Hungary. Its collections cover Hungarian art in all genres, including the works of many nineteenth- and twentieth-century Hungarian artists who worked in Paris and other locations in the West. The primary museum for international art in Budapest is the Museum of Fine Arts.

== Exhibitions ==
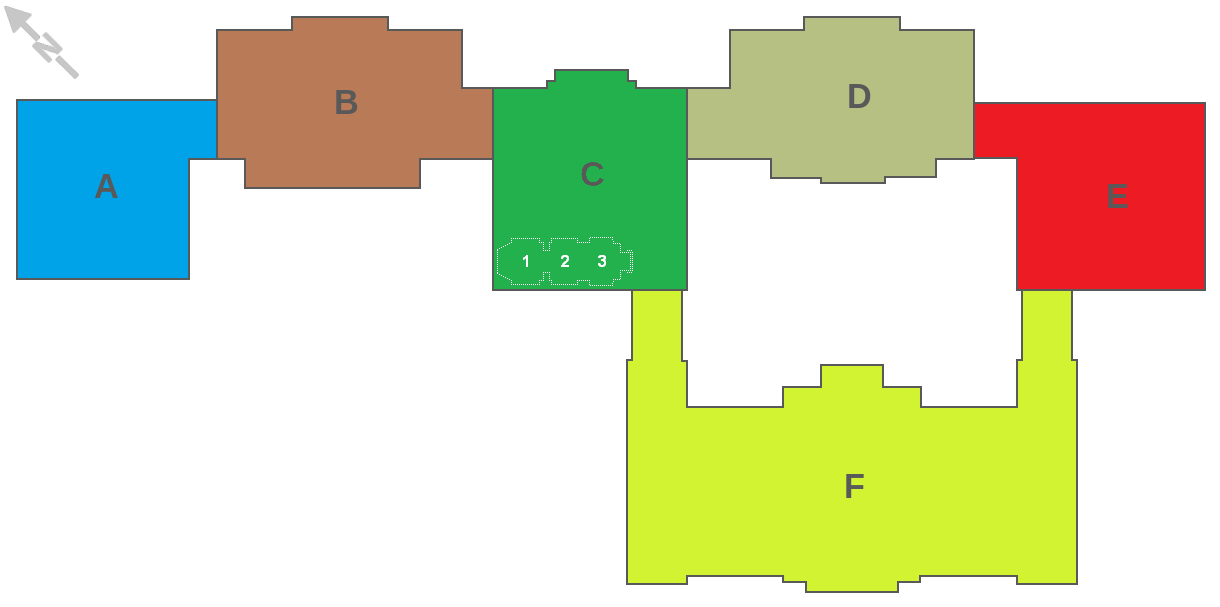
Plan of Buda Castle: buildings A, B, C, D – Hungarian National Gallery, building E – Budapest Historical Museum, building F – National Széchényi Library. Underneath building C is the Palatinal Crypt with 3 rooms.

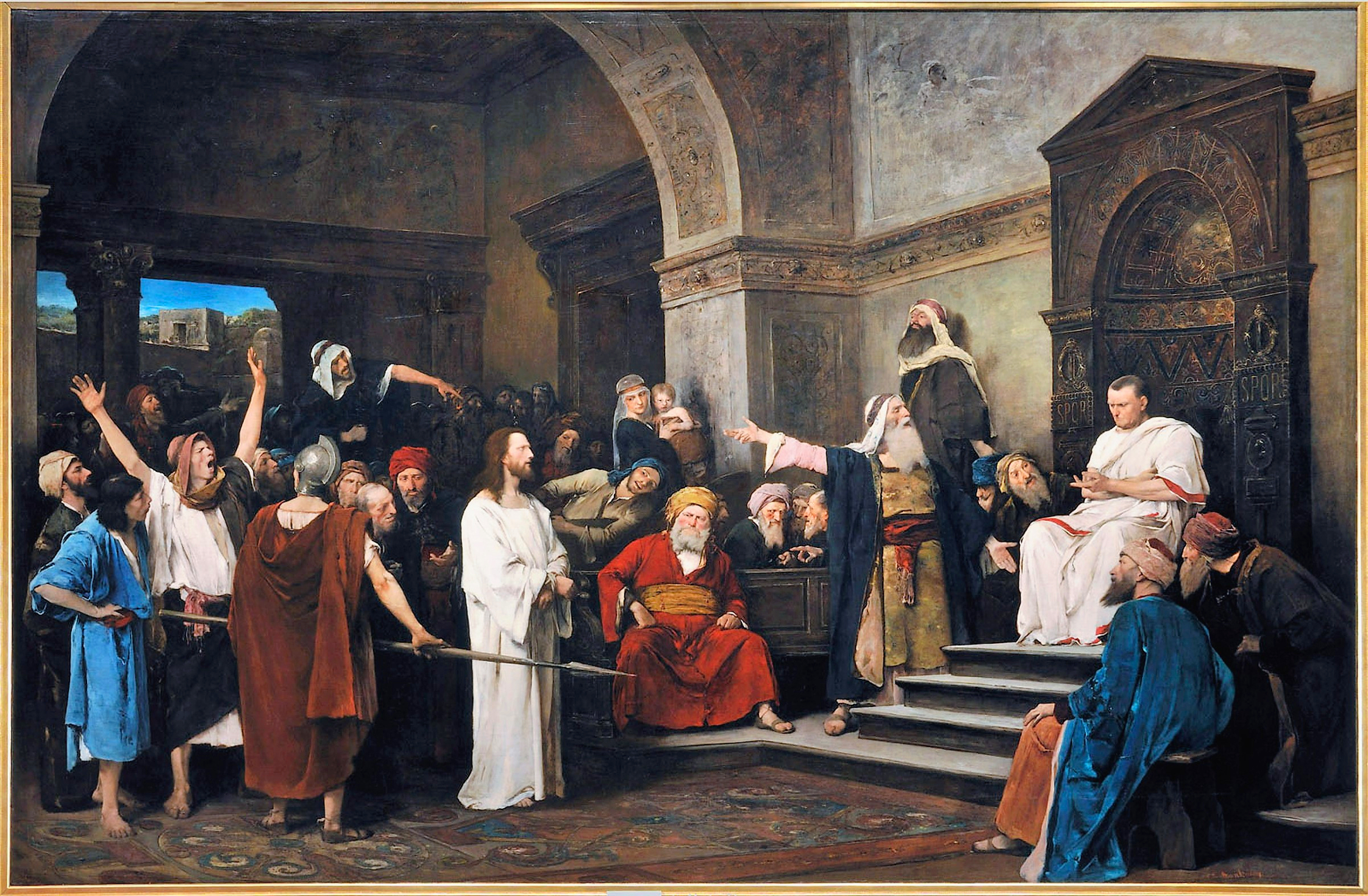
Christ in front of Pilate, Mihály Munkácsy, 1881

The National Gallery houses Medieval, Renaissance, Gothic art, and Baroque Hungarian art. The collection includes wood altars from the 15th century.

The museum displays a number of works from Hungarian sculptors such as Károly Alexy, Maurice Ascalon, Miklós Borsos, Gyula Donáth, János Fadrusz, Béni Ferenczy, István Ferenczy and Miklós Izsó. It also exhibits paintings and photographs by major Hungarian artists such as Brassai and Ervin Marton, part of the circle who worked in Paris before World War II. The gallery displays the work of artists such as Mihály Munkácsy and László Paál. The museum also holds paintings by Henrik Weber, Károly Markó the Elder, József Borsos, Miklós Barabás, Bertalan Székely, Károly Lotz, Pál Szinyei Merse, István Csók, Béla Iványi-Grünwald, Tivadar Kosztka Csontváry (Ruins of Ancient Theatre, Taormina), József Rippl-Rónai (Models), and Károly Ferenczy.

== Gallery ==
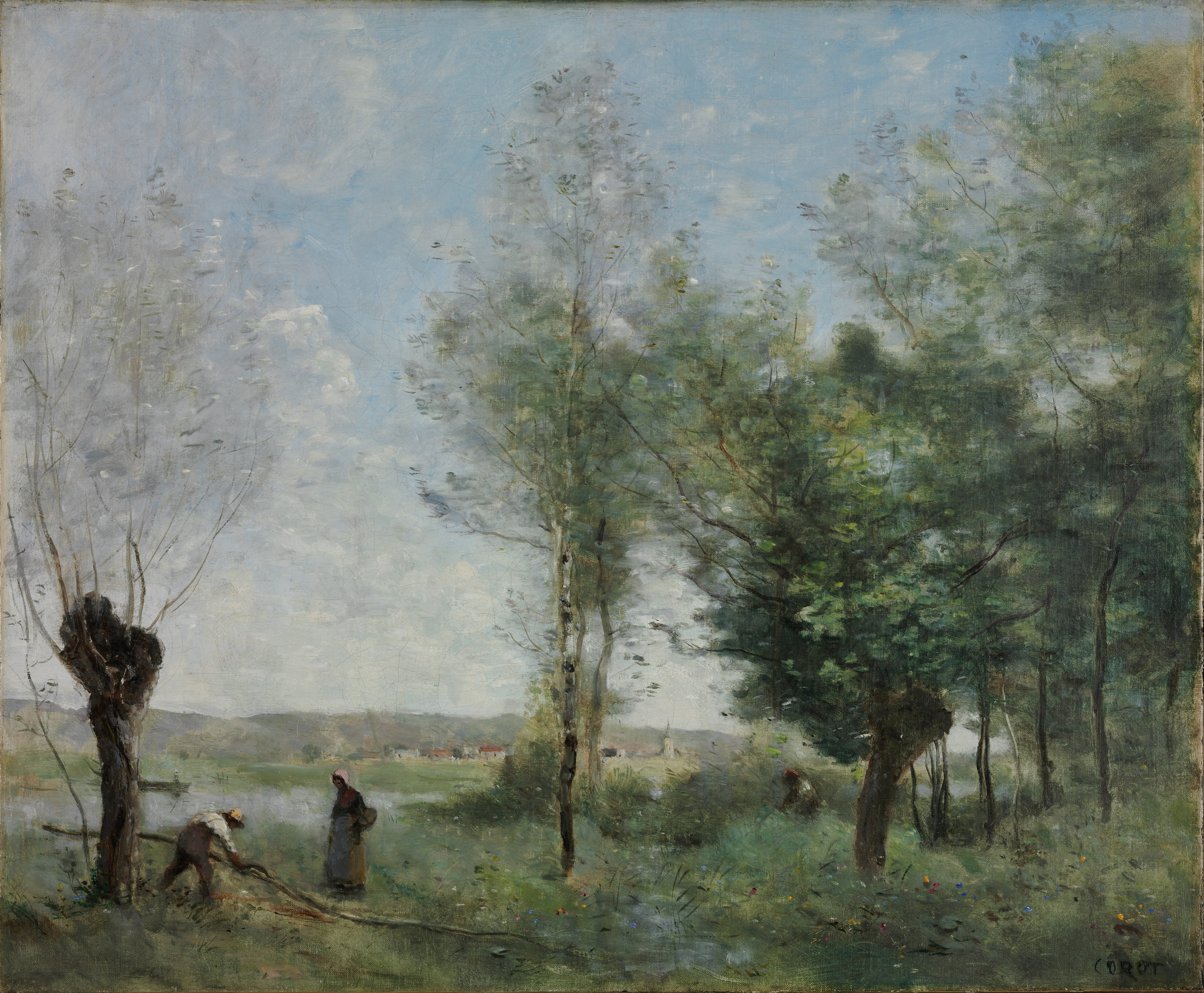
Camille Corot

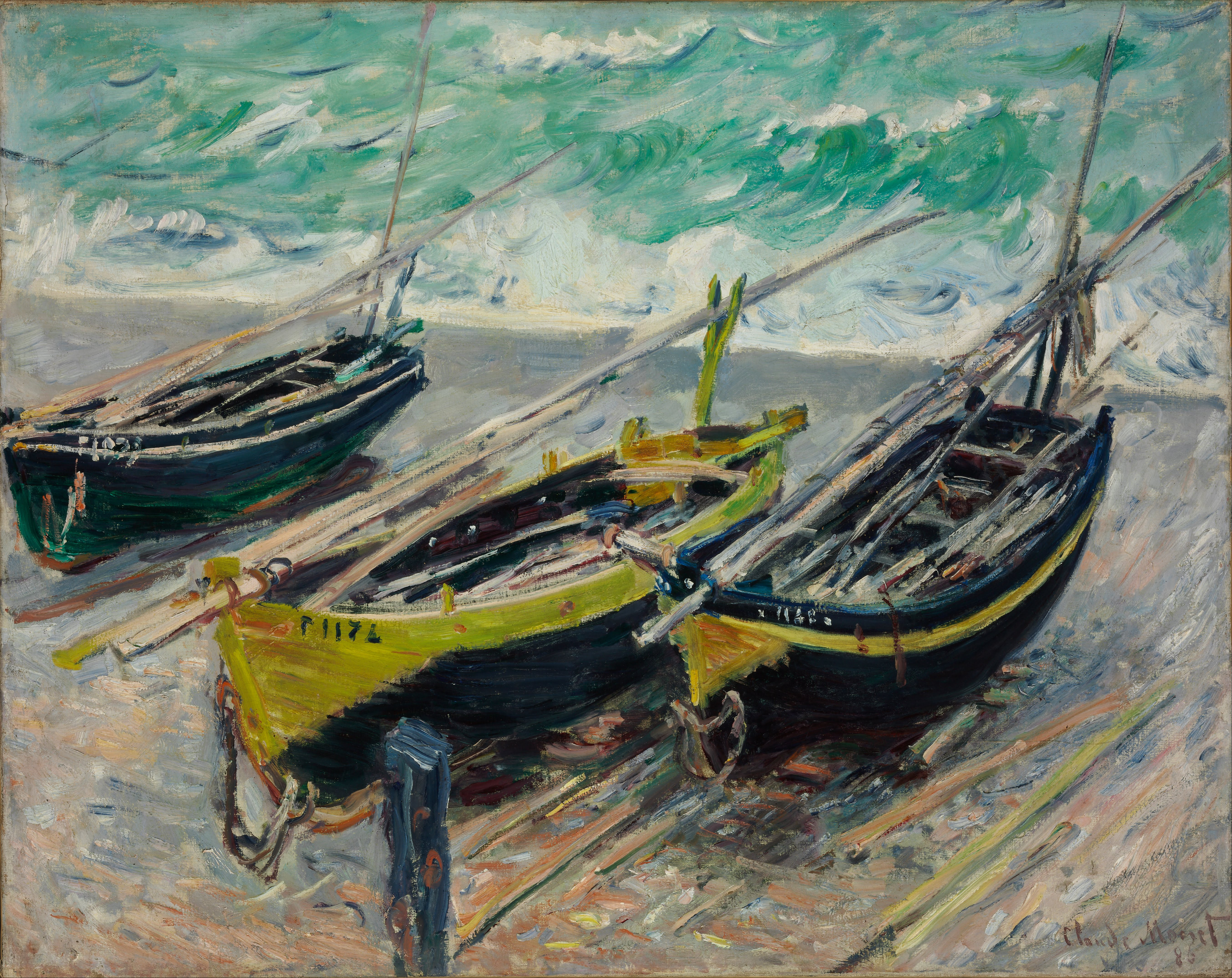
Claude Monet
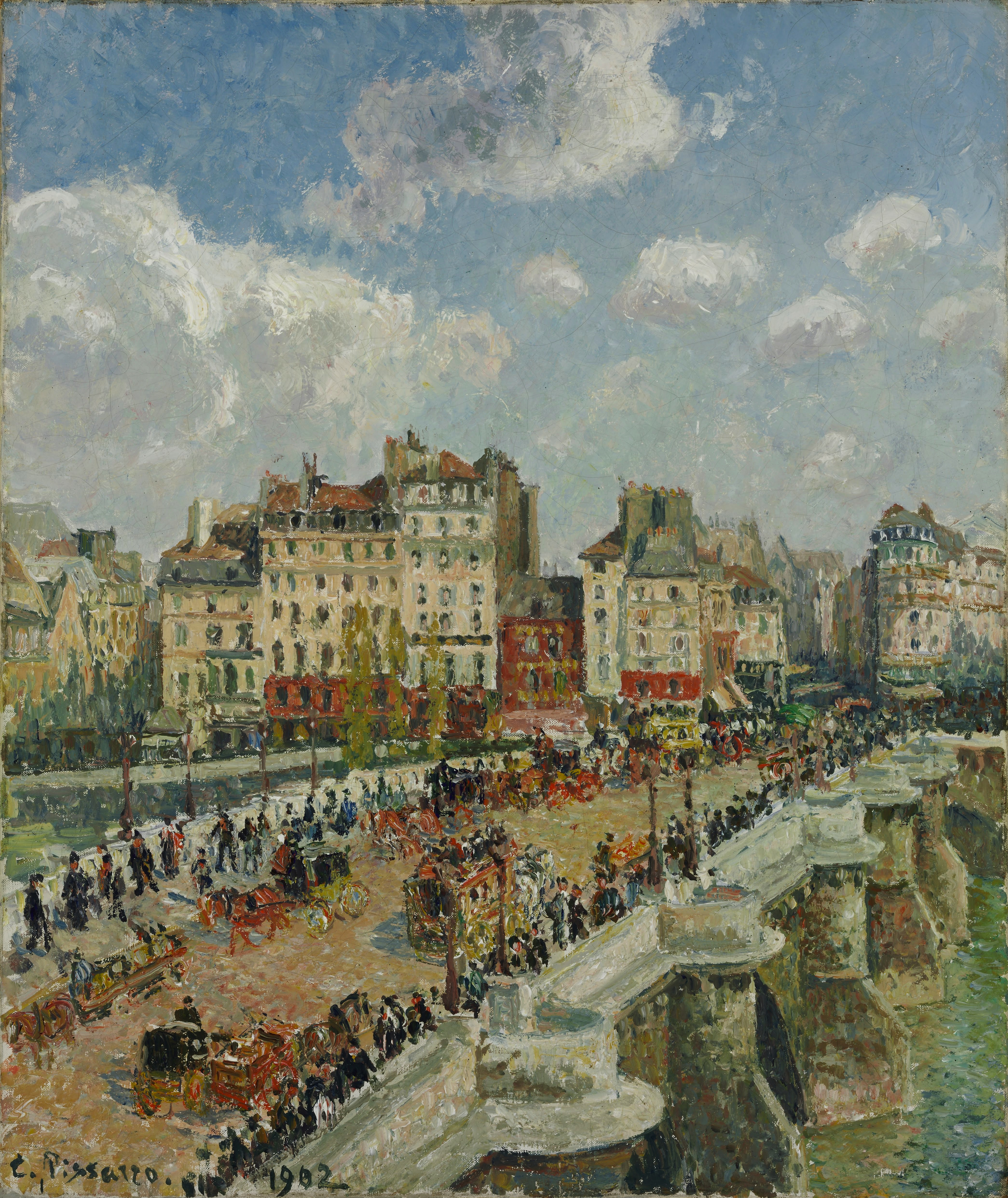
Camille Pissarro

Master MS, Marten Schwartz

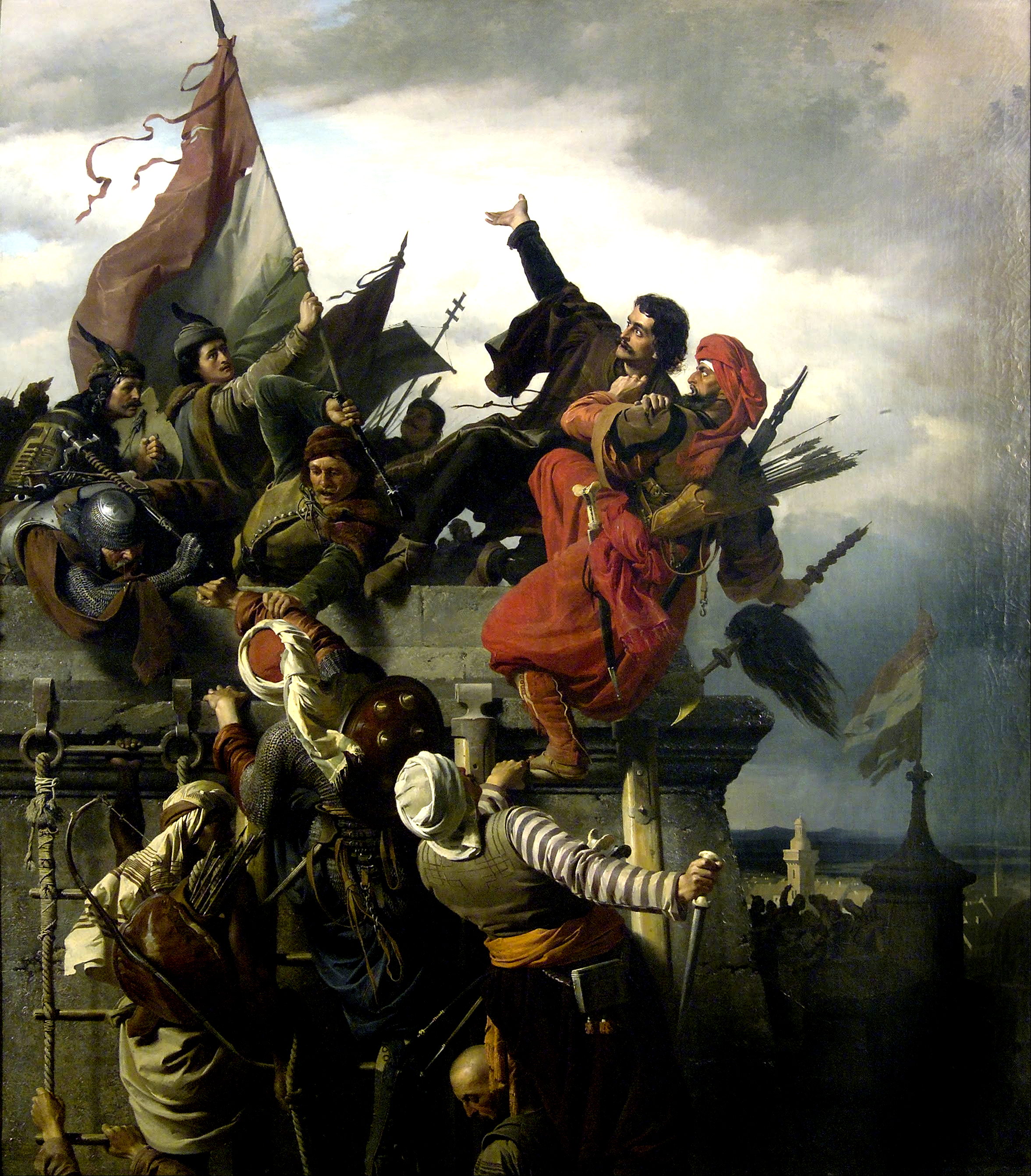
Wágner, Sándor

== Controversy ==
In 2008, the director of the Museum of Fine Arts, László Baán, proposed the merging of his museum with the National Gallery, due to the similar exhibition and collection profile of the two. Both museums and the Ludwig Museum of Contemporary Art specialize in 20th-century and contemporary fine art, much of which was created by Hungarian artists living overseas. After his request to add an €18million underground extension to the Museum of Fine Arts — which would have united collections spread across the city — was denied in February 2011, Baán presented an alternative plan to the government to build two new buildings at the cost of €150m. He envisioned the new buildings — one housing contemporary European art and the other Hungarian photography — as a "special museum island" that would complement the Museum of Fine Arts and the Budapest Art Hall (Műcsarnok) by permanently joining the two collections by 2017.

In September 2011, Secretary of State for Culture Géza Szőcs officially announced plans to build a new structure along Andrássy út close to City Park and near the existing Budapest Museum of Fine Arts and Budapest Art Hall (Műcsarnok). This building would house the collections of the current Hungarian National Gallery. This expanded plan, which would utilize the entire boulevard, is also referred to as the Budapest Museum Quarter or Andrássy Quarter.

In early December 2011, Ferenc Csák — director of the National Gallery since 2010 and critical of the proposed merger of the gallery with the Museum of Fine Arts— called the merger process “[v]ery unprofessional, anti–democratic and short–sighted” and announced that he would resign at the end of 2011. As of 5 March 2012, a new director had not been named and the National Gallery was being led by Deputy General Director György Szűcs.
