= István Csók =

Hungarian painter

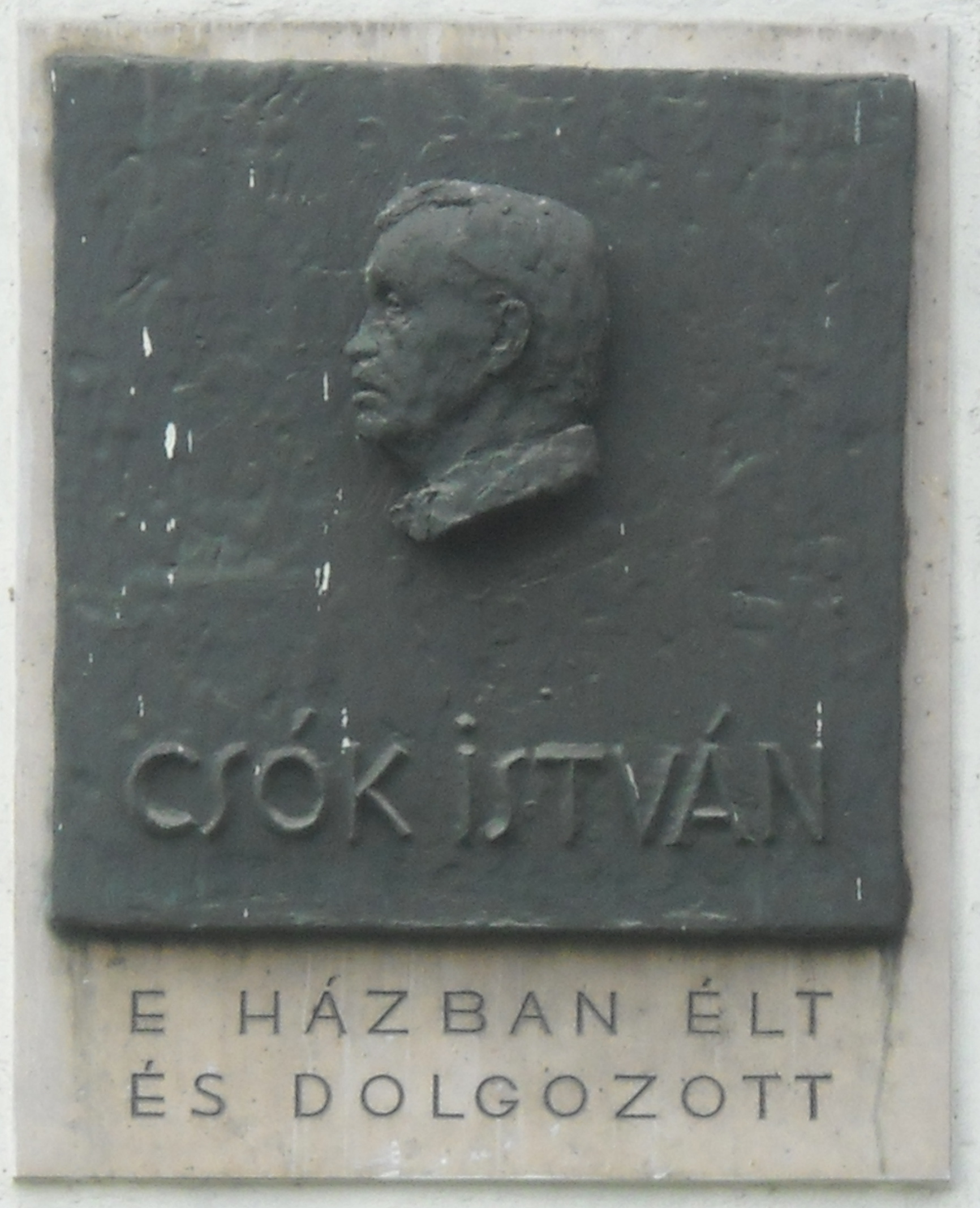
István Csók

István Csók (13 February 1865, Sáregres – 1 February 1961, Budapest) was a Hungarian Impressionist painter.

Although he was born in Transdanubia, his narrower homeland was not a hill country, but the flat greens of the Sárrét, the humid air of the Sárvíz and Malomvíz, and the lush green vegetation.

== Life ==
When he was a child, Csók found an excellent environment for his daydreams weaving tales on the banks of the roaring stream, where he spent hours in the shade of the weeping willows or at the base of the rustling reeds, immersed in his storybook or daydreaming.

He was a sickly, weak child and his family pampered him and condoned his little pranks. Later, in high school, he interpreted learning in a peculiar way: he was unable to deal with what he didn't feel like doing, but he didn't have to study what he liked. After seeing the warnings sent home every quarter, his father finally ran out of patience and reproachfully asked the question in his reprimanding letter: "What will become of you?" However, young Csók had already decided by this time that he would become a painter. His family was not surprised by his decision, as he had been drawing passionately since childhood.

Thus, in 1882, he entered the Model Drawing School in Budapest, where he studied under the direction of Bertalan Székely, János Greguss, and Károly Lotz until 1885.

At that time, lively artistic activity was already taking place in the capital. Gyula Benczúr, who was called home from his teaching position at the Munich Academy, led the Master School, and Bertalan Székely, Károly Lotz, and János Greguss taught at the Model Drawing School. Csók also visited the school for a while, but he did not agree with the way of teaching. Instead of the academy, he preferred to visit galleries and museums and copy the works of old artists. After three years of restless hesitation, he decided to continue his studies abroad.

He had two options: Munich or Paris. Paris represented the free development of individuality, the stage for the development of advanced artistic trends. Munich represented the methodical training in drawing, the academic style of painting. This is precisely what Csók wanted to escape from when he left the Model Drawing School, but, ultimately, he chose Munich instead of Paris, and attended the Academy of Fine Arts from 1886-87. He, like so many other painters, followed the almost traditional path that led through Munich to Paris.

At the Munich Academy, he was enrolled in the class of the then most famous painting teacher, Löfftz. Here, no matter how much it was against his will, he was forced to adapt to the methods of academic painting, the precise regulations of which were strictly kept in mind by the school's rules. However, life in Munich was made intimate and homely for him by the direct and cheerful atmosphere that was common both at the painting academy and in the afternoon life of artists. He formed an intimate friendship with the Hungarian painters living here, and shared worries and joys with Béla Iványi Grünwald, István Réti, Károly Ferenczy, József Rónai Rippl and the spiritual leader of the Hungarian artists in Munich: Simon Hollósy.

In 1888 he moved to Paris. He wanted to be free and to go his own way, free from the influence of every school and every artistic style. That's why he didn't seek the patronage of Munkácsy, who was enjoying the fullness of his glory in Paris at the time and helped several young compatriots in the difficult days of their start. He also avoided the state painting school, instead attending the more liberal Academie Julian.

Bouguereau and Robert Fleury were his masters, but the artistic spirit that surrounded them all and its concrete manifestation in the works of Bastien-Lepage and Dagnan Bouveret had a greater influence on him, even on his Hungarian contemporaries there.

Csók was particularly impressed by the latter's painting. It was then that his work entitled "Potato Peelers" was created, which shows an interesting combination of Munich and Paris influences. He exhibited this work for the first time in 1889 in Paris.

However, the traditions of Hungarian painting and the limitations of Munich's artistic perception dictated its development for a long time. Difficult years of self-discovery and artistic struggle followed. He returned to Munich again in 1890 and spent seven years here with interruptions.

In the early period of his art, he created powerful, cartoonish figural compositions with folk subjects, and then painted many women dressed in colorful folk costumes, such as his famous work "The Lord's Supper" in Munich in 1890, i.e. "Do This in Memory of Me", which he presented in the Hall of Art in Budapest, and with which, in the Paris Salon in 1891, he won a first-class gold medal, a first-class gold medal at the Antwerp exhibition in 1894, and a first-class gold medal at the Exposition Universelle (Paris World Exhibition) in 1900.

The two years in Paris did not pass without a trace: his painting gradually freed itself from the atmosphere of Munich, his colors became more heightened and informal.

From 1891-92, Csók's painting "Orphans" was a general success. At the winter show, he won the HUF 1,000 company prize with it at the Hall of Art in Budapest, the state bought it, and, in 1894, in Vienna, the Austrian state awarded it a large gold medal, and, in the same year, the first class gold medal in Antwerp. In Munich, Csók kept in touch with the Hollósy circle for a while, but later distanced himself from it, and only the legendary news of the first summer in Nagybánya and the enthusiasm of the fans brought him back to Hollósy's company.

In 1895-1896, he painted the colorfully dressed Šokci people in Transdanubia.

In 1897, in principle, he declared himself to be someone from Nagybánya and worked at the artist colony all summer. His longing for nature and his still unsettling search for himself led him here.

After such antecedents, he painted the biggest composition of his life, "Erzsébet Báthory", which was not received with sufficient understanding at home, and the promised state purchase was also missed. The fact that the painting won a first-class gold medal at the international exhibition in Munich in 1897 somewhat compensated the artist. Driven by the goal of failure, he chopped up and destroyed his large compositions from this period, which were mainly made in Nagybánya (God be with you, my love!, Christ and Venus - in other words: And deliver us from evil).

During this period, he explored folk motifs as part of his artistic development. He later married and relocated to Paris. In 1903, he returned to the French capital, where he spent the next seven years, a period often regarded as one of the most productive and stable phases of his life.

Impressionism

Influenced by French artists (Matisse, Maurice Denis, Van Dongen, Vlaminck, Derain), he painted the works titled "Műteremsarok" and "Thámár". The latter was purchased by the Italian state in 1911 at the Rome International Exhibition.

It was such a great success that the Minister of Public Education bought István Csók's self-portrait for the Uffizi gallery. Returning home from Paris in 1909, he achieved great success with his portrait of Tibor Wlassics in the Műcsarnok, then in 1917 in Pittsburgh, US.

Between 1921 and 1932, he was a teacher at the Academy of Fine Arts in Budapest. He regularly spent his summers in Transdanubia, Tolna and Baranya counties, and with his colorful pictures he made the picturesque costumes of the Sárköz and Öcsény peasants widely known (Öcsényi baptistry, 1902, Honeyeaters, Teknővájó cigányok, 1903).

From the summer of 1905, he mostly worked in the Mohács area. The sumptuous clothing of the many women, the freshness and bright lights of the countryside were an inexhaustible storehouse of new and new pictorial themes. Dáráz, probably inhabited by Sokács, appears several times in his paintings (Dáráz landscape-1905, Dáráz detail-1907). He spent most of his time here around 1909 (The bumblebee priest, The bumblebee head tree, At the bumblebee priest).

This period is also characterised by Csók's increased boldness with color and form, reflecting traits of then-late Post-Impressionism. The female nude featured more prominently in his paintings starting from the early 20th century. Csók moved back from Paris to Budapest in 1910, remaining there for the rest of his life.

In his paintings, he combined the instinctively developed color culture of folk motifs with the decorative order of painting that he unwittingly imbibed in Paris. During these years, he painted the "Züzü" series about his daughter, who, with her fresh, rosy face and cheerful dolls, offered herself as an almost constant painting subject. Its soaring light movement led the painter's color composition to an impressionistic resolution.

He often did not think that the color that a single bouquet could provide was enough, so he placed four or five colorful folk vases next to each other, filled with large-petaled flowers, in order to create a roaring orgy of color that filled the entire canvas. At other times, the decorative tablecloth exchanges dialogue with the festive bouquets placed on it.

Returning home, he won a state gold medal in 1911. (Wlassics portrait, Hungarian National Gallery).

In 1914, he presented his previous works at a collection exhibition in the Hall of Art. It was during this period that he painted his most beautiful and mature series of pictures. In 1920, he was elected president of the Szinyei Society.

Like most trans-Danubian painters, István Csók was inspired by Lake Balaton. In 1929-30, he depicted the Hungarian sea in several paintings, which particularly interested him with its wavy, storm-tossed shores. With his keen eye, Csók, a colorist, observed and recorded on canvas the water changing such a rich color scale in its turbulence.

From 1921 to 1932, he was a teacher at the College of Fine Arts.

Between 1925 and 1931, he painted his cycle of Balaton landscapes and several pictures of his daughter Züzü (Züzü with a rooster, 1912), as well as colorful compositions combining landscapes, portraits, and still life. In this third era, he reached the peak of his art in this country. From his early realism, partly influenced by Paris, he developed a colorful decorativeness close to the post-impressionists.

Until the outbreak of World War II, he worked with steady and developing strength, on new and old themes. However, the war curbed his enthusiasm and work ethic, which later only partially returned due to his advanced age.

After the liberation of Hungary, his artistic journey was accompanied by awards, the Kossuth Prize, and collection exhibitions. His best works were included in state collections.

On February 1st, 1961, István Csók died at the age of 95.

He was one of the few non-Italian artists whose self-portraits were displayed in the collection of the Uffizi Gallery as an honor. The majority of his works can be found in the Hungarian National Gallery, where, in 1965 was a memorial exhibition.

Today, a small museum preserves his memory in Cece, his childhood farm.

== His honors ==
Domestic:

- Grand prize of the National Hungarian Fine Arts Society for the picture 'Orphans'.
- 1905. Lipotváros casino prize for his picture Műteremsarok.
- 1910. Erzsébetváros casino prize for his picture 'Vampires'.
- 1911-1912. State large gold medal for the portrait of Tibor Wlassics.
- 1948. Kossuth Prize.
- 1950. Class V of the Order of Merit of the People's Republic.
- 1952. Title of outstanding artist.
- 1955. Order of Merit of the Hungarian People's Republic

Foreigners:

- 1889. Honorable Mention, Paris, for 'Potato peelers'.
- 1891. III. division gold medal in Paris Salon for the 'Lord's Supper'.
- 1894. Division I. gold medal in Antwerp for the 'Lord's Supper'.
- 1894. Vienna, state grand gold medal, for the 'Orphans'.
- 1897. Division I. gold medal in Munich for 'Báthori'.
- 1900. Gold medal in Paris for 'Báthori'.
- 1912. State Grand Gold Medal, Amsterdam.
- 1917. Grand Gold Medal, San Francisco.
- 1923. Officer's Cross of the Order of Lipót, Brussels
