= Samu Börtsök =

Hungarian landscape painter

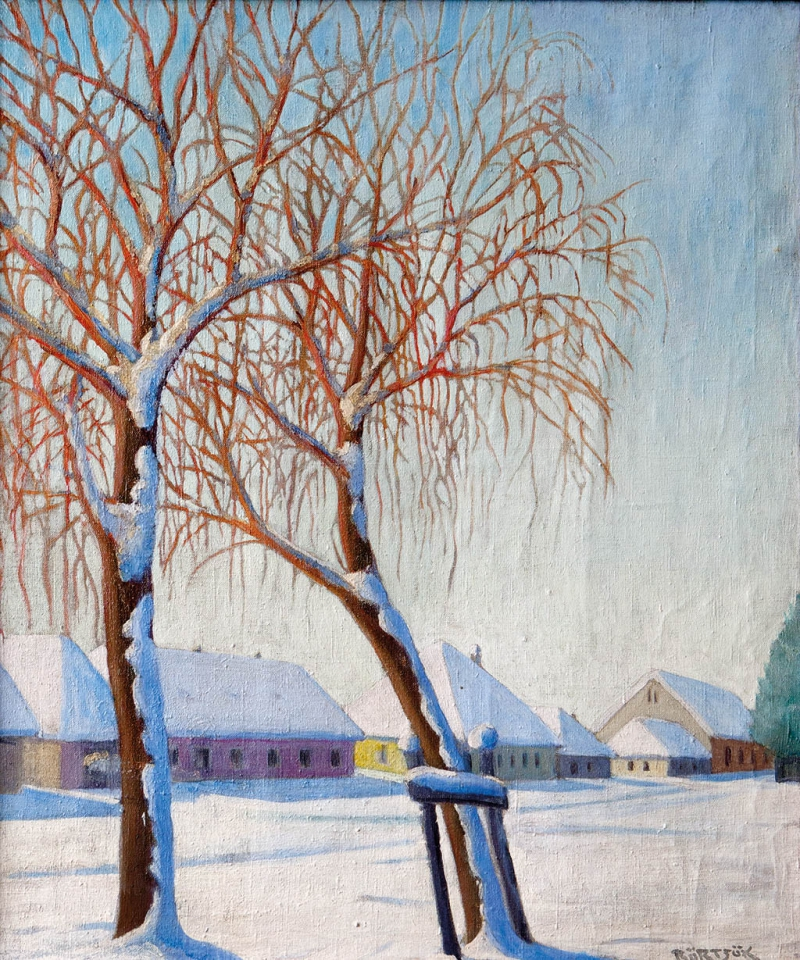
Winter Sunshine

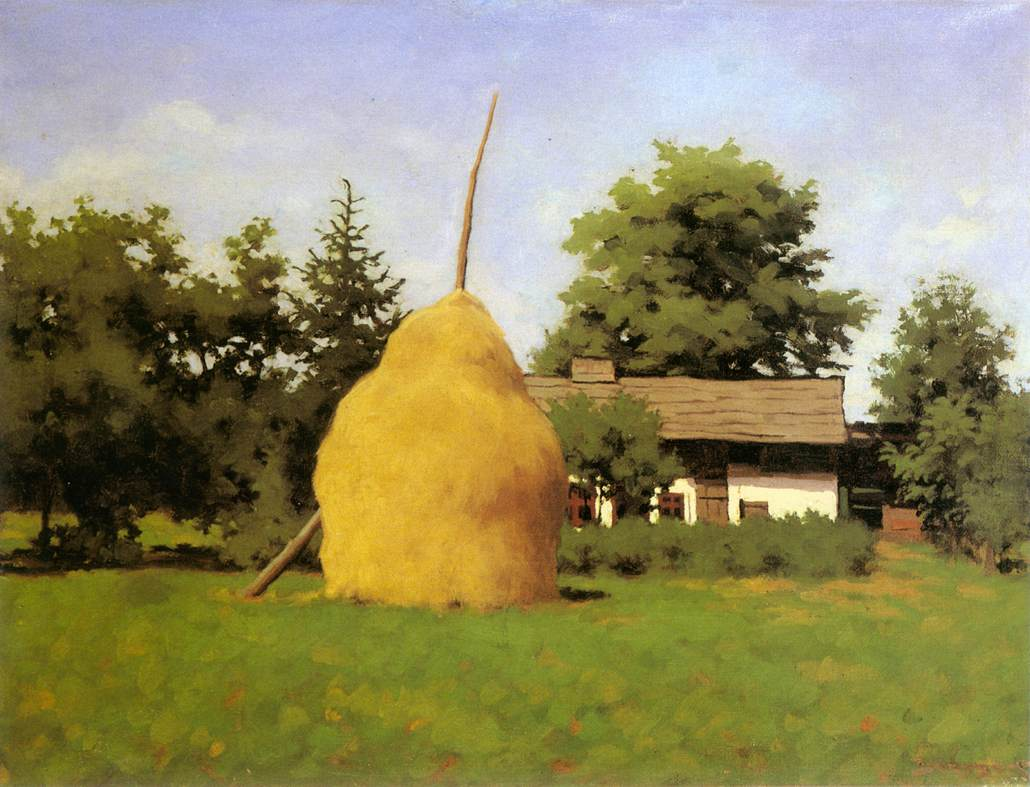
Farmhouse

Samu Börtsök (15 March 1881, Tápiószele - 19 June 1931, Budapest) was a Hungarian landscape painter.

== Biography ==
He began by studying law, but switched to art and became a student of István Réti at the Nagybánya artists' colony (now Baia Mare, Romania), where he also came under the influence of Simon Hollósy. In the winter of 1905, he worked at Károly Ferenczy's private school. The following year, he made a brief study tour through Paris, Vienna and Munich. Two years later, he held his first exhibition.

In 1908, he returned to Nagybánya, established himself there, and was among the first to open a permanent studio, although he continued to paint plein-air as the other artists did. Three years later, he became the Vice-President and Executive Chairman of the Nagybánya Painter's Society. In 1912, he and Réti created the first Nagybánya exhibition catalog. Ten years later, at Réti's request, he compiled a biographical directory of the colony's artists. He then became a teacher at the local art school in 1925.

Shortly after, however, he began to be seriously ill. As a young man, when he was briefly a member of the Hussars, he had been thrown from his horse, which then stepped on his stomach. He had suffered from bouts of illness ever since, but they now worsened significantly. In 1930, he moved his family to Budapest, seeking improved treatment, but died in 1931; apparently from lung failure. His widow had to sell his paintings to pay off their debts.
