= Nagybánya artists' colony =

Art colony in Austro-Hungarian Transylvania

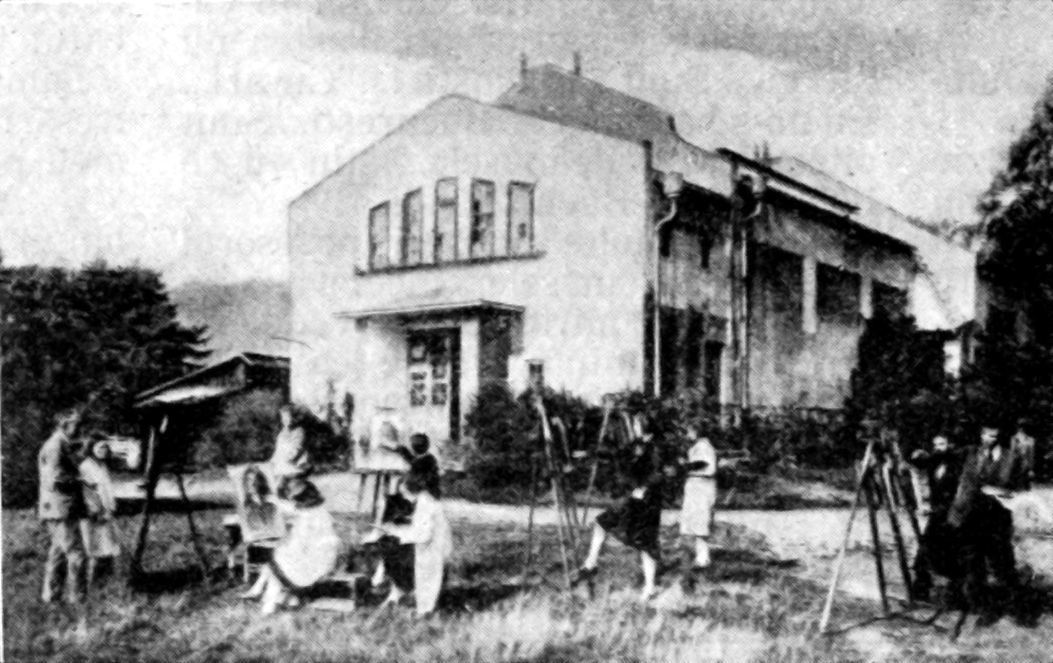
- Nagybánya artists' colony, 1930
- Formation: 1896
- Founder: Simon Hollósy
- Dissolved: 1937; 89 years ago
- Purpose: private art academy
- Location: Nagybánya, Austro-Hungarian Transylvania

The Nagybánya artists' colony was an art colony in Nagybánya, a town in eastern Hungary that became Baia Mare in Romania after World War I. The colony started as a summer retreat for artists, mainly painters from Simon Hollósy's szabadiskola (Free School) in Munich. The original group focused on plein-air painting.

It was Hollósy's idea to have a summer school in a small town. Fellow artists Károly Ferenczy, Béla Iványi-Grünwald, István Réti and János Thorma were involved with the founding of the artists' colony. The colony attracted many artists from Hungary interested in learning the plein-air style taught by Hollósy in the bright atmosphere of Nagybánya. The colony held its first exhibition in 1897 at the Műcsarnok. It was well received by some critics as reflecting the new and innovative style of European painting and ridiculed by other critics for its departure from traditional forms and techniques. Through the course of its existence the teachers and students worked in the emerging modern styles such as Expressionism, Fauvism, Cubism, and Symbolism. Some styles were adopted and some rejected, along with the allegiance of various artists.

Hollósy's influence at the colony was overtaken by the style of Károly Ferenczy. Hollósy departed around 1901 to open another school in Técső, Kingdom of Hungary (now western Ukraine). The colony in Nagybánya continued under the administration of the four remaining founders and renamed the Ingyenes festőiskola (Free Painting School). In 1910 founder Grünwald left to run the Kecskemét Artist's Colony in Kecskemét, Hungary. In the 1910s attendance at Nagybánya continued but lagged due to World War I and the difficulty of travel.

In 1927, the school was handed over to a new generation of painters and renamed Szépművészeti Iskola (School of Fine Arts). In 1935 the school property and colony was taken over by the town as part of the rise of the fascist Iron Guard. In 1937 the group dissolved. The property was used as a barracks for a time and attempts to revive the property as an art school were unsuccessful.

In 1966 the Hungarian National Gallery had retrospective titled The Art of Nagybánya. Centennial Exhibition in Celebration of the Artists' Colony in Nagybánya.

== Associated artists ==
- Ervin Baktay (Amrita Sher-Gil's uncle)
- Samu Börtsök
- Géza Bornemisza
- Zoltán Csáktornyai
- Antónia Csíkos
- István Csók
- Valéria Dénes
- Viktor Erdei
- József Faragó
- Károly Ferenczy
- Valér Ferenczy
- Béni Ferenczy
- Noémi Ferenczy
- Sándor Galimberti
- Oszkár Glatz
- Béla Iványi-Grünwald
- Simon Hollósy
- Béla Horthy
- Zoltán Jakab
- Iván Komoróczy
- János Krizsán
- Alexander Kubinyi
- Jenő Maticska
- András Mikola
- Sándor Nyilasy
- Vilmos Perlrott-Csaba
- Péter Rátz
- Károly Réthy
- István Réti
- János Thorma
- Ernő Béli Vörös
- Sándor Ziffer
- Goth Moricz
- P.Kovats Ferenc

== Gallery ==
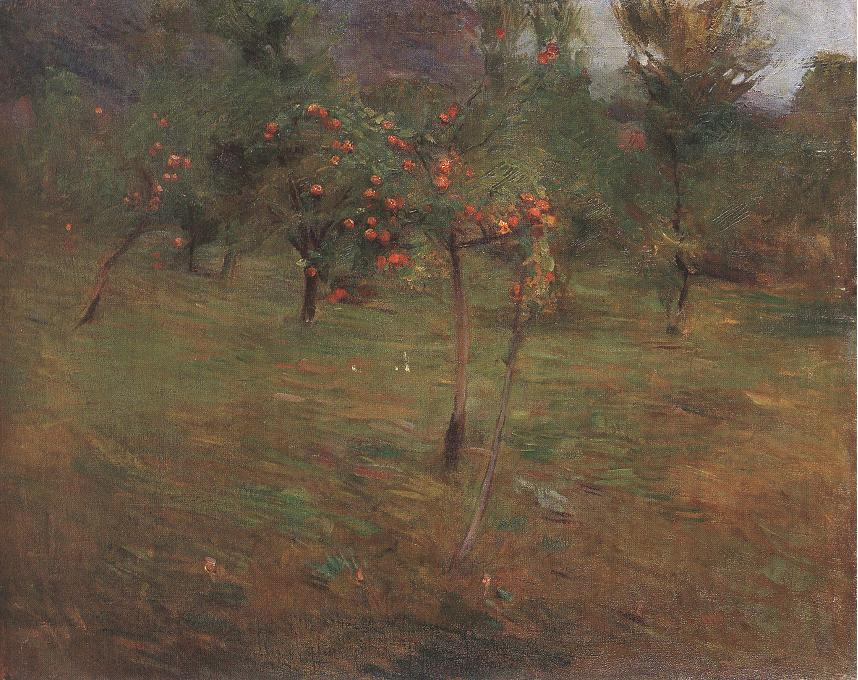
Simon Hollósy Autumn 1899

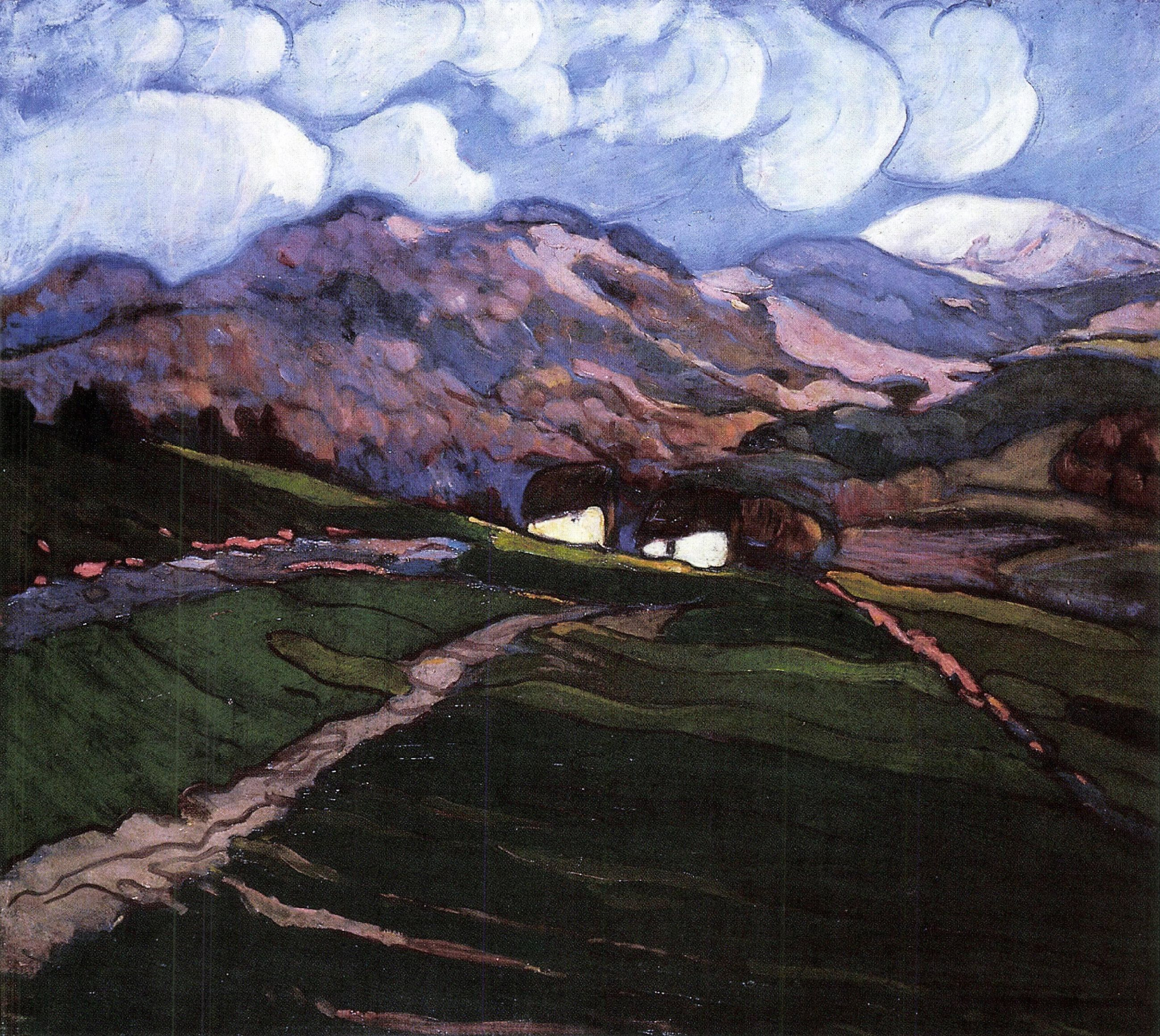
Béla Iványi-Grünwald View of Nagybánya with the River Gutin

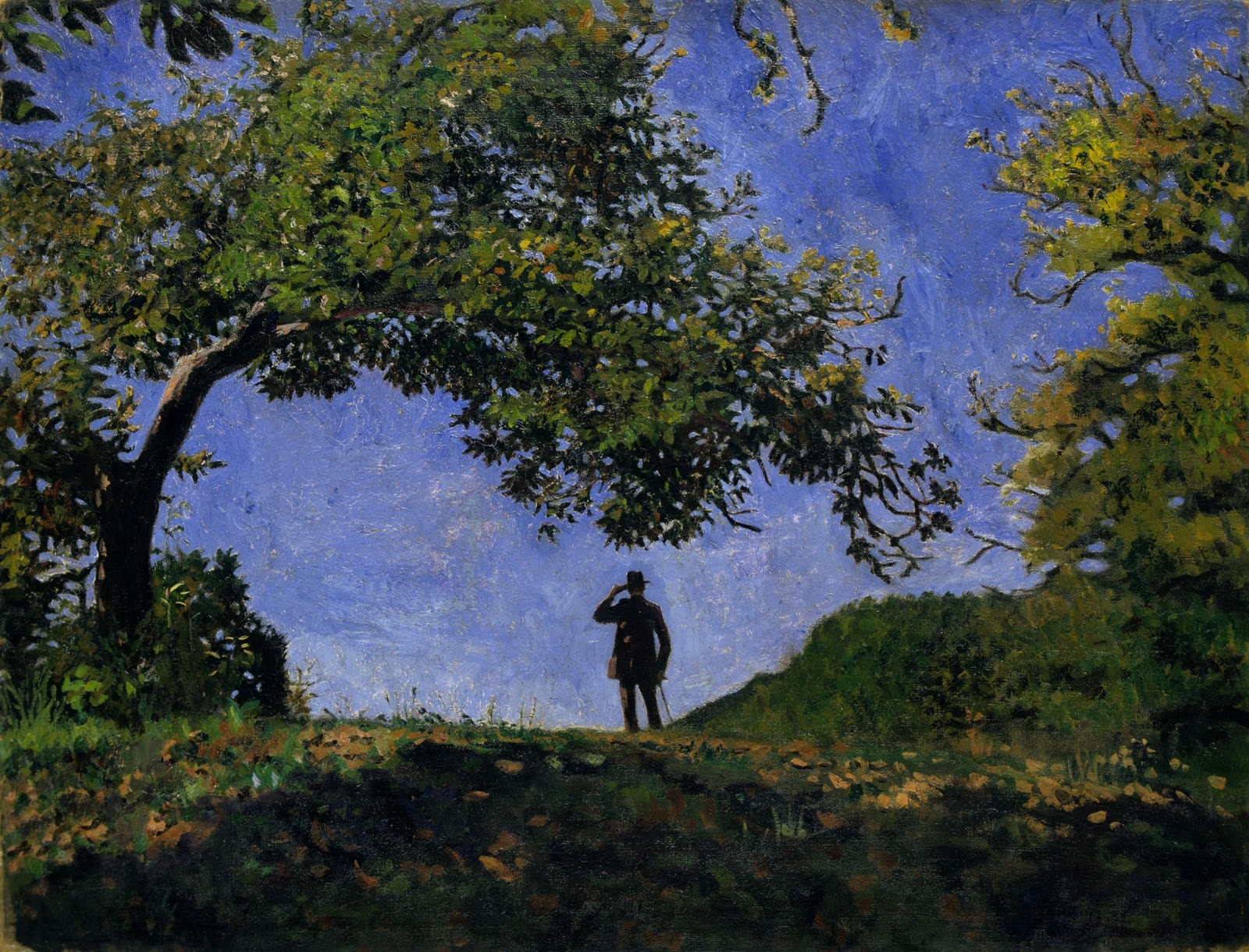
Károly Ferenczy On a Hilltop (1901)

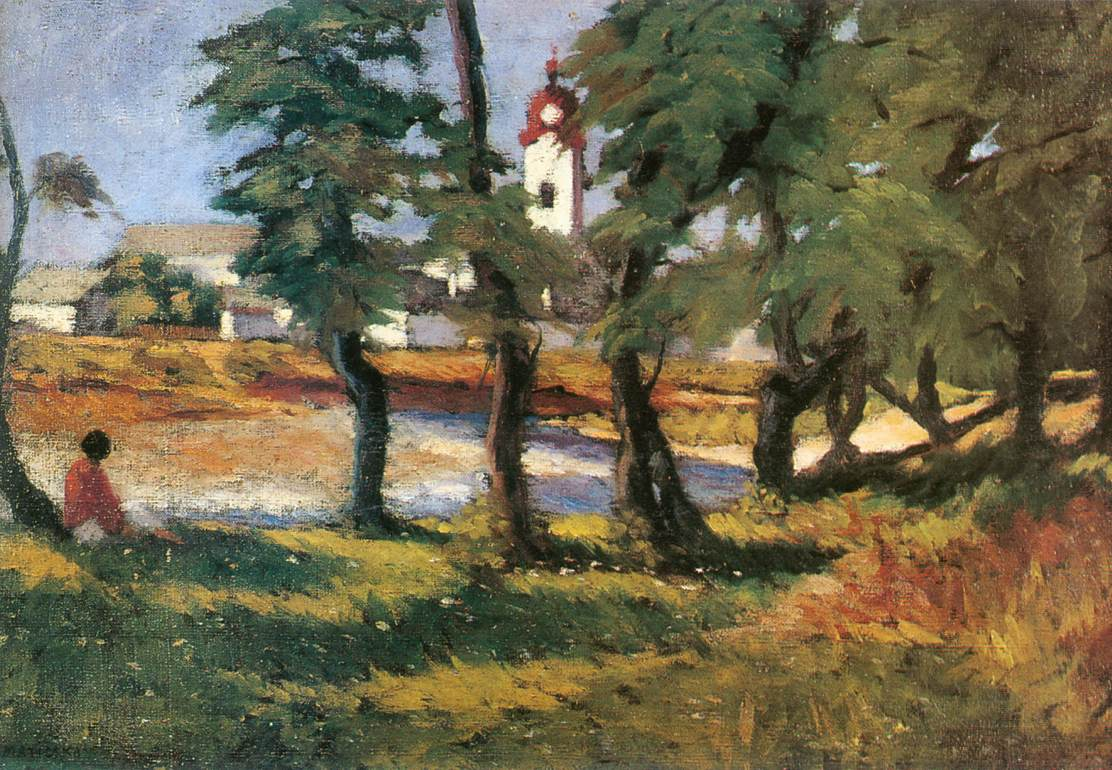
Jenő Maticska Nagybánya Landscape

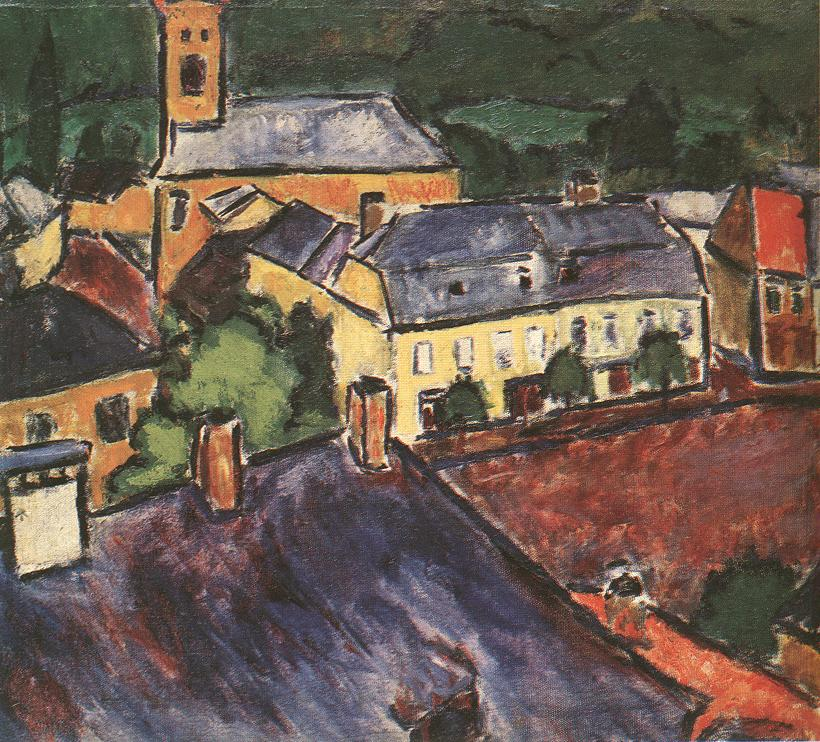
Sándor Galimberti Nagybánya, c. 1910

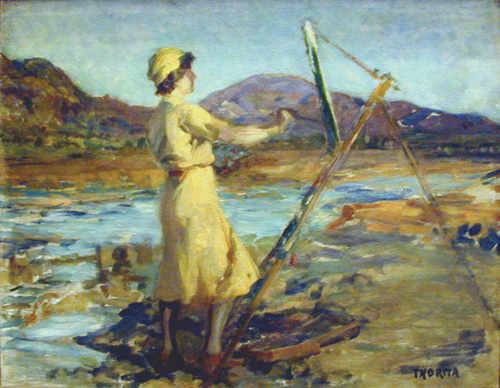
János Thorma Woman Painter 1934
