= János Gyarmati =

Hungarian footballer and manager

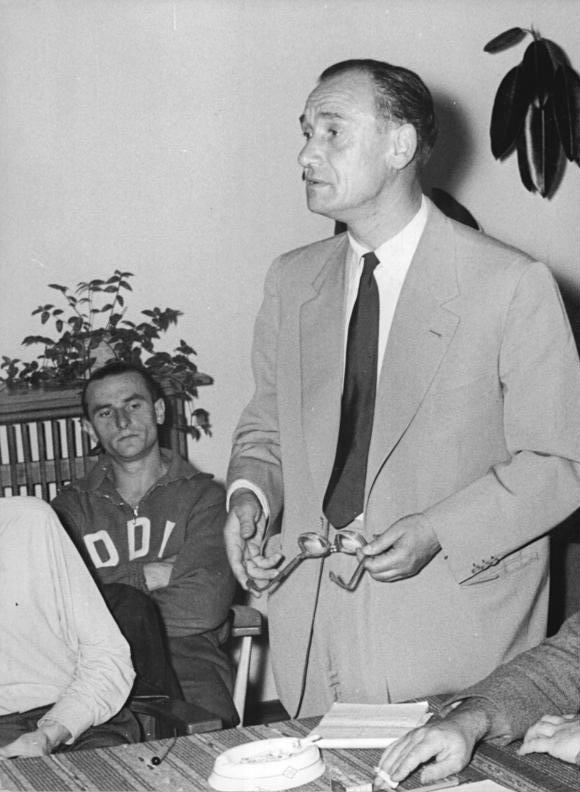
- Gyarmati with East Germany in 1955.

Personal information
- Date of birth: 8 February 1910
- Place of birth: tapioszele, Austria-Hungary
- Date of death: 29 August 1974 (aged 64)
- Place of death: Budapest, Hungary
- Position: Defender

Senior career*
Years	Team	Apps	(Gls)
- Szegedi FC

International career
1937–1938	Hungary	3	(0)

Managerial career
- 1953–1954: Dynamo Dresden
- 1955–1957: East Germany
- 1961–1963: SC Dynamo Berlin
- * Club domestic league appearances and goals

János Gyarmati (8 February 1910 – 29 August 1974) was a Hungarian footballer and coach. He played for Szeged FC, and won three caps for Hungary between 1937 and 1938. He later coached in East Germany, managing VP Dresden, DHfK Leipzig, Vorwärts Berlin and SC Dynamo Berlin, as well as coaching the East Germany national team from 1955 to 1957.
