= Noémi Ferenczy =

Hungarian artist

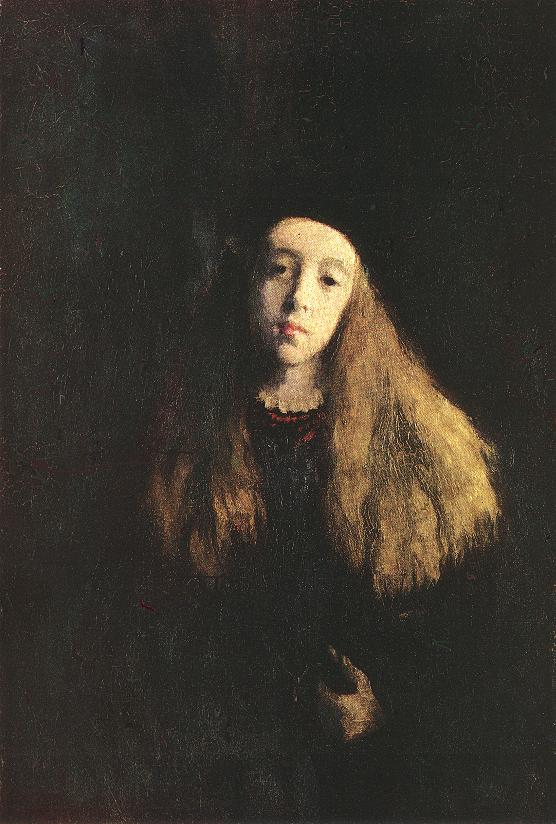
- A portrait of the young Noémi Ferenczy by her father
- Born: Noémi Ferenczy; 18 June 1890; Szentendre
- Died: 20 December 1957 (aged 67); Budapest
- Resting place: Kerepesi Cemetery
- Known for: tapestry designs
- Parents: Károly Ferenczy (father); Olga Fialka (mother)
- Relatives: Béni Ferenczy (twin sister)

Noémi Ferenczy (18 June 1890 – 20 December 1957) was a Hungarian artist, best known for her tapestry designs. She wove her own tapestries, and was influenced by the Nagybánya artists' colony movement.

She was born in Szentendre, the twin sister of sculptor Béni Ferenczy. They were the children of the artists Károly Ferenczy and Olga Fialka. The Ferenczy Museum in Szentendre was founded in order to hold artworks by the family as well as other artists. Noémi became a socialist, and this is reflected in the political themes of some of her work.

She produced watercolours and sketches which were mostly turned into designs for tapestry and carpets. In addition to developing designs for Gobelin-style tapestries, Noémi Ferenczy taught the art to others, resulting in a trend for tapestry in Hungary during the 1950s and 1960s.

She died in Budapest, aged 67, and is buried, along with her parents and her brother Béni, in the Kerepesi Cemetery. A portrait of Noémi and Béni at the age of eighteen, painted by their father, hangs in the Hungarian National Gallery. A Ferenczy Noemi Prize is awarded by the Hungarian Ministry of Cultural Heritage.

== Works ==
- "Bricklayers"
- "Shingle Maker"
- "Flight to Egypt" (1916)
- "Harangvirágok" (1921)
- "Nővérek" (1921)
- "Kertésznők" (1923)
- "Woman Carrying Faggots" (c.1925)
- "Weaving Woman" (c.1930)
- "Szövőnő" (1933)
- "Kőműves, Házépítő, Pék" (1933)
- "Woman Watering Flowers" (1934)
- "Sisterhood" (c.1942)
