= Tápiószele =

Town in Hungary

Coordinates: 47°20′N 19°53′E

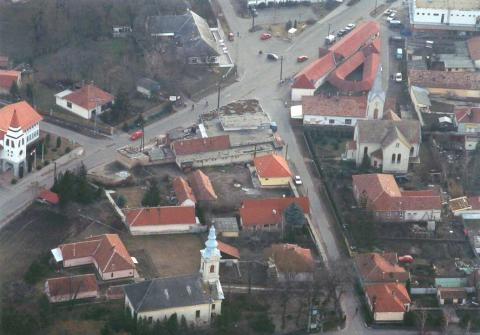
Tápiószele

Tápiószele is a town in Pest county, Hungary.

== Notable residents ==
- Marcsa Simon (1882–1954), actress
- Samu Börtsök (1881–1931), painter
- János Gyarmati (1910–1974), footballer and football coach
