= Olga Fialka =

Austrian-Czech artist (1848–1930)

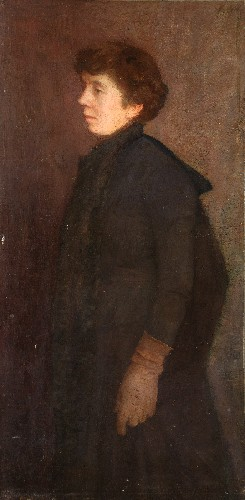
- Portrait of the Artist's Wife 1892 by Károly Ferenczy
- Born: 19 April 1848; Theresienstadt, Bohemia, Austrian Empire
- Died: 17 December 1930 (aged 82); Baia Mare, Romania
- Known for: Painting
- Spouse: Károly Ferenczy
- Parent: Moric Fialka (father)

Olga Fialka (19 April 1848 – 17 December 1930) was an Austrian-Czech artist and matriarch of the Ferenczy family of artists.

== Biography ==
Olga Fialka was born on 19 April 1848 in Theresienstadt, Bohemia, Austrian Empire (now Terezín, Czech Republic). She studied painting under Jan Matejko in Kraków. She went on to study under August Eisenmenger in Vienna. She created paintings and book illustrations. Around 1884, she married Károly Ferenczy with whom she had three children. Fialka turned her attention away from art and focused on raising her children. The couple's first child Valér Ferenczy (1885–1954) became a painter and printmaker. In 1890 their twins were born. Béni Ferenczy (1890–1967) became a sculptor and Noémi Ferenczy (1890–1957) became a textile artist.

Fialka died on 17 December 1930 in Baia Mare, Romania.

== Gallery ==
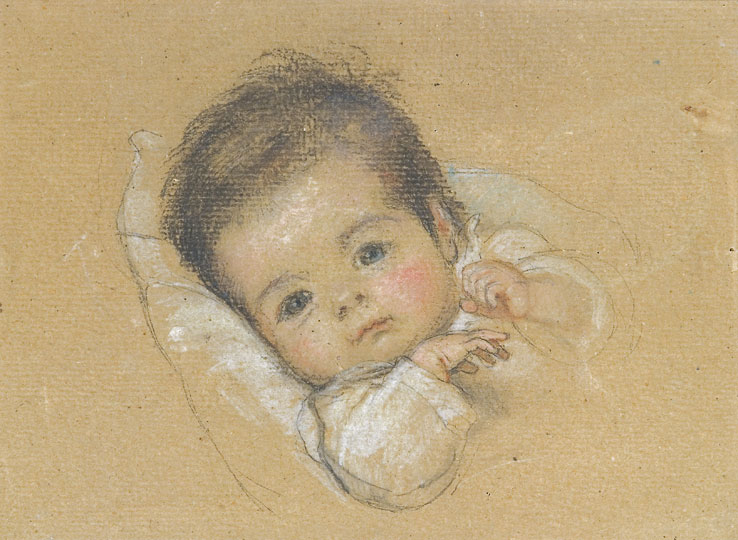
Portrait of Béni Ferenczy

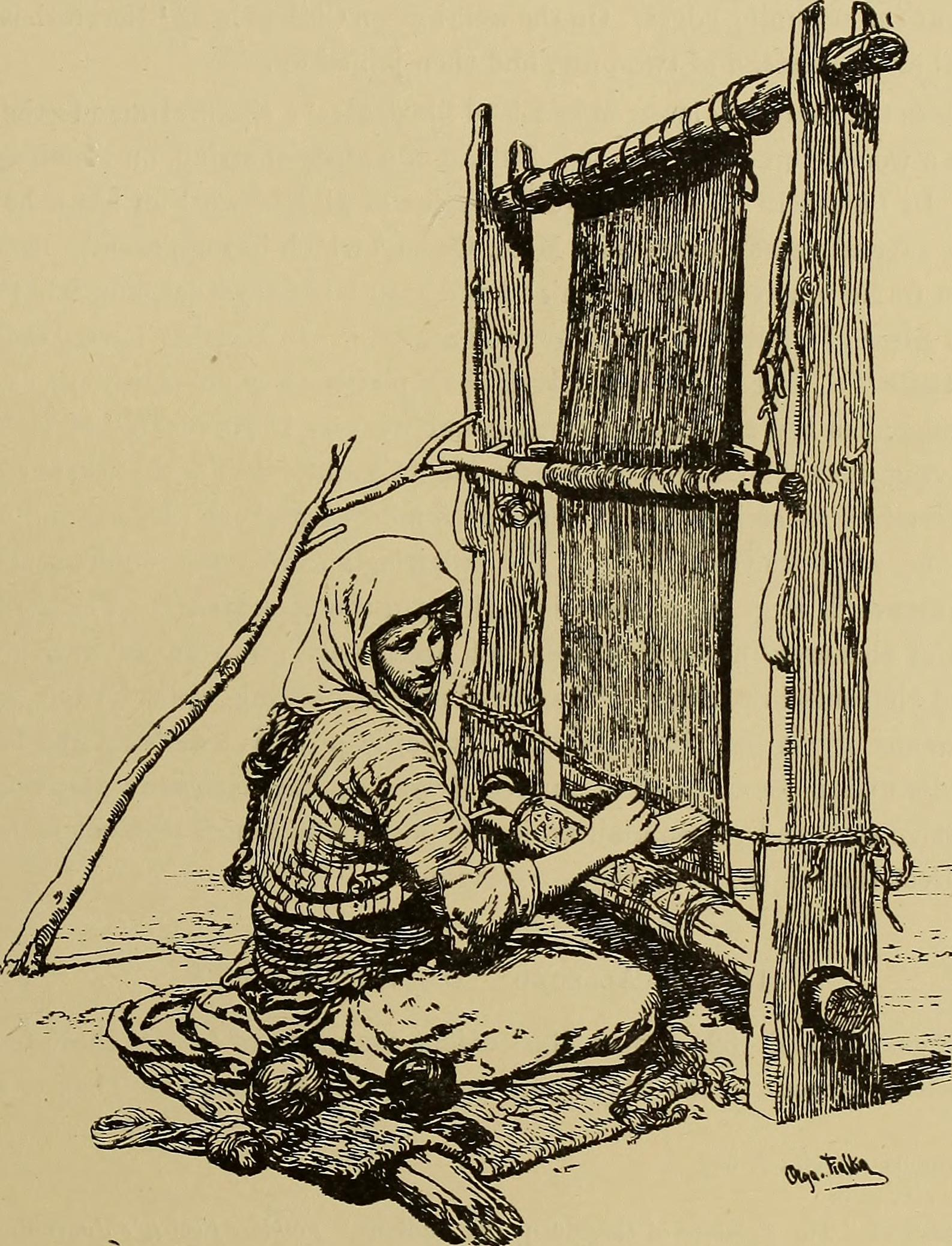
Studies in primitive looms 1918
