= Tibor Wlassics =

Hungarian scholar (1936–1998)

- Born: Tibor Ivan Wlassics; 1936; Budapest, Hungary
- Died: 28 October 1998 (aged 61–62); Charlottesville, Virginia, United States

Academic background
- Education: University of Genoa; Columbia University

Academic work
- Discipline: Italian literature
- Institutions: University of Pittsburgh; University of Virginia

Tibor Ivan Wlassics (Hungarian pronunciation: [ˈtibor ˈivaːn vlɒʃːit͡ʃ]; 1936 – 28 October 1998) was a Hungarian scholar of Italian literature. He fled Hungary after the 1956 revolution and eventually settled in the United States, becoming a professor at the University of Virginia. He is most remembered for his research on the poet Dante Alighieri, though he also wrote about Italian figures such as Galileo Galilei and Cesare Pavese.

== Biography ==
Wlassics was born in Budapest, Hungary in 1936 to an aristocratic family. After World War II and the formation of the Hungarian People's Republic, his father was imprisoned for refusing to give up his title and mansion. Though Wlassics was well-educated, he was not allowed to attend university because of his upper-class status, instead working first in manual labour and then in translation. One of the works he translated into Hungarian during this time was Federico García Lorca's Romancero gitano.

After the Revolution of 1956, Wlassics fled to Austria and then settled in Italy. Despite not knowing any Italian upon arrival, he went on to receive a laurea in Italian literature from the University of Genoa. He earned money while studying by taking trips to Rhode Island to work with his uncle as an oxygen therapist. He eventually settled with his family in New Brunswick, New Jersey, enrolling at Columbia University and receiving a doctorate in 1967. He began working as a professor at the University of Pittsburgh the next year. In 1981, Wlassics became a visiting professor at the University of Virginia and a year later joined their staff full time. While there, he established their Master of Arts program in Italian studies.

== Work and reception ==
Much of the career of Wlassics was devoted to the study of the Italian poet Dante Alighieri. While at the University of Virginia, Wlassics founded Lectura Dantis, a journal of "Dante research and interpretation" that ran twice a year and wrote an original translation of Dante's Inferno. From 1990 to 1995, Wlassics published a series of Introductory Readings for Dante's Divine Comedy, which was praised by a colleague as "the first complete, multivoice series in English of readings for the Commedia."

Wlassics was also considered an expert on other Italian figures such as Galileo Galilei, Giovanni Verga, and Cesare Pavese. One academic wrote that his work on the latter "revolutionized the field of Pavese studies".

== Legacy ==
Wlassics died on 28 October 1998. He received in-depth obituaries in the Dante Society of America's journal Dante Studies and in the journal Italica. The University of Virginia's Department of Spanish, Italian, and Portuguese has held an ongoing Tibor Wlassics Faculty Lecture Series since 1984.

== Awards and honours ==
- Guggenheim Fellowship, 1986
- William R. Kenan Professorship, 1988
- Torino Prize, 1988, for Pavese falso e vero
- Honorary President of the American Association for Italian Studies, 1996–1997

== Selected publications ==
- Wlassics, Tibor (1972). Interpretazioni di prosodia dantesca (in Italian). Rome: A. Signorelli. OCLC 575773486.
- — (1974). Da Verga a Sanguineti: microcosmi critici (in Italian). Catania: N. Giannotta. OCLC 2407632.
- — (1974). Galilei critico letterario (in Italian). Ravenna: Longo. ISBN 978-88-8063-945-9.
- — (1975). Dante narratore saggi sullo stile della Commedia (in Italian). Florence: L.S. Olschki. OCLC 489636892.
- — (1985). Pavese falso e vero: vita, poetica, narrativa (in Italian). Turin: Centro studi piemontesi. OCLC 12958617.
- — (1986). Nel mondo dei Malavoglia: saggi verghiani (in Italian). Pisa: Giardini. OCLC 16413586.
- — (1995). Dante's Divine Comedy: Introductory Readings. Charlottesville, VA: University of Virginia Press. OCLC 264897823.
