= Béni Ferenczy =

Hungarian sculptor and graphic artist (1890–1967)

Béni Ferenczy (18 June 1890 – 2 June 1967) was a Hungarian sculptor, medalist, and graphic artist.

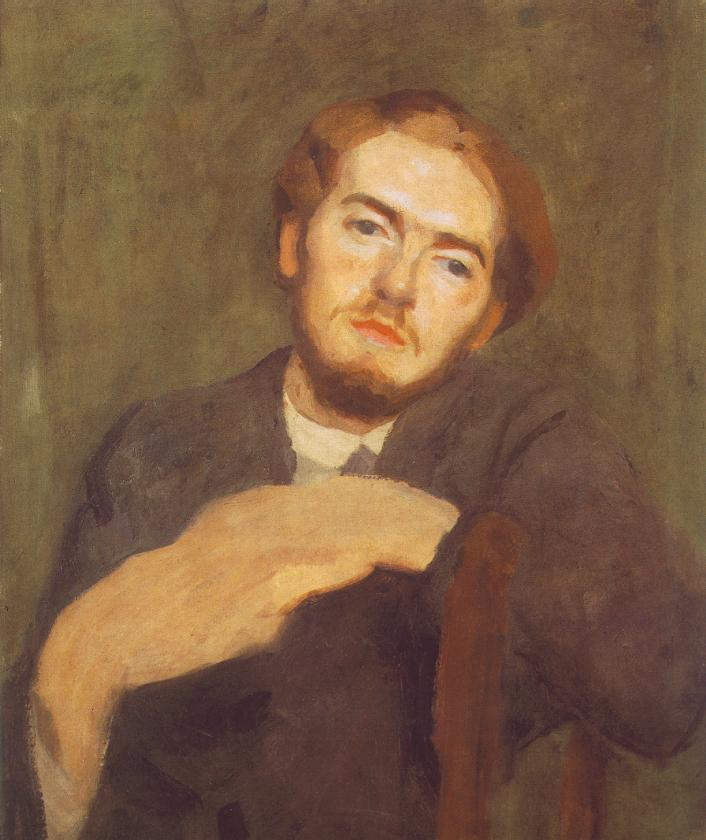
Károly Ferenczy painter (1862-1917) Portrait of Béni Ferenczy 1912

== Early life and education ==
Béni Ferenczy was born in 1890 in Szentendre, Hungary, the second son of Károly Ferenczy and Olga Fialka, both painters. His sister Noémi was his fraternal twin. All three of the children became artists: Valér was a painter, Béni a sculptor and Noémi a weaver.

As a young man, Ferenczy went to Munich and Paris to study art, as did many artists from Hungary since the late nineteenth century. In the latter city, he studied with both Antoine Bourdelle and Archipenko.

== Career ==
Later in his career, Ferenczy also worked in Germany and the Soviet Union, for a time.

After his experiences with cubism first and with expressionism later, his art evolved in sculptures with emphasized forms. While a highly talented sculptor he was one of the most accomplished graphic artists in Hungary of the period. He also illustrated many books.

== Marriage and family ==
He married Erzsi (Elizabeth) (c.1904-2000) in 1932. She was his close companion, an inspiration for his work and a frequent model of his.

Ferenczy died in 1967 in Budapest.

== Erzsi Ferenczy ==
After his death, Erzsi Ferenczy worked to preserve her husband's work and memory. She died in 2000 at the age of 96.

== Legacy and honours ==
- 1972, Erzsi Ferenczy founded the Ferenczy Museum in Szentendre, with holdings that included artwork by each member of the family.
- In 1993, Erzsi established the Ferenczy Family Foundation.
