= István Réti =

Hungarian artist

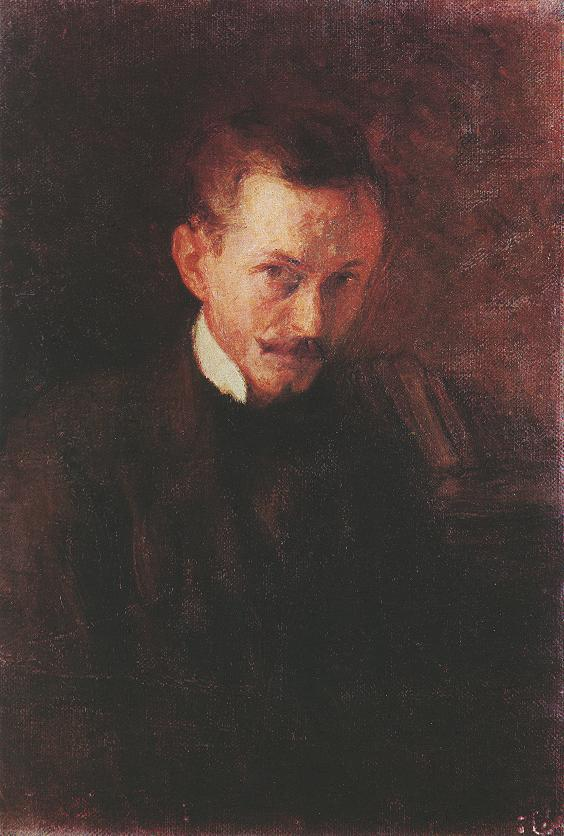
Self-portrait, 1898

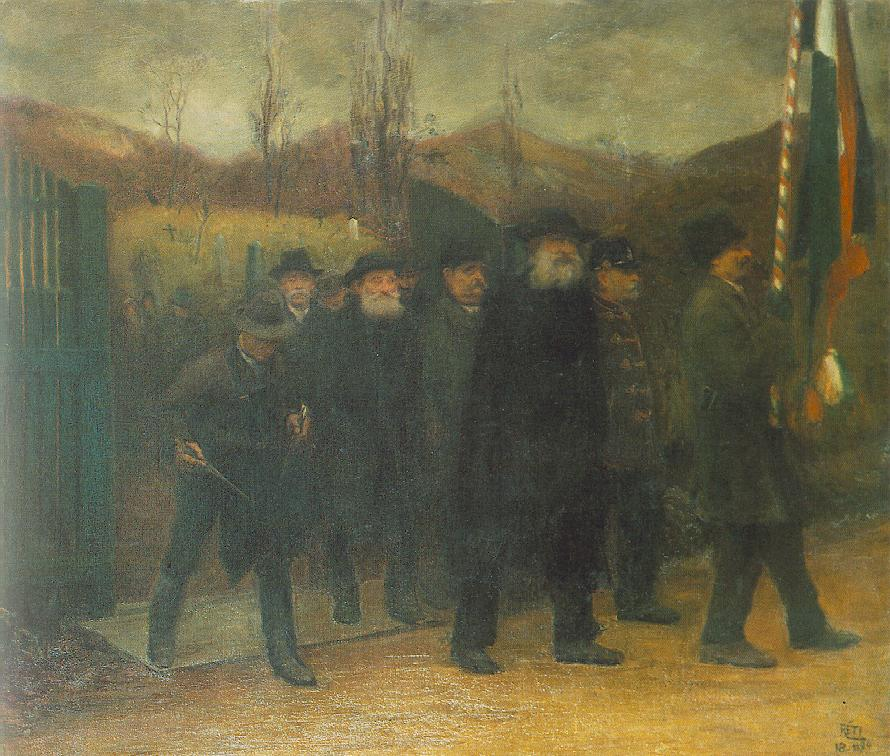
Burial of a Hungarian Soldier (1899)

István Réti (26 December 1872 – 17 January 1945) was a Hungarian painter, professor, art historian and leading member, as well as a founder and theoretician, of the Nagybánya artists' colony, located in what is present-day Baia Mare, Romania. In addition, he served as president of the Hungarian University of Fine Arts (1927–1931) and (1932–1935).

The artists' colony and its school were considered very influential in Hungarian and Romanian art; in 1966 the Hungarian National Gallery had a major exhibition of their work: The Art of Nagybánya. Centennial Exhibition in Celebration of the Artists' Colony in Nagybánya.

== Early life and education ==
István Réti was born in Nagybánya, Austria-Hungary (today Baia Mare, Romania). In 1890 at the age of 18, he began his studies at the Budapest School of Drawing in 1890 but left after a month.

In 1891 he went to Munich, where he studied with Simon Hollósy, a young Hungarian painter who had established free classes, as he objected to the technical training at the more conservative Munich Academy. Réti met other young artists here who became part of his circle when they returned to Hungary. Later Réti also studied in Paris at the Académie Julian, to which many other painters were attracted from Hungary.

== Career ==
Returning to Nagybánya, Réti painted his first significant work, Bohémek karácsonyestje idegenben (Christmas Night of the Bohemians Abroad) (1893). This nostalgic lamplit interior, typical of the period, was exhibited at the Palace of Art in Budapest and purchased by the state.

In 1894 Réti travelled to Turin, Italy. There he painted Kossuth Lajos a ravatalon ("Lajos Kossuth on His Bier"); the revolutionary had just died there. Réti was attracted by the work of Jules Bastien-Lepage. During an 1895 trip to Paris, he learned about the work of Pierre Puvis de Chavannes.

Together with János Thorma, Réti helped persuade Hollósy to move his school from Munich to Nagybánya. In 1896 Réti was one of the founders of the artists' colony there. Starting in 1902, he served as a professor at its free painting academy, and in 1911 he was one of the founders of the Nagybánya Painters' Association.

Although Réti moved to Budapest in 1913 to teach at what is now the University of Fine Arts, he continued making improvements to the Nagybánya school during the summers. He taught summer classes there through 1927.

From 1920 Réti worked to reform the University of Fine Arts according to Nagybánya principles, together with Károly Lyka. He served as its president from 1927–1931 and from 1932–1935. He retired in 1938.

Réti spent the last decade of his life writing a history of the Nagybánya artists' colony. He died in Budapest.

== Artistic work ==
In his first phase as a painter, Réti was chiefly interested in light and interiors, especially lamps or sunlight streaming through windows, as shown in Gyötrődés (Cacophony), 1894; Öregasszonyok (Old Women, 1900); and Kenyérszelés (Slicing the Bread, 1906).

He did not adopt the plein air landscape painting programme at Nagybánya. In 1899 he produced one of his best-known canvases, Honvédtemetés (Burial of a Hungarian Soldier), which referred to the 1848 revolution; the unity of the landscape and people is bound together by the grey of the dusk.

From 1904–07 (the last two years working in Rome), Réti painted several versions of Krisztus apostolok között (Christ with the Apostles), his most significant religious work. After 1910 he created several decorative paintings, such as Cigánylány (The Gypsy Girl, 1912), and many portraits and self-portraits, including one of Lajos Kossuth in 1931.

In his later years, Réti worked relatively slowly, taking long breaks between paintings and undertaking theoretical preparation for each new one. His oeuvre from this period is considered inconsistent. As he concentrated on teaching, his works diminished in both quality and quantity.

From an early age, Réti was preoccupied by contemporary questions of artistic theory, which he also tried to explore as a professor. After 1920, particularly, he wrote more articles on these subjects. Scholars consider his writings on aesthetics, influenced by Benedetto Croce and Henri Bergson, to have had a more profound effect on other artists than did his painting or teaching activities.

== Exhibits ==
- 2009, Munich in Hungarian, Hungarian Artists in Munich 1850–1914, 2 Oct. 2009 – Jan. 2010, Hungarian National Gallery.

== Legacy and honors ==
- 1966, The Art of Nagybánya. Centennial Exhibition in Celebration of the Artists' Colony in Nagybánya, Hungarian National Gallery.

== See also ==
- Simon Hollósy
- Károly Ferenczy
- János Thorma

== Works ==
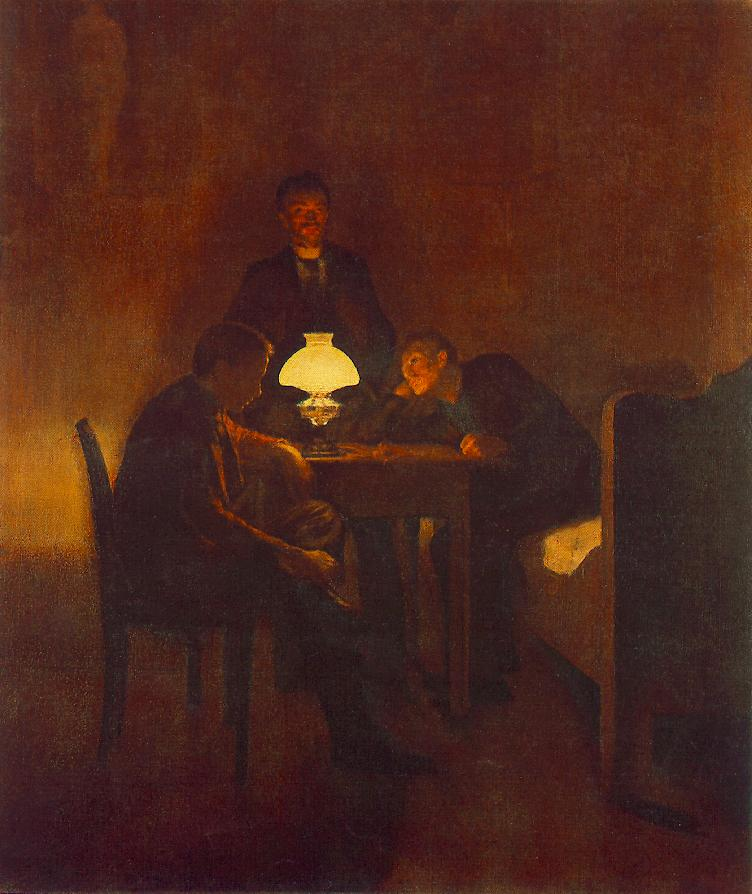
Christmas Night of the Bohemians Abroad (1893)

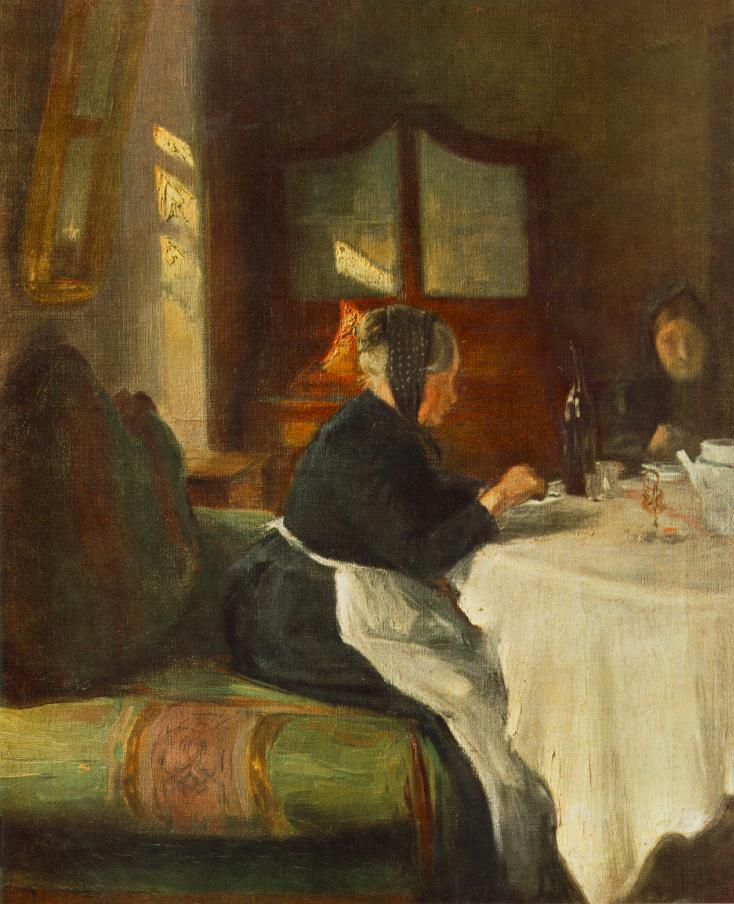
Old Women (1900)

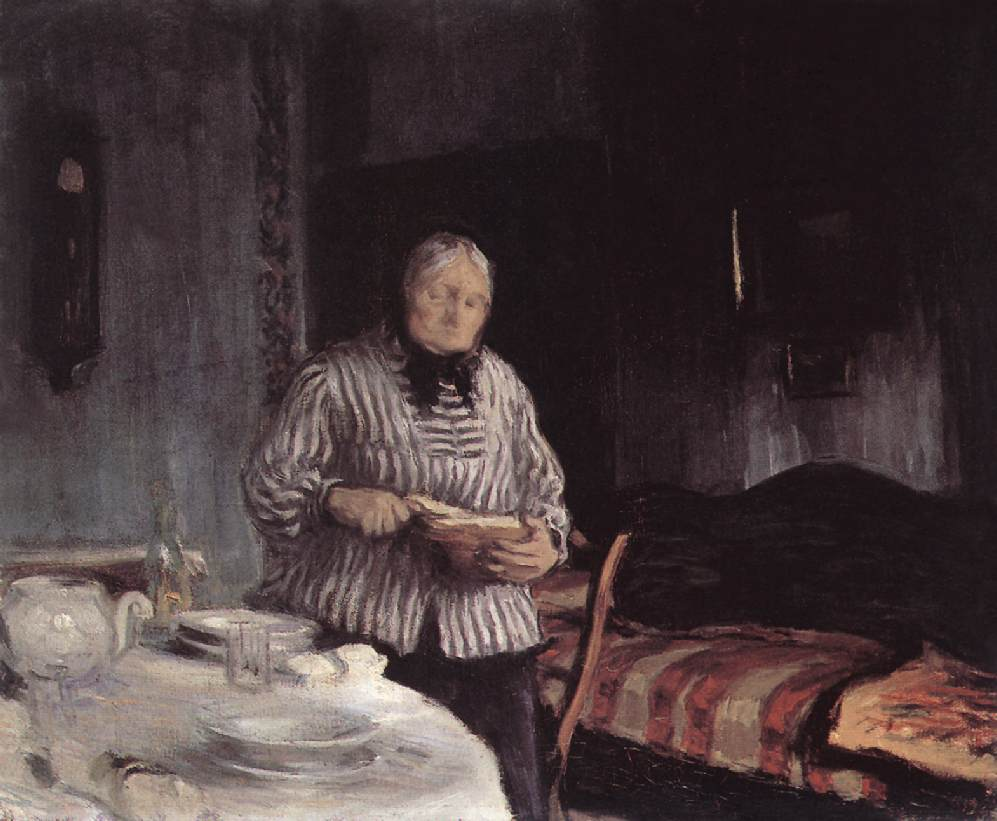
Slicing the Bread (1906)

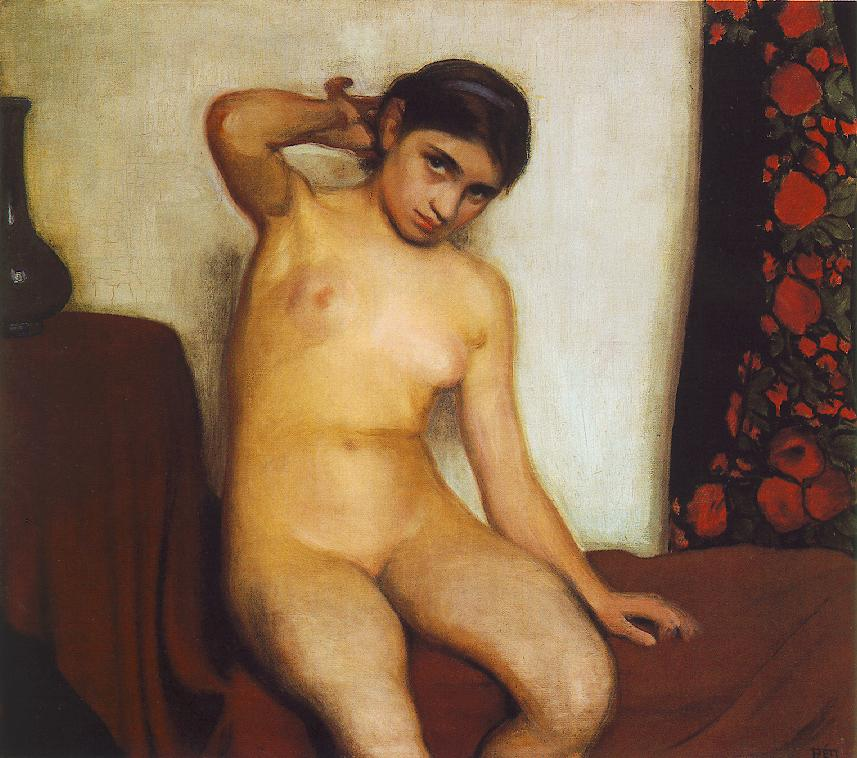
Gypsy Girl (1912)
