= Károly Ferenczy =

Hungarian painter

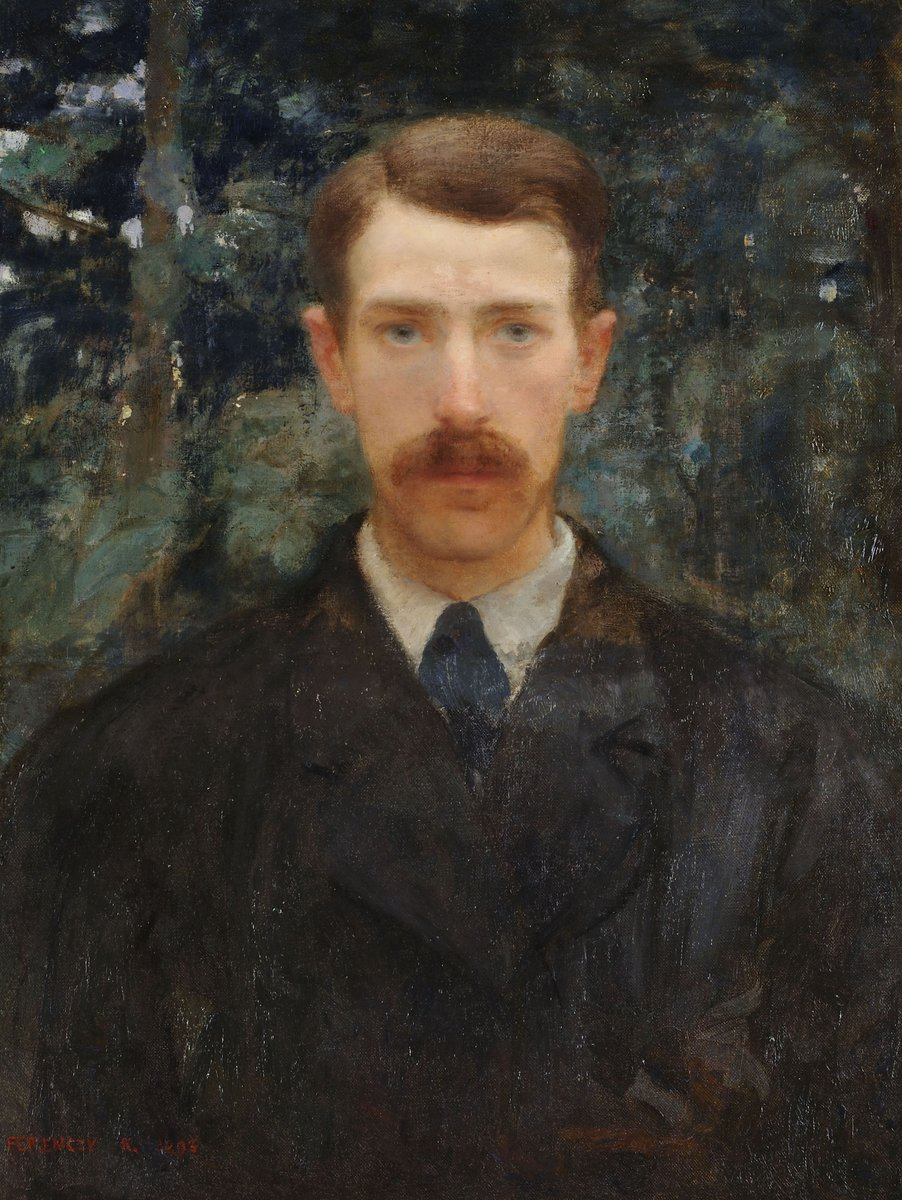
Self-portrait (1893)

Károly Ferenczy (February 8, 1862 – March 18, 1917) was a Hungarian painter and leading member of the Nagybánya artists' colony.

He was among several artists who went to Munich for study in the late nineteenth century, where he attended free classes by the Hungarian painter, Simon Hollósy. Upon his return to Hungary, Ferenczy helped found the artists colony in 1896, and became one of its major figures. Ferenczy is considered the "father of Hungarian impressionism and post-impressionism" and the "founder of modern Hungarian painting".

He has been collected by the Hungarian National Gallery, which holds 51 of his paintings, as well as other major and regional institutions, including the Ferenczy Károly Museum, founded in his birthplace of Szentendre, and private collectors.

In 1966 the Hungarian National Gallery had a major exhibition of the colony's work: The Art of Nagybánya. Centennial Exhibition in Celebration of the Artists' Colony in Nagybánya. In November 2011, it opened a large retrospective of Ferenczy, featuring him for six months, to enable more viewers to appreciate the breadth of his work.

== Early life and education ==
Károly Ferenczy was born in 1862 in Vienna, Austria. His mother died soon after he was born. He first studied law and completed a degree from the College of Economy.

His future wife, Olga Fialka, encouraged Ferenczy to explore painting and he traveled in Italy. After studying in Paris in 1887 and starting to paint in Hungary, in 1893 he took his young family to Munich. They lived there until 1896, while he studied with the Hungarian painter Simon Hollósy and the circle of young artists around him.

== Marriage and family ==
He married Olga Fialka, also a painter. He went to study at the Académie Julian in Paris in 1887. In 1889 he and his wife settled in Szentendre, a small town near Budapest. They had two sons and a daughter together: Valér (b. 1888) and Béni and Noémi, fraternal twins born in 1890. Olga gave up her painting to support her family and husband's career.

Among Ferenczy's 51 works held by the Hungarian National Gallery are portraits of his children, including one of Béni as a young adult, and one of Noémi and Béni at age 18. All three children became artists; Valér became a painter, Noémi founded modern Hungarian tapestry, in which she became a "master", and Béni Ferenczy became a sculptor.

== Career ==
In Hungary, Ferenczy started painting in a naturalistic style, as he had been influenced by Jules Bastien-Lepage. Seeking more training, he took his young family with him to Munich in 1893, the art center of Central and Eastern Europe. They lived there until 1896. There he encountered Simon Hollósy, a Hungarian painter not much older than he, who ran free classes that were more open to new influences than those at the Munich Academy. Hollósy encouraged an appreciation of French painters and their techniques, including en plein air painting. Ferenczy met the young Hungarian artists István Réti and János Thorma in Hollosy's circle in Munich, and the men collaborated on their ideas.

Returning to Hungary in 1896, Ferenczy joined Réti and Thorma at Nagybánya, and they persuaded Hollósy to bring his classes there. They founded an artists' colony in Nagybánya (today Baia Mare, Romania) where they taught and mentored many Hungarian artists. Even in the first years, Ferenczy had a studio in Budapest during the winter, which he maintained throughout his career.

Ferenczy's first exhibit in 1903 in Budapest marked his entry into making a living as an artist. In 1906, the painter was offered a teaching position at the Hungarian Royal Drawing School, now the Hungarian University of Fine Arts. He returned to Nagybanya in summers to teach, and has been strongly associated with the colony.

His studio paintings were most important to his art, and he painted a traditional array of genres: nudes, still lifes, the urban scenes of circus performers. By his own work and his teaching, Ferenczy is considered the "father of Hungarian impressionism and post-impressionism" and the "founder of modern Hungarian painting."

In his later years, Ferenczy painted subjects ranging from portraits, to nudes, and Biblical scenes. In this period, "[t]he reconciliation of the abstract aesthetic ideal with sensual beauty became a central concern of his art."

Ferenczy was highly productive, and he worked in a variety of materials and genres. In November 2011, a major retrospective exhibition opened for six months at the Hungarian National Gallery, featuring nearly 150 paintings and 80 prints and drawings, together with about 50 documents (photographs, letters, catalogues and books) related to his art and life. It was the first major exhibit of his work in nearly a century. The works were drawn from private holdings as well as public collections.

== Exhibits ==
- 2011, The Retrospective Exhibition of Károly Ferenczy (1862–1917), 30 November 2011 – 17 June 2012, Hungarian National Gallery.
- 2009, "Munich in Hungarian, Hungarian Artists in Munich 1850–1914, 2 Oct. 2009 – Jan. 2010", Hungarian National Gallery.
- 1991–1992, Standing in the Storm: The Hungarian Avant-Garde from 1908–1930, Santa Barbara Museum of Art, Santa Barbara, California.
- 1966, The Art of Nagybánya. Centennial Exhibition in Celebration of the Artists' Colony in Nagybánya.

== Legacy and honours ==
- 1972, the Ferenczy Museum was founded in Szentendre, to honour all the artists in the family, an effort led by his daughter-in-law Erszi Ferenczy, widow of Béni (it is now named the Ferenczy Károly Múzeum, after the most prominent member).
- 1993, the Ferenczy Family Foundation was set up by Erszi Ferenczy to preserve the works of the family and educate people about them.

== Gallery ==
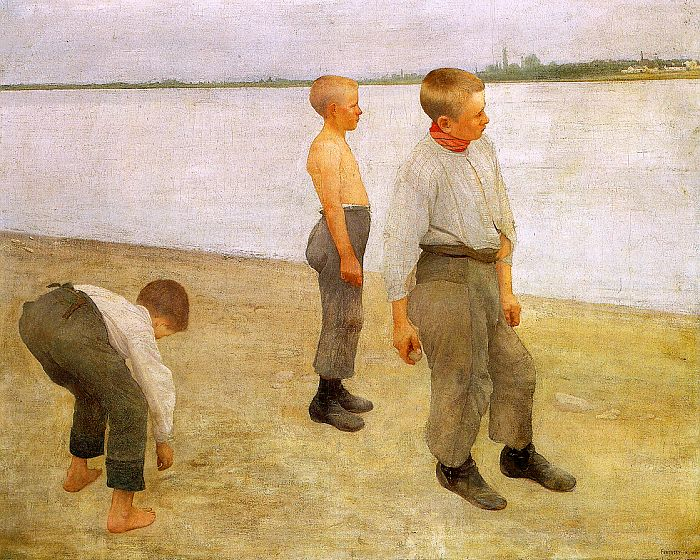
Boys Throwing Pebbles into the River (1890)

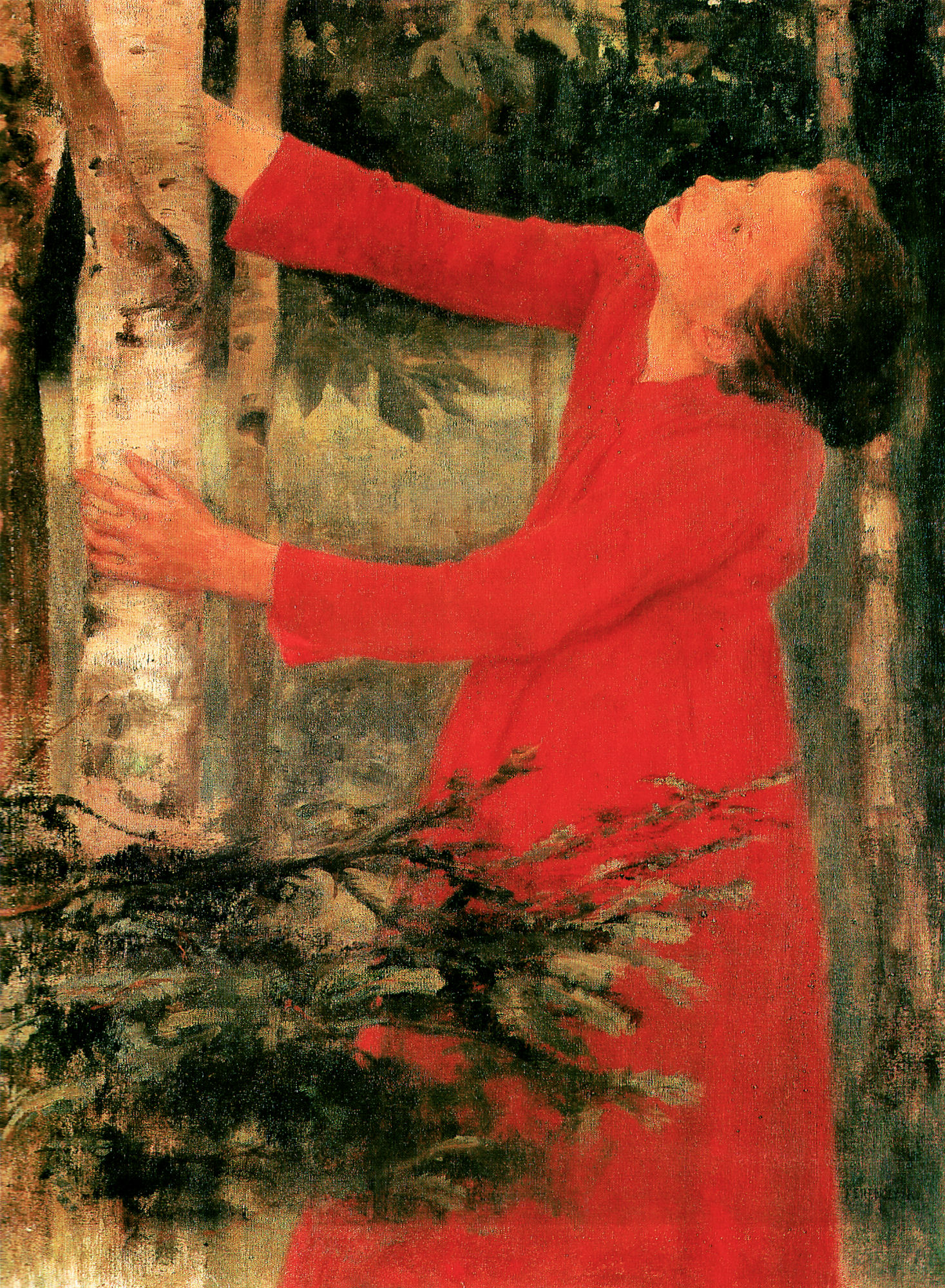
Birdsong (1893)

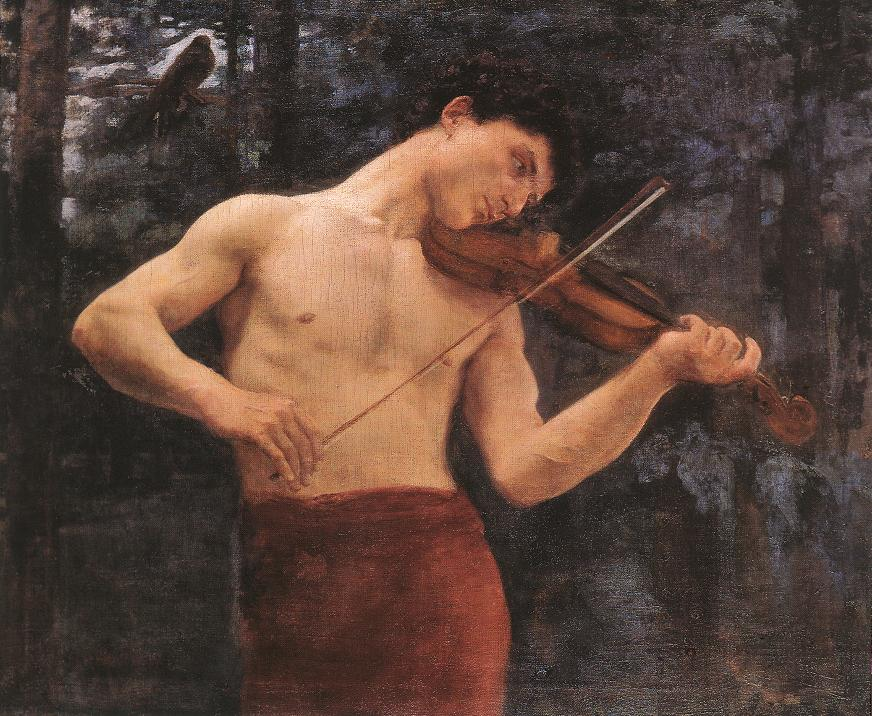
Orpheus (1894)

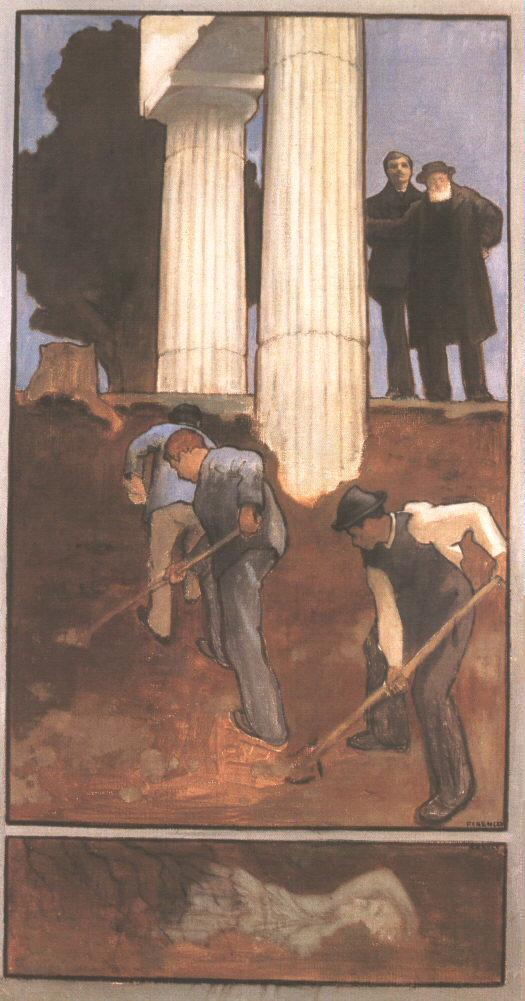
Archaeology (1896)

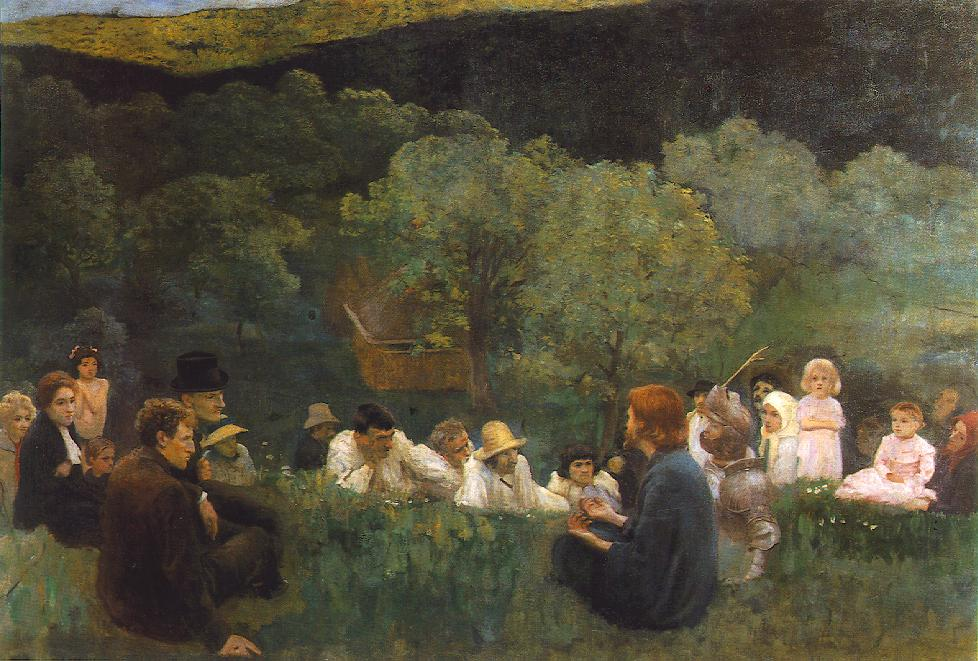
The Sermon on the Mount (1896)

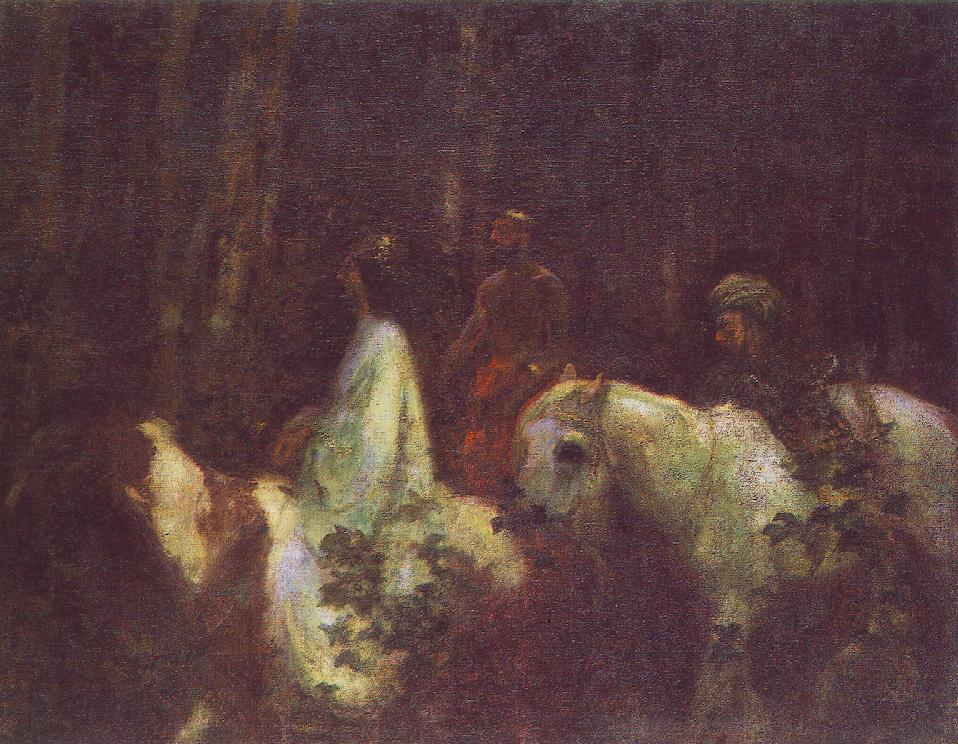
The Three Magi (1898)

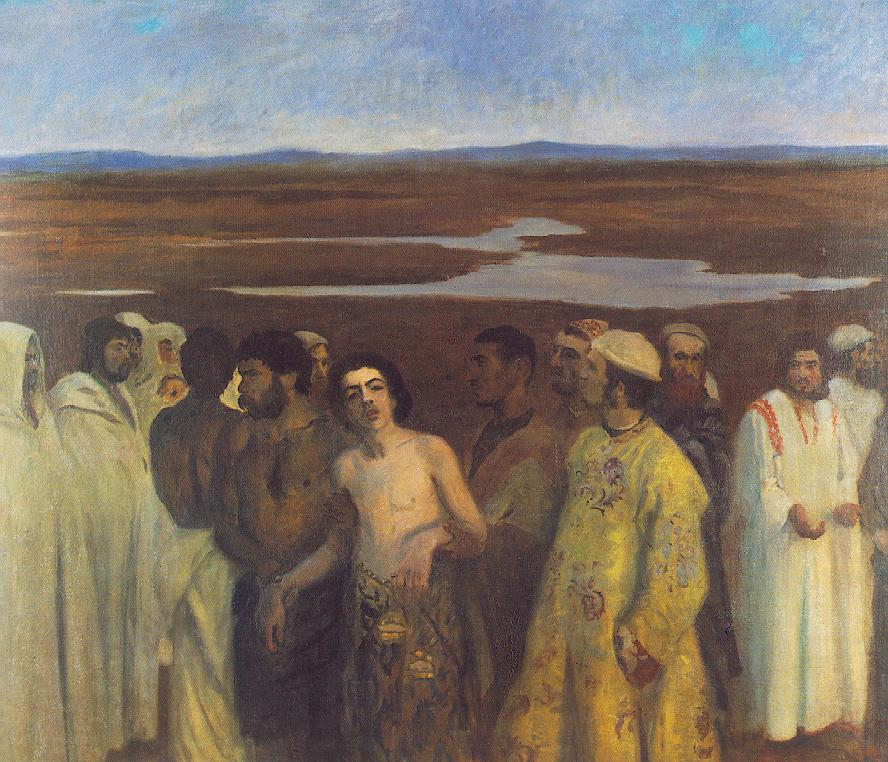
Joseph Sold into Slavery by His Brothers (1900)

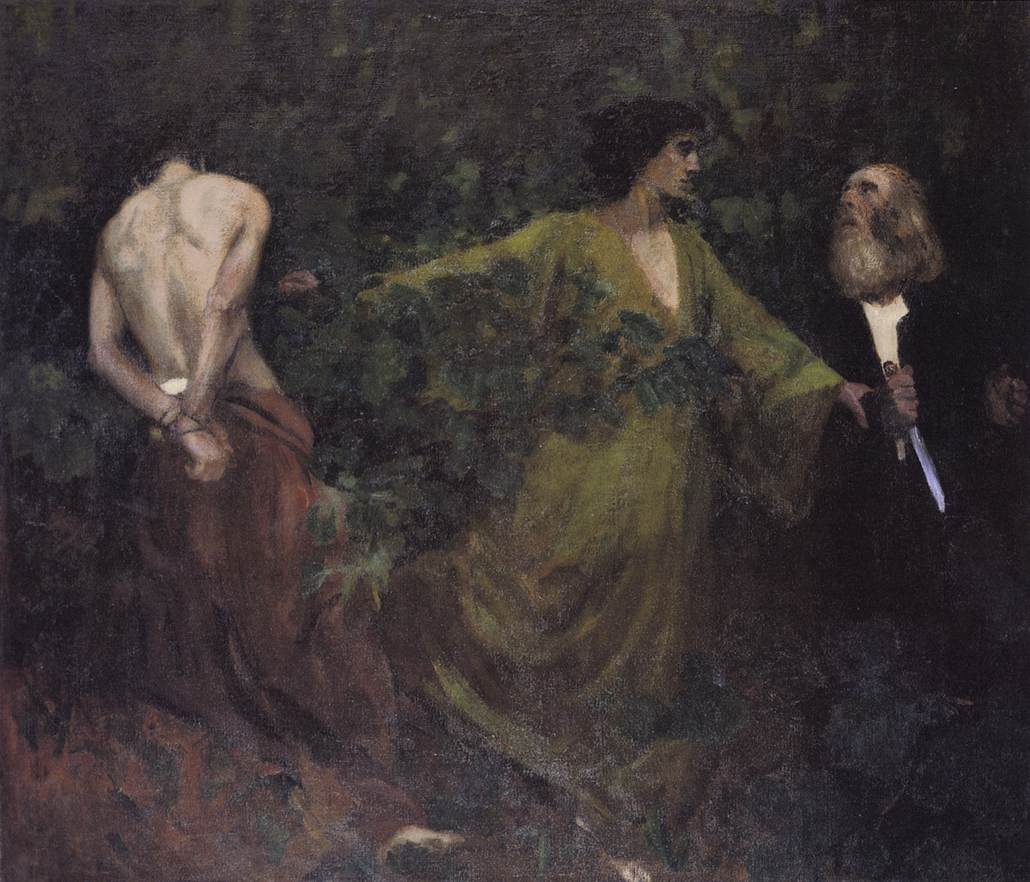
Abraham's Sacrifice (1901)

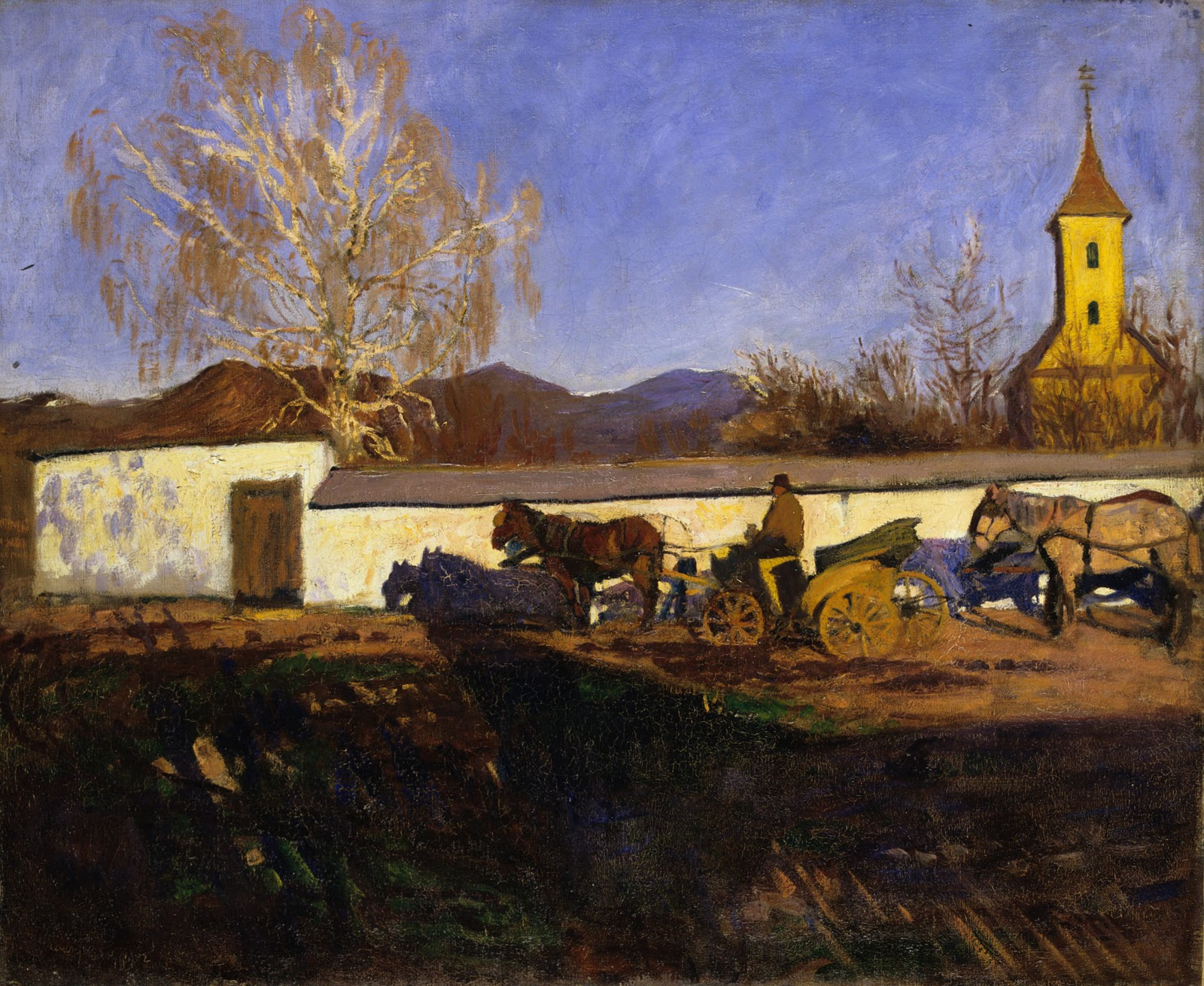
Evening in March (1902)

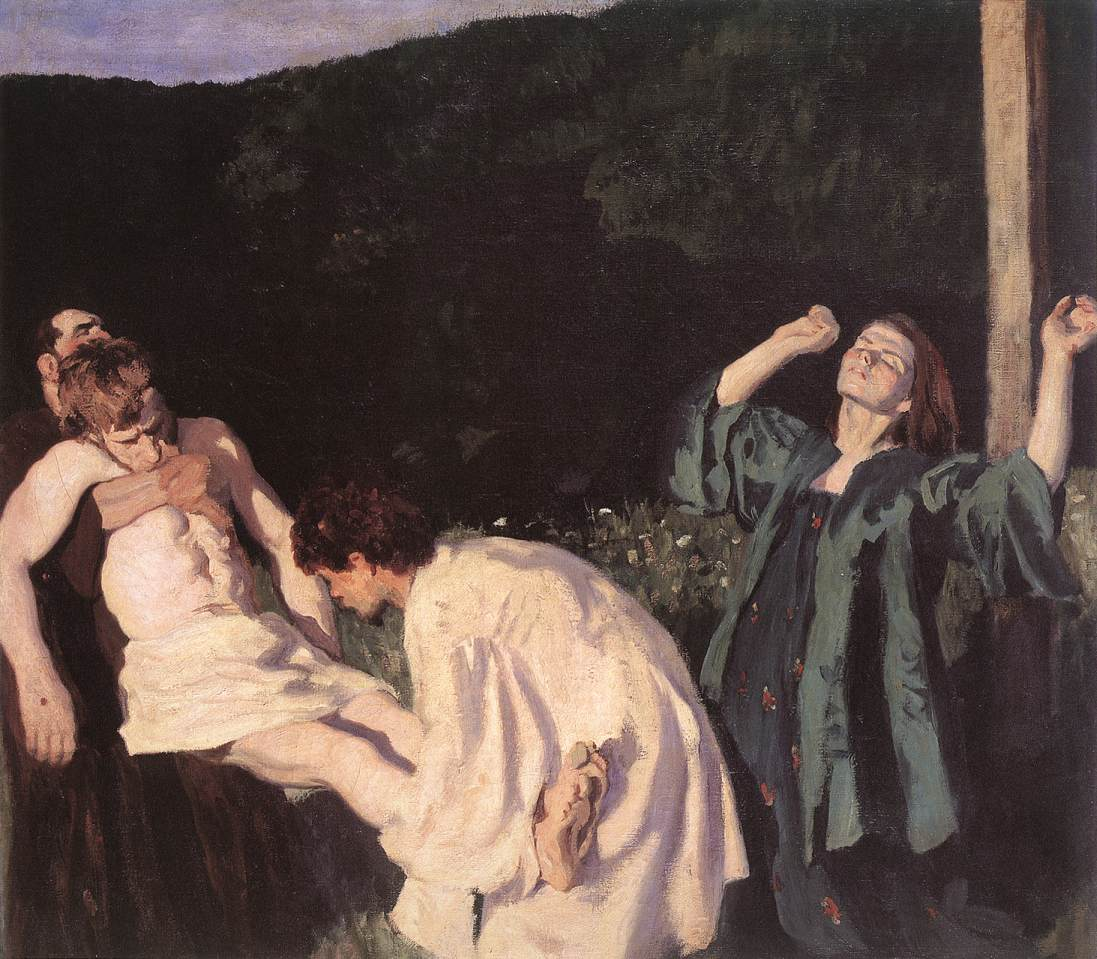
Deposition from the Cross (1903)

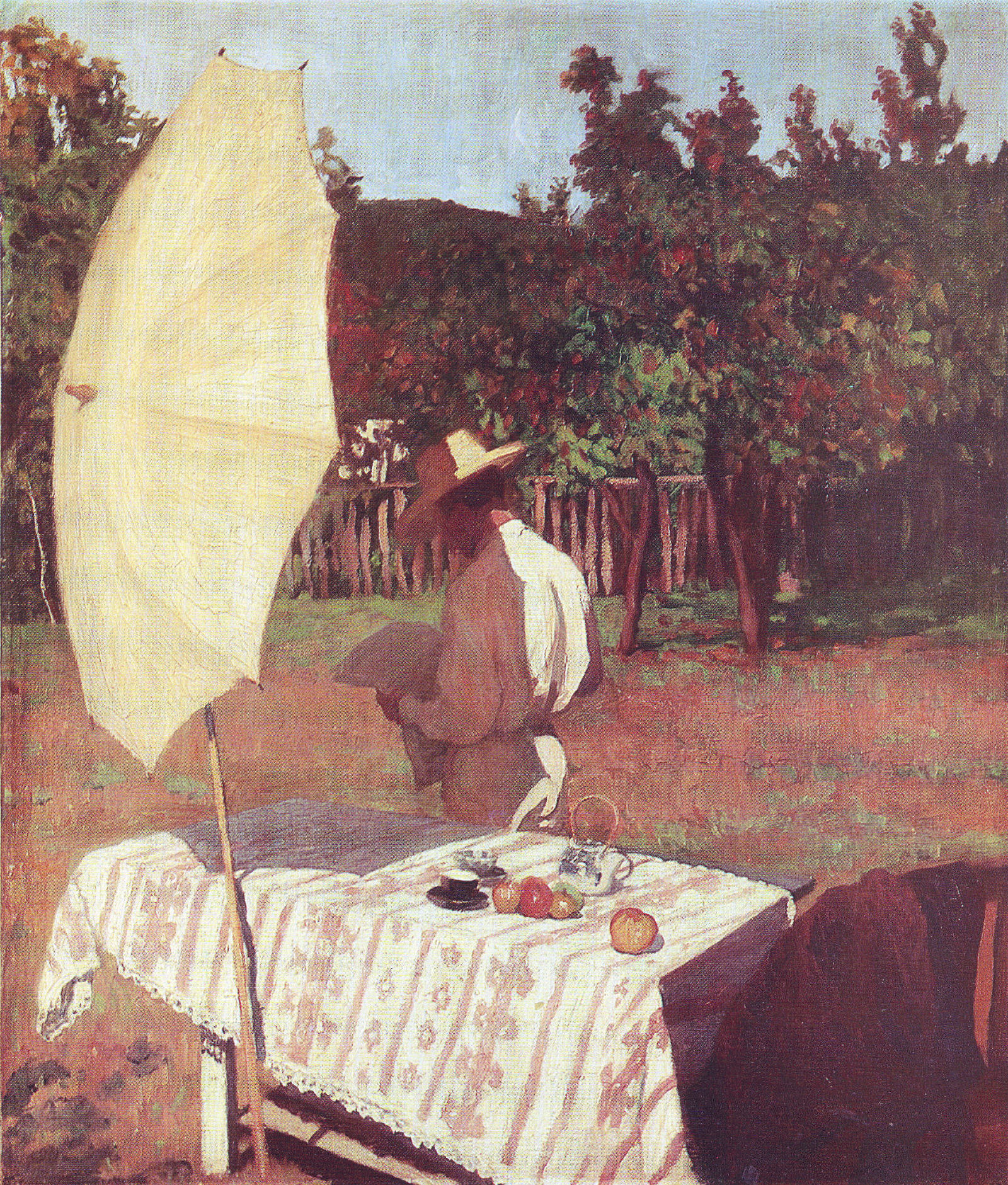
October (1903)

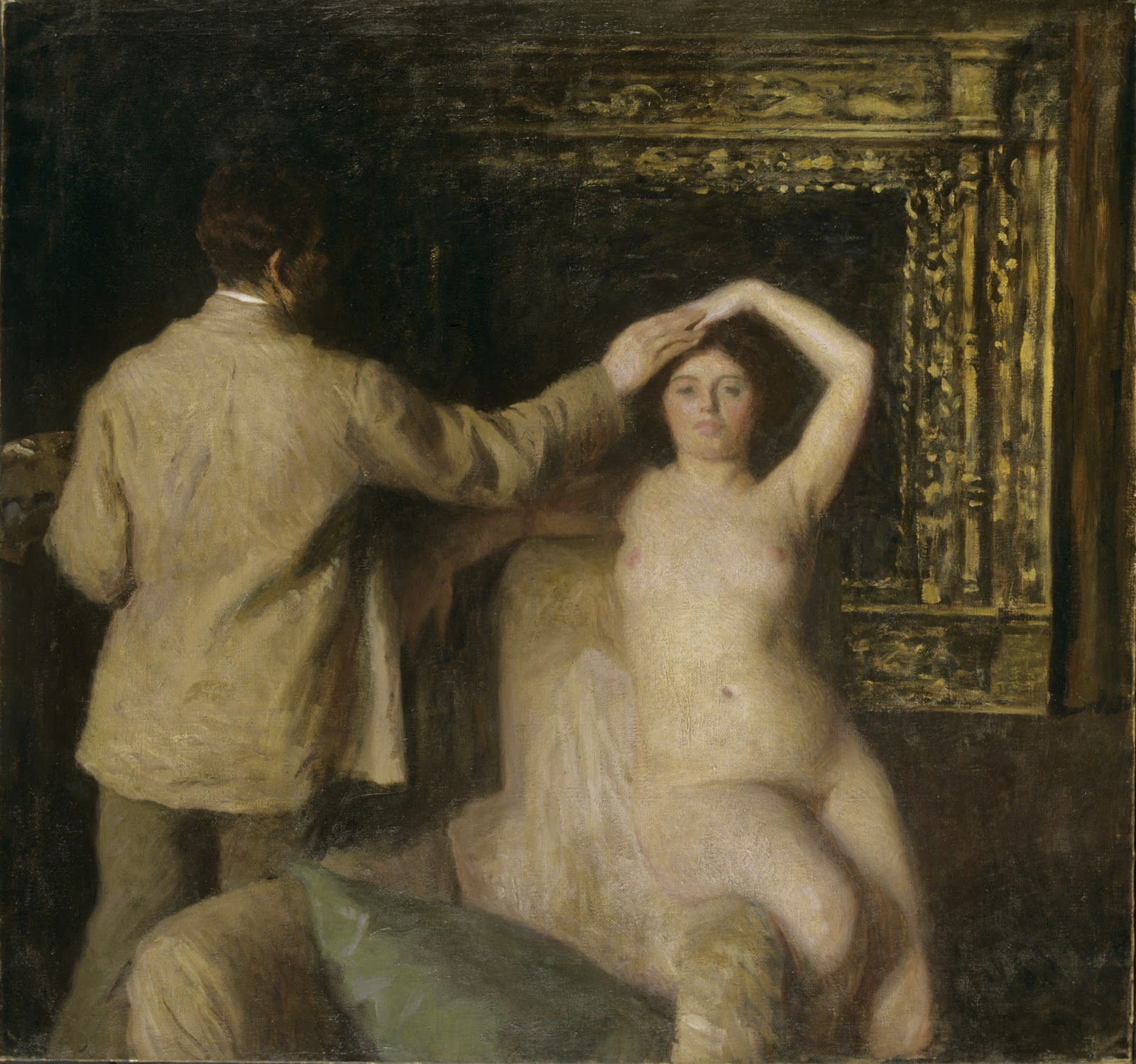
Painter and Model (1904)

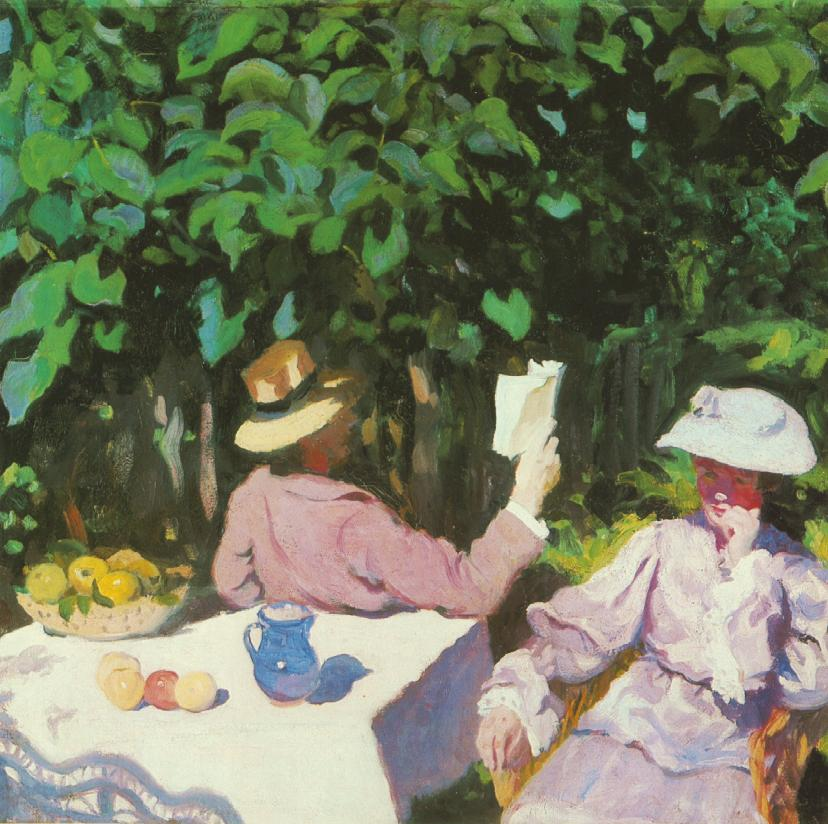
Morning Sunshine (1905)

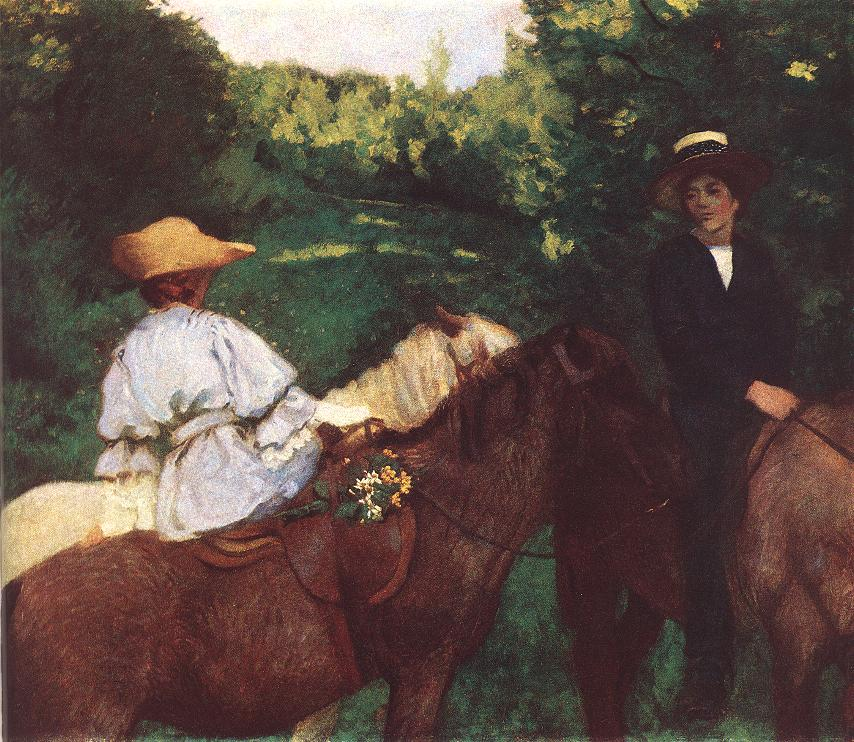
Riding Children (1905)

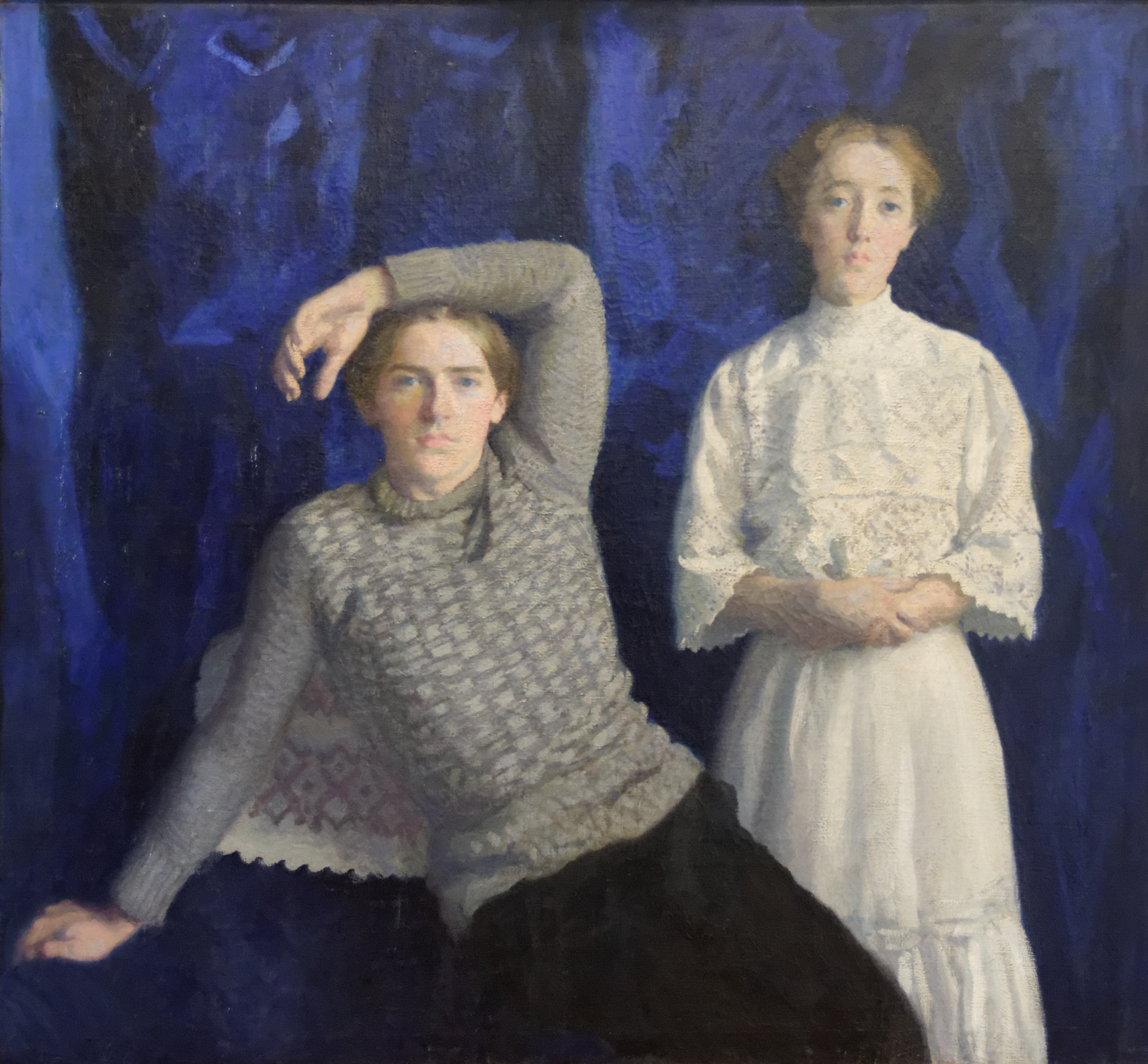
Béni and Noémi (1908)

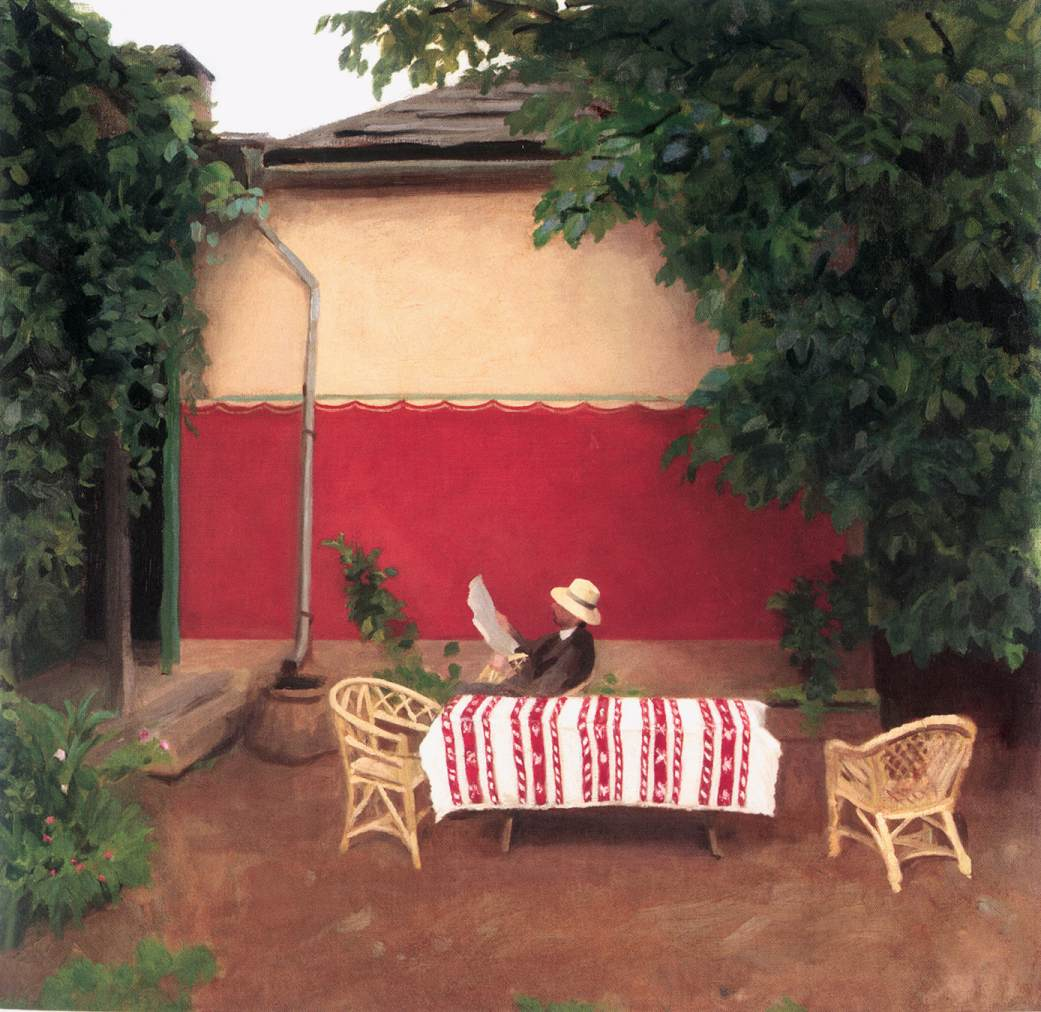
Red Wall (1910)
