= Simon Hollósy =

Hungarian painter

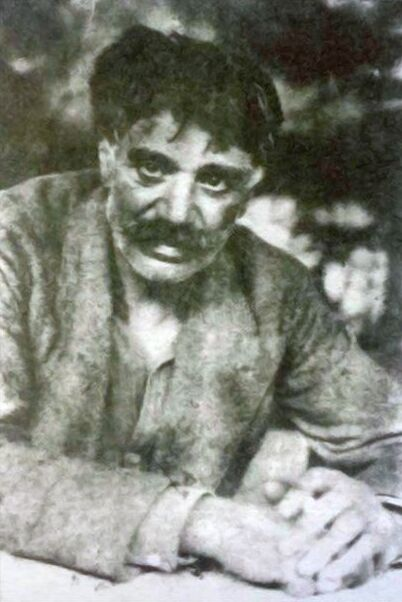
- Born: Simon Hollósy; 2 February 1857
- Died: 8 May 1918 (aged 61)

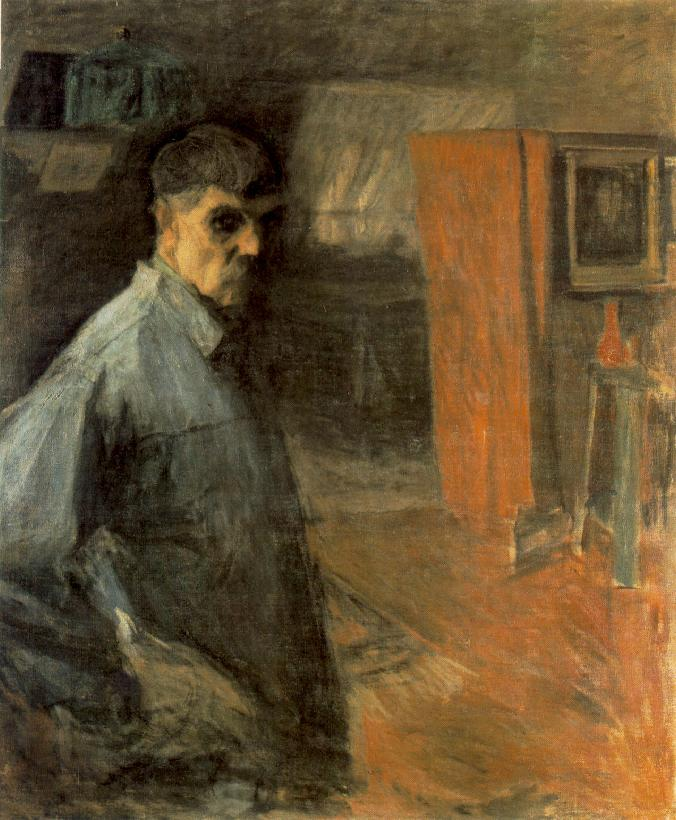
Self-portrait, 1916

Simon Hollósy (2 February 1857 – 8 May 1918) was a Hungarian painter. He was considered one of the greatest Hungarian representatives of 19th-century Naturalism and Realism.

Hollósy was not highly productive as an artist and was more important as an influential teacher, who influenced the painters of the Nagybánya artists' colony. Together, they were significant in late nineteenth and early twentieth-century Hungarian art. In 1966 the Hungarian National Gallery had a major exhibition of the colony's work: The Art of Nagybánya. Centennial Exhibition in Celebration of the Artists' Colony in Nagybánya.

== Early life and education ==
Simon Hollósy was born in 1857 in Máramarossziget, Hungary (today Sighetu Marmaţiei, Romania), in the historic region of Maramureș. His parents were Armenians who had migrated to the area. He early expressed a talent and interest in art.

As a young man, he went to Munich to study, as did many artists from Hungary because there was no academy of fine arts there. Hollósy criticized the training at the Munich Academy, which was strongly based on copying classical models. He founded a private school where he gave free classes, attracting young talents who were interested in realistic portrayal. He opened the way to new styles by relying on his personality and by pointing out the merits of French painters, such as Gustave Courbet, who exhibited in the city. He abandoned the academic style in order to follow new trends in French painting, including Impressionism. He also "admired Jules Breton, Jules Bastien-Lepage and read Zola, Murger, Tolstoy and Dostoevsky".

He was more important as a teacher than a painter. His large-scale plan of Rákóczi March, never progressed much beyond sketches, as he kept changing his mind. His landscapes painted in Técső include Landscape in Técső, Landscape with Stacks and Sunset with Stacks, in which he applied elements of en plein air and Impressionism. His self-portrait (1916), held by the Hungarian National Gallery, is considered one of his most harrowing pictures.

Encouraged by István Réti and János Thorma, his pupils and friends, Hollósy spent the summer of 1896 in Nagybánya (today Baia Mare, Romania) with his school. That is considered the founding of the Nagybánya artists' colony, of which the painter Károly Ferenczy was another important early member. The more rural location provided many chances for painting outdoors. These artists and their followers played an important role in introducing impressionism and post-impressionism to Hungarian painting.

Hollósy soon settled down in Nagybánya. With its naturalistic style and emphasis on plein air techniques, his school determined much of Hungarian painting for decades.

Hollósy left the Nagybánya colony in 1901. The following year, he began to spend the summers in Técső (today Tiachiv, Ukraine, in the historic Maramureș region) with those students who followed him. During the winters, Hollósy returned to Munich to run his school there.

== Legacy and honours ==
- In 1966 the Hungarian National Gallery had a major exhibition of the colony's work: The Art of Nagybánya. Centennial Exhibition in Celebration of the Artists' Colony in Nagybánya.
- A large number of paintings by Simon Hollosy are in the Hungarian National Gallery.

== Exhibits ==
- 2009, "Munich in Hungarian, Hungarian Artists in Munich 1850–1914, 2 Oct. 2009 – Jan. 2010", Hungarian National Gallery.
- 1991–1992, Standing in the Storm: The Hungarian Avant-Garde from 1908–1930, Santa Barbara Museum of Art, Santa Barbara, California.

== See also ==
- Károly Ferenczy
- István Réti
- János Thorma

== Selected paintings ==
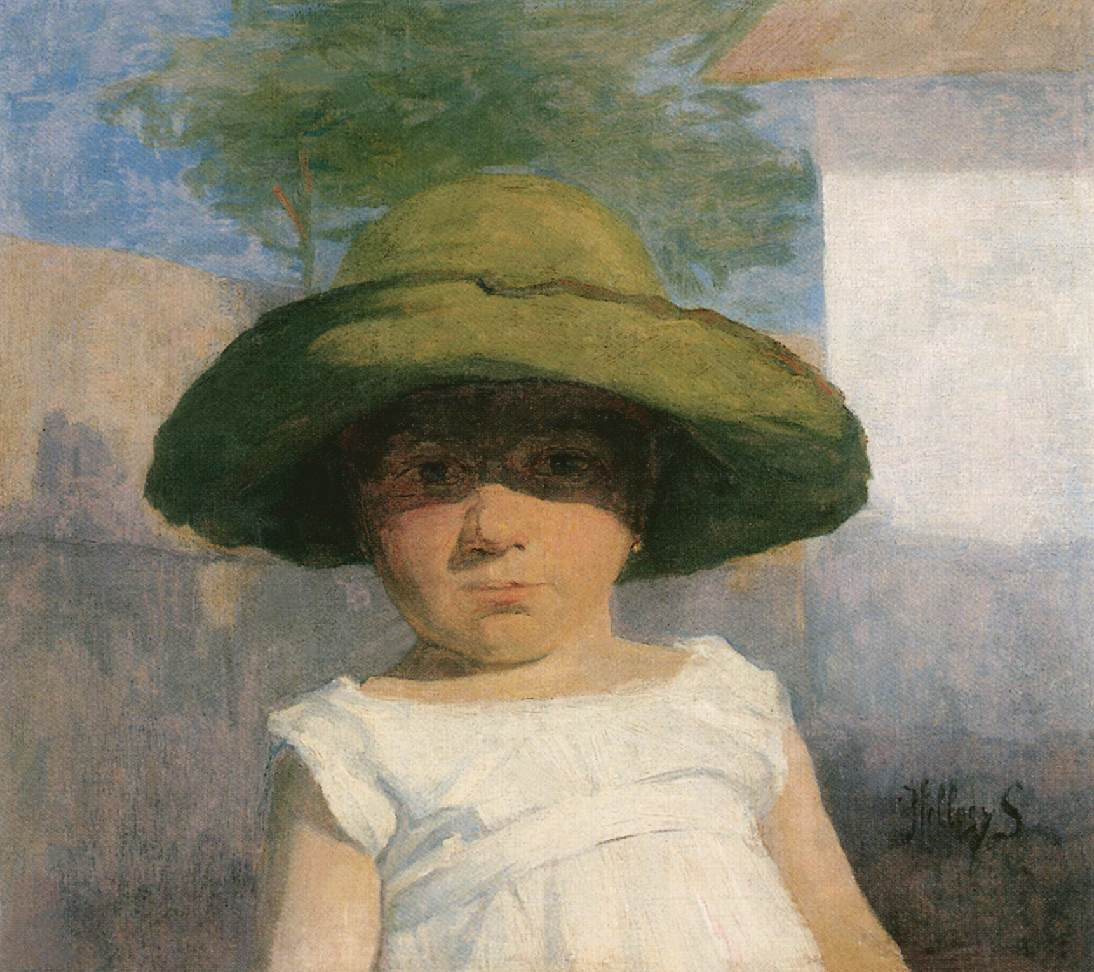
Girl with a Large Green Hat, ca. 1900

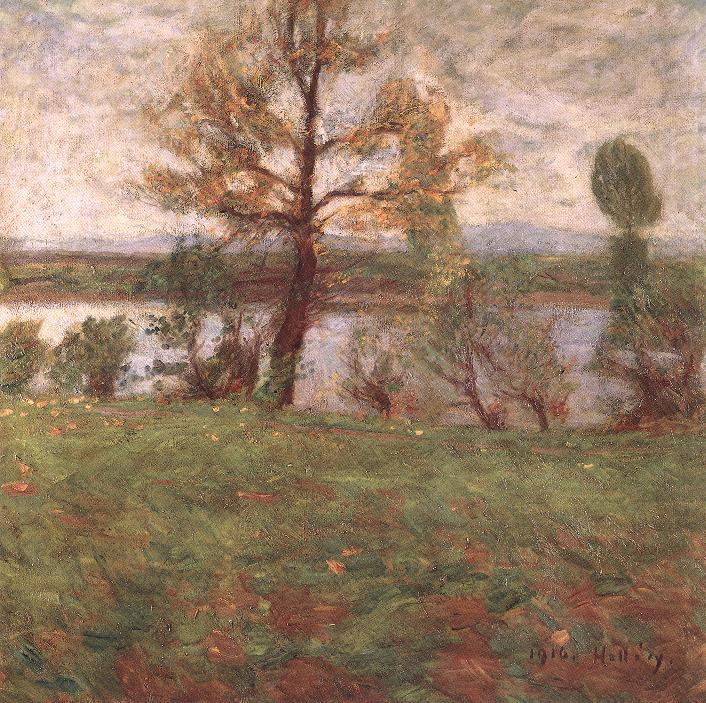
Springtime Mood (Banks of the Tisza River), 1912

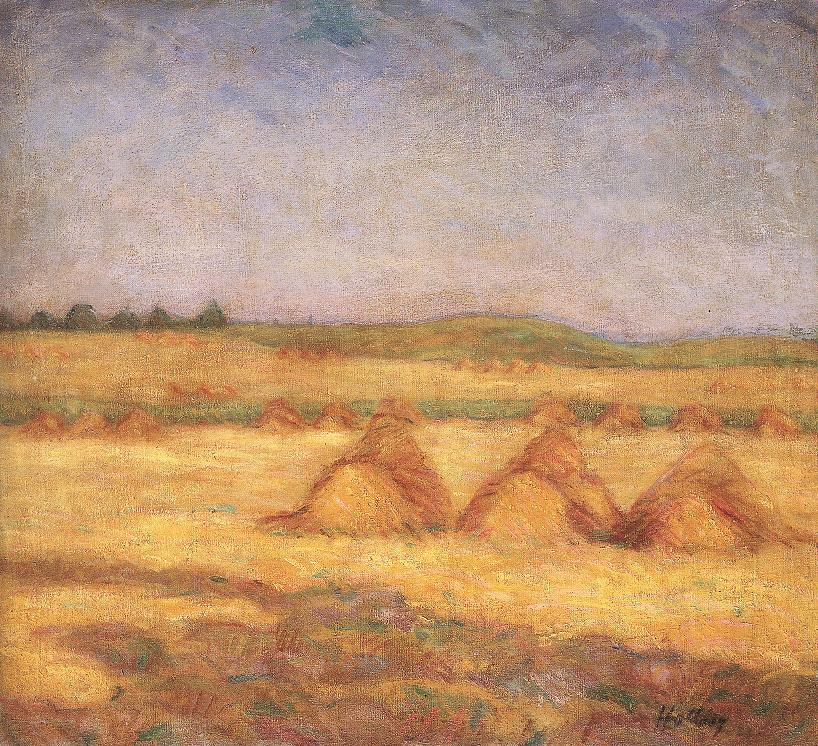
After the Harvest, 1908

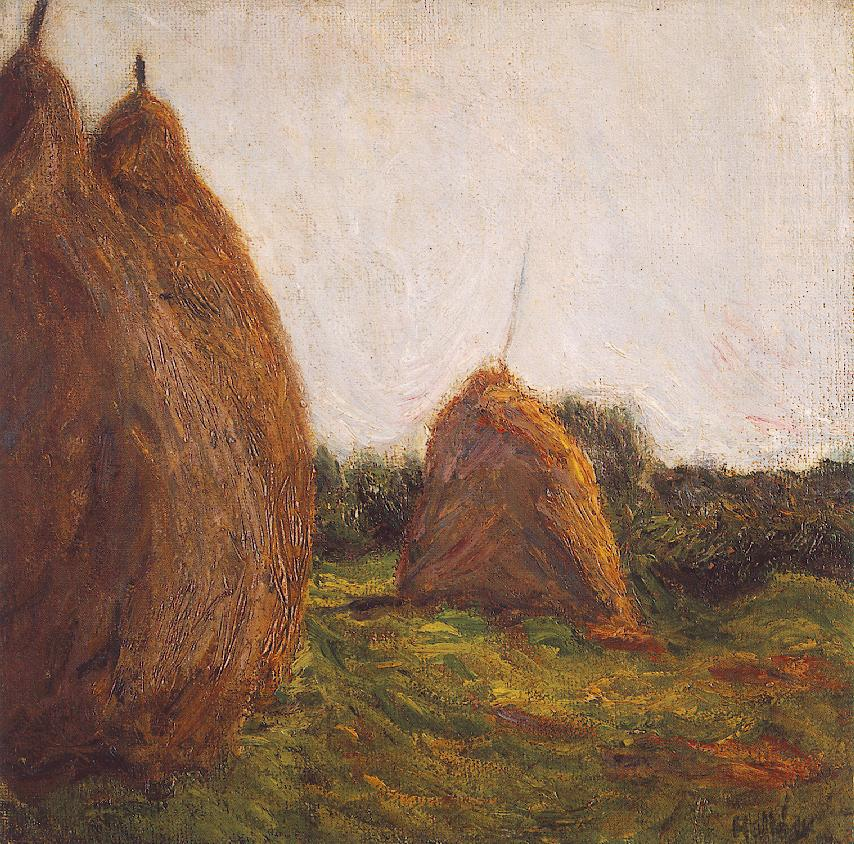
Haystacks II, 1912

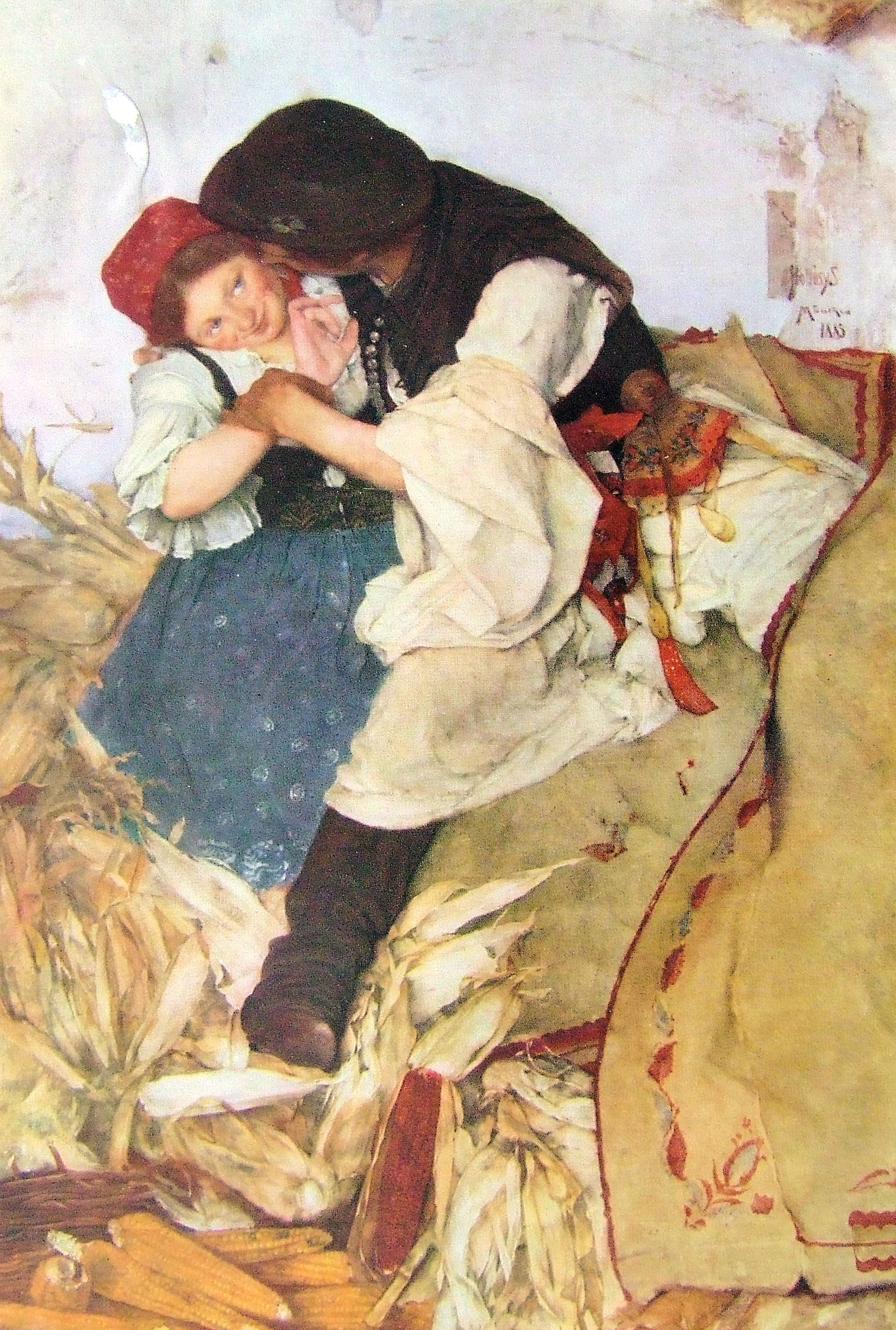
Corn Husking, 1885

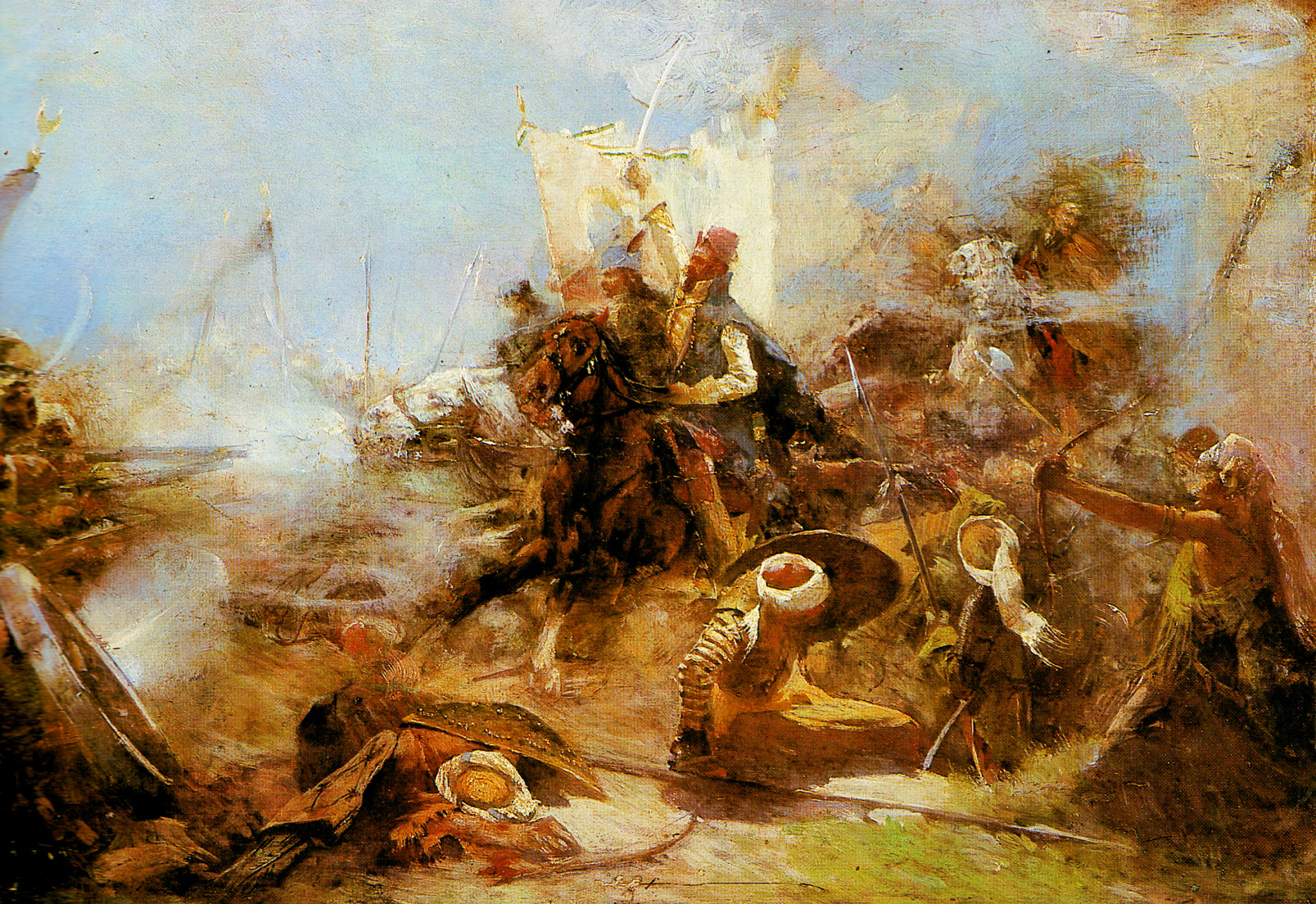
Zrínyi's Charge on the Turks, 1896
