= Hungarian Open =

Hungarian Open may refer to:

- Hungarian Open (darts)
- Hungarian Open (table tennis)
- Hungarian Open (tennis), an ATP World Tour event
- Hungarian Challenger Open, an ATP Challenger Tour event
- Hungarian Ladies Open, a WTA Tour event
- Hungarian Open, a tournament in the European Poker Tour

== See also ==
- Hungarian Opening, an opening in Chess
- Hungarian Open Air Museum
