= Szentendre =

Town in Pest, Hungary

- Town
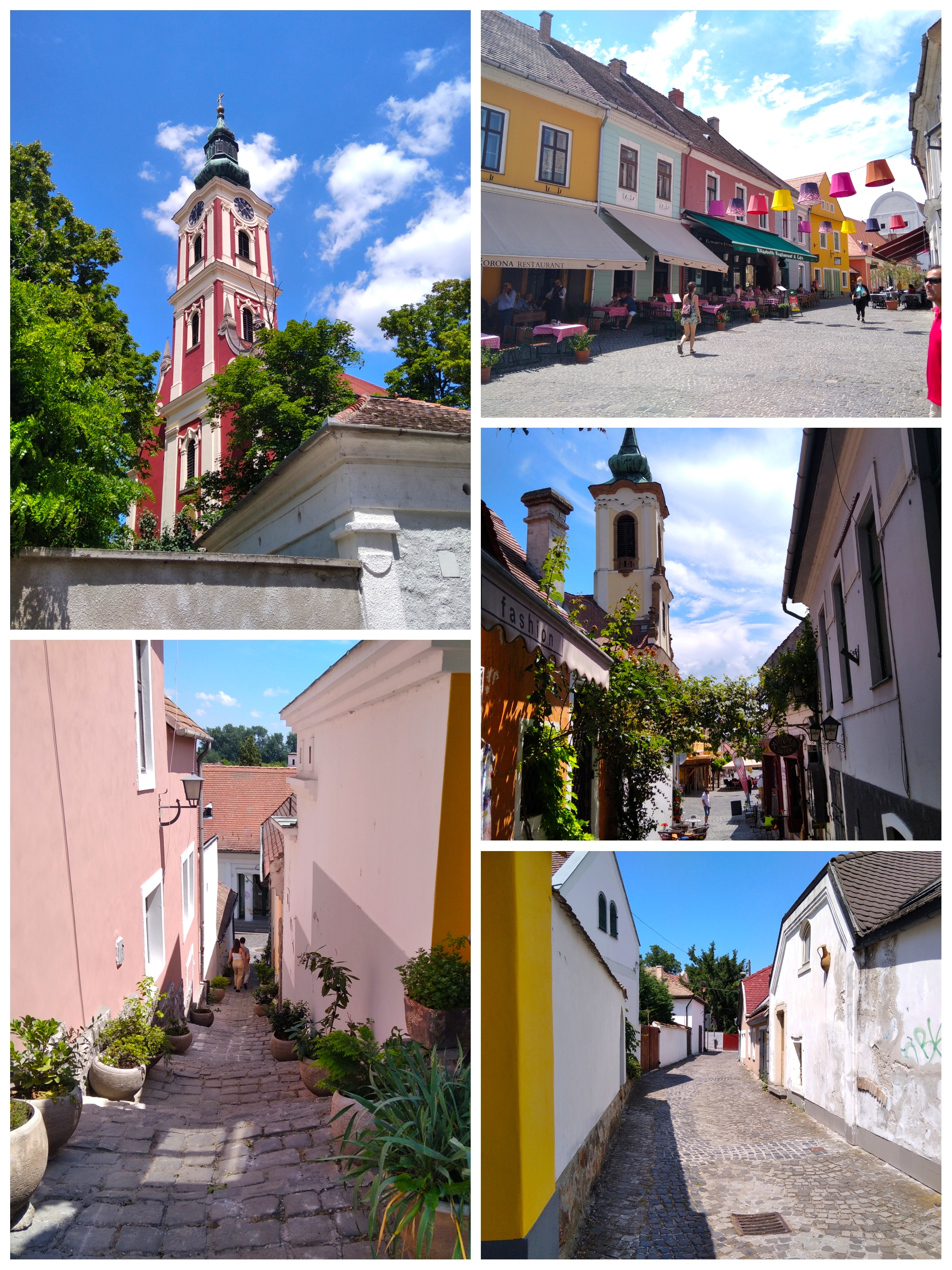

- Flag Coat of arms

- Location of Szentendre in Hungary Location of Szentendre in Pest county
- Coordinates: 47.70440°N 19.06858°E
- Country: Hungary
- County: Pest
- District: Szentendre

Area
  - Total: 43.83 km^{2} (16.92 sq mi)

Population (2021)
  - Total: 27,534
  - Density: 592/km^{2} (1,530/sq mi)
- Time zone: UTC+1 (CET)
  - Summer (DST): UTC+2 (CEST)
- Postal code: 2000, 2001
- Area code: (+36) 26
- Website: szentendre.hu

Szentendre, also known as Saint Andrew, is a riverside town in Pest County, Hungary, between the capital city Budapest and Pilis-Visegrád Mountains. The town is known for its museums (most notably the Hungarian Open-air Museum), galleries, and artists.

Due to its historic architecture along with easy accessibility via rail and river, it has become a destination for tourists staying in Budapest. There are many facilities, including souvenir shops and restaurants, catering to these visitors.

== Name ==
The name of the town is ultimately based on the Medieval Latin form Sankt Andrae ("St. Andrew"). Because of the diverse mix of nationalities to have once settled in Szentendre, the settlement has a variety of names according to language. The Hungarian name for the town is Szentendre; the Croatian name is Senandrija; the German name is Sankt Andrä; in Serbian, the name is Sentandreja (Serbian Cyrillic: Сентандреја); the Slovak name is Svätý Ondrej. Its name (Sanctus Andreas) first appeared in a student's will in 1146, which was confirmed by King Géza II. The 12th-century city centre was situated around the still existing St. Andrew's Church on the other side of the Bükkös Brook.

== History ==
The area where Szentendre is today was uninhabited when the Magyars arrived. In the 9th century, Árpád's companion, the sacral prince Kurszán, settled here. He renovated the Roman fortress that had fallen into ruin and reestablished a settlement on the remains of the Roman buildings.

Little is known about the history of Szentendre between the 9th and 10th centuries. Some sources suggest that there was a settlement called Apurig in this area. The word apor means "brook" and so presumably the settlement was located on a small river-way. Based on maps of military surveys, there were five brooks in the area: Dera, Bükkös, Öregvíz and Sztelin. It is unknown as to which brook the Apor can be identified with.

The city was largely depopulated in the Ottoman era. According to a 17th-century census, only one family and their service staff remained here at that time.

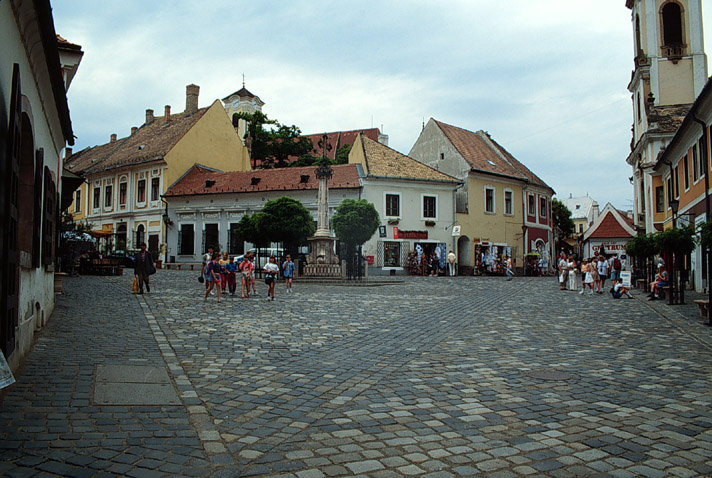
Photo of Szentendre's "Fő tér" (Main Square)

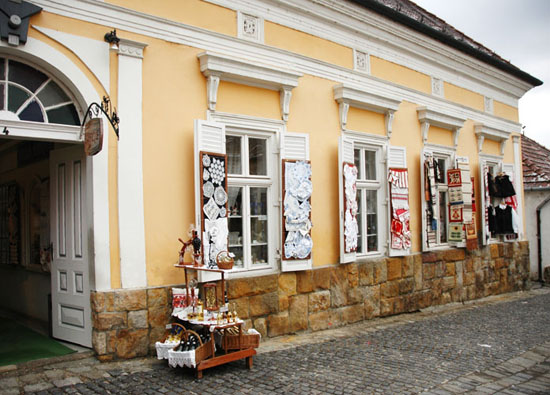
Decorated Shop Windows

After the Ottomans were expelled from the area, foreign settlers moved to the settlement. Today evidence of the town's prosperity in this time can be seen in the baroque style of the houses, the Mediterranean atmosphere of the town's architecture, its churches, the cobblestoned streets, and its narrow alleys. During the Great Turkish War, Serbs were invited to emigrate to Hungary to evade the Ottoman Empire. Because of this invitation, there was a mass emigration of Serbs in 1690 to the Szentendre region. These Serbs left enduring traces on the townscape and its culture. The buildings in the city center have tried to preserve this Serbian influence in their architecture, but these buildings do not in fact date to the 17th century. Based on maps from the end of the century, the city center actually boasted other buildings at that time.

There was also considerable Dalmatian immigration. The Dalmatian families settled on Donkey Mountain where Dalmát Street preserves their memory today. Even in the 1980s, this street was inhabited exclusively by descendants of the original Dalmatians. These descendants now live throughout the city.

Although the Ottomans had decimated the population of the region, starting in the 1690s, the population slowly began to increase and in 1872 it reached a level when the town-like character began to dominate again instead of the village-like character. The public administration as well as the business establishments made it possible to practice all the privileges entailing a city. Szentendre was granted city-status in 1872. In 1888 the railway between Szentendre and Budapest was opened.

The calm provincial life of the city has attracted artists since the beginning of the 20th century. The Szentendre Artists' Colony came into existence in 1929. The so-called Szentendre School is connected with it. Today, more than two hundred fine and applied artists, authors, poets, musicians and actors live in the city.

The city was a small town until the 1970s; its population hardly attained four thousand. The city at that time included only two parts: the downtown and Donkey Mountain, the latter of which became a living space at the beginning of the twentieth century. These two parts of the town are separated from all the rest of Szentendre's areas by road 11.

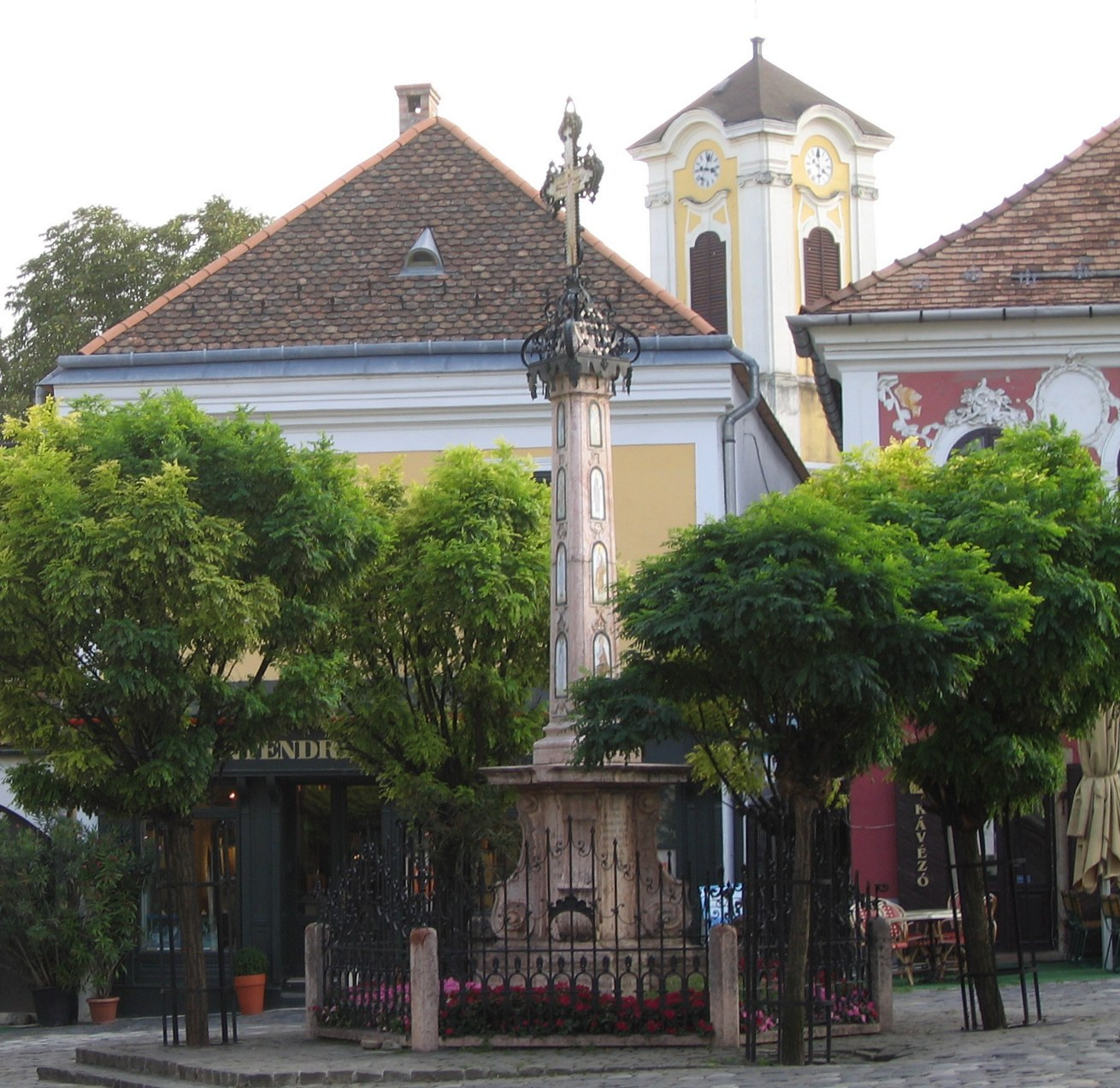
Main Square

Around the historical inner city some smaller settlements joined the town in the course of the centuries, some of which are present day Szentendre's traditional town areas such as Izbég and Derecske. Szentendre also contains green-belt areas such as Pannóniatelep, Püspökmajor, Pismány, Szarvashegy. By the end of the 1970s, due to a large-scale inner-city merger, the populated zone of the town enlarged considerably. By the beginning of the 21st century these areas were completely populated and the earlier small town attained the population of 25,000 in 2010. This expansion of the city practically ended traditional fruit-growing and gardening in Szentendre.

The Hungarian Open Air Museum (Skanzen), founded in 1967, shows the village and urban societies' different layers, including the various groups' interior furnishings and lifestyles from the end of the 18th to the middle of the 20th centuries. This museum includes Europe's longest museum railway line, which was built in 2009.

The museum is visited by tourists from both Hungary and abroad.

The Witcher TV series (Netflix, 2019) used the museum grounds to depict the village that was the original home of the character Yennefer; this location was also used in scenes with the lead character, Ciri, at a time when she was in an area with a windmill.

== Railway ==
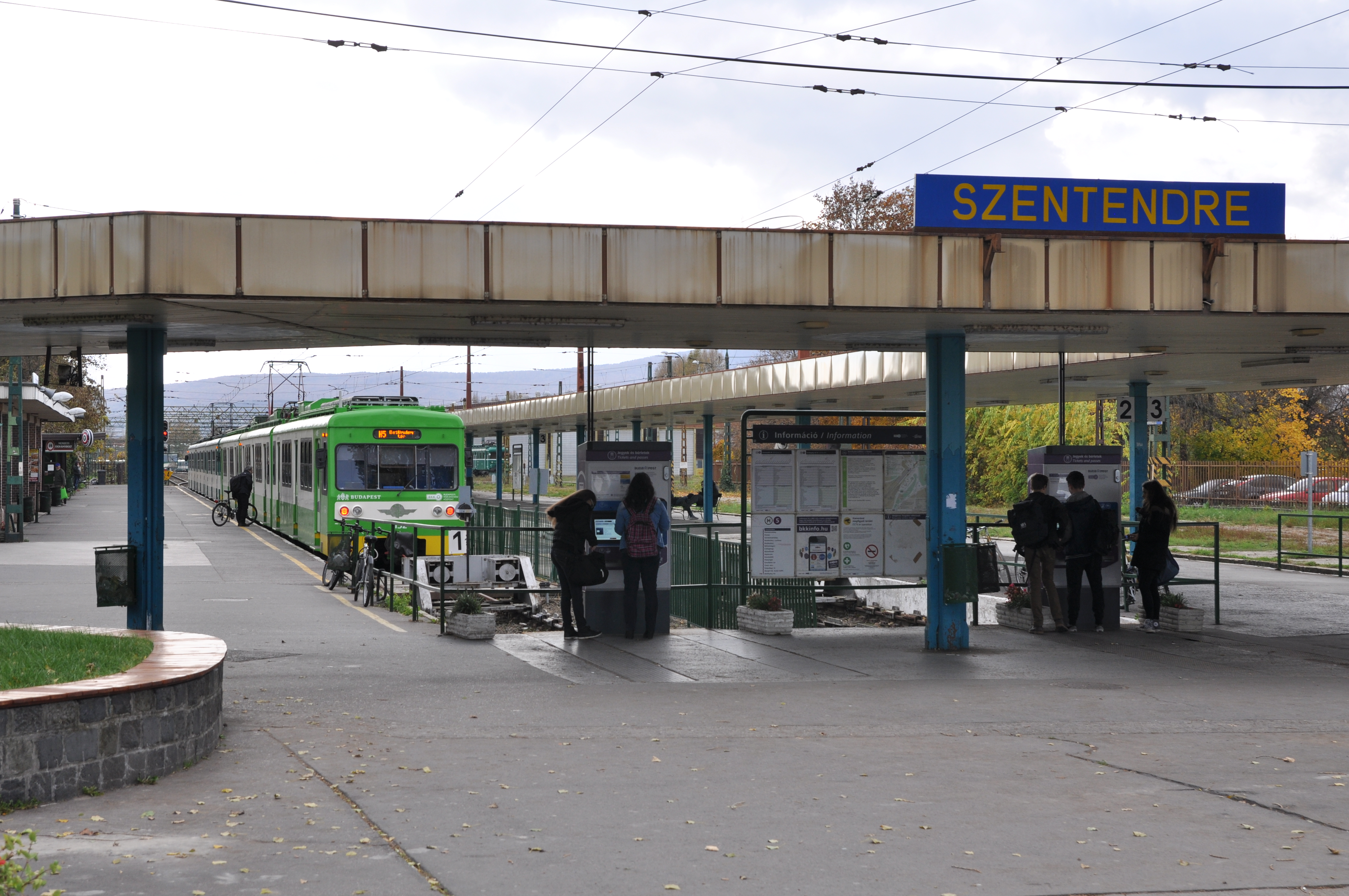
Szentendre railway station in 2016

Szentendre is linked to Budapest by Line 5 of the BHÉV railway, which opened in 1888. This electric railway line operates a frequent train service between Szentendre and Batthyány tér metro station in Budapest via Békásmegyer.

== Arts ==
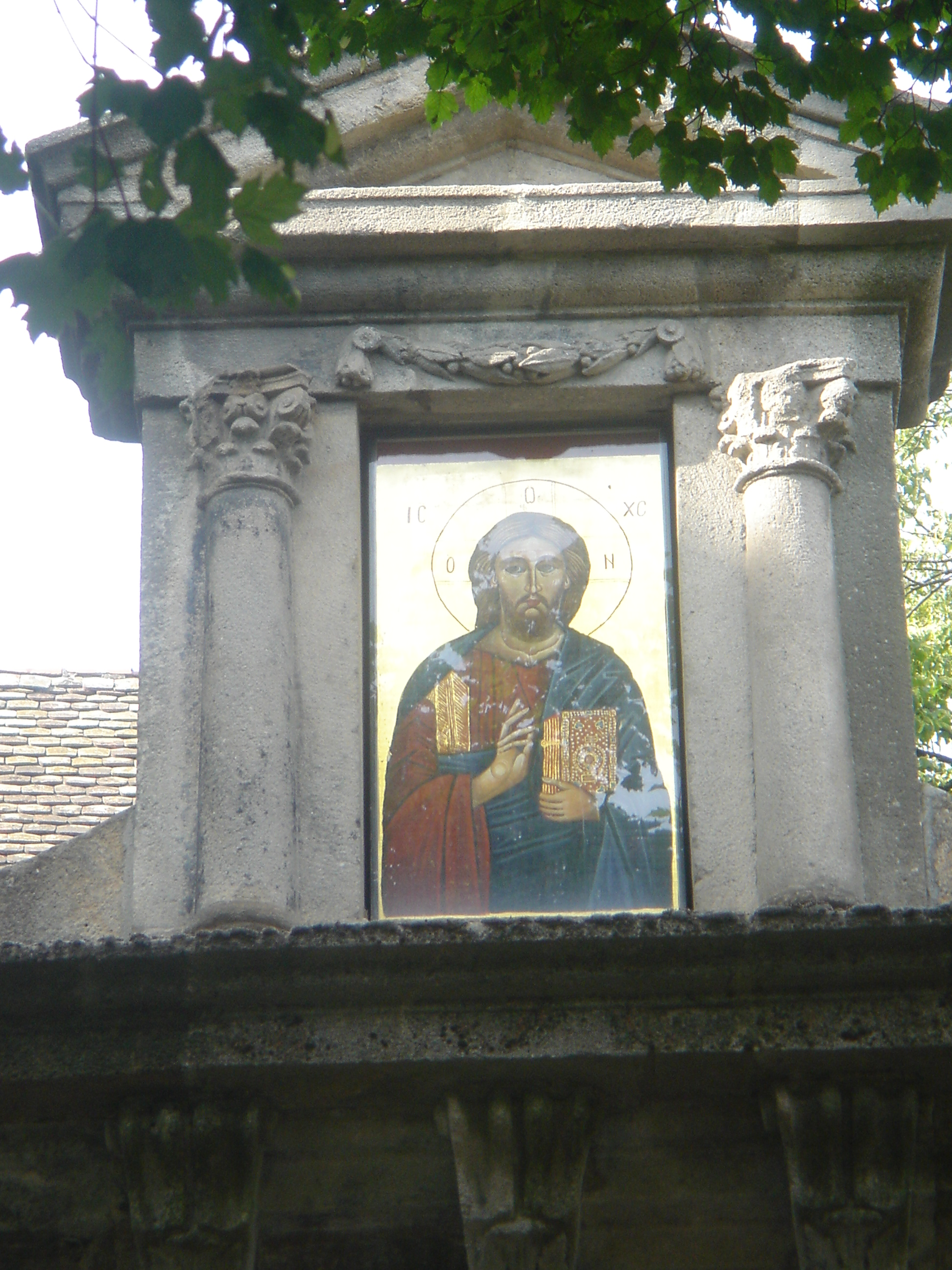
A sunlit icon of Jesus above the gate to a Serbian Orthodox church in Szentendre.

Szentendre has been the home of generations of Hungarian artists since the early 20th century. Szentendre Artists' Colony worked in the northern part of the town.

There are many museums and contemporary galleries representing the rich traditions of the visual art.

List of art museums

- Margit Anna - Imre Ámos Collection
- Jenő Barcsay Collection
- Béla Czóbel Museum
- Károly Ferenczy Museum, devote to the founder of Hungarian modernism and his family
- János Kmetty Museum
- Margit Kovács Ceramic Collection
- Lajos Vajda Museum
- Szentendre Gallery
- Gallery of the Artists' Colony
- ArtMill

List of contemporary galleries

- Aktív Art Gallery
- Gallery Erdész
- Műhely Gallery
- Palmetta Design Gallery
- ArtUnio Gallery
- Vajda Lajos Studio

== Population ==
Historical population
Year	Pop.	±%
1870	4,683	—
1880	4,229	−9.7%
1890	4,260	+0.7%
1900	4,822	+13.2%
1910	5,673	+17.6%
1920	5,877	+3.6%
1930	7,210	+22.7%
1941	9,651	+33.9%
1949	9,283	−3.8%
1960	10,466	+12.7%
1970	13,008	+24.3%
1980	16,901	+29.9%
1990	19,351	+14.5%
2001	22,747	+17.5%
2011	25,963	+14.1%

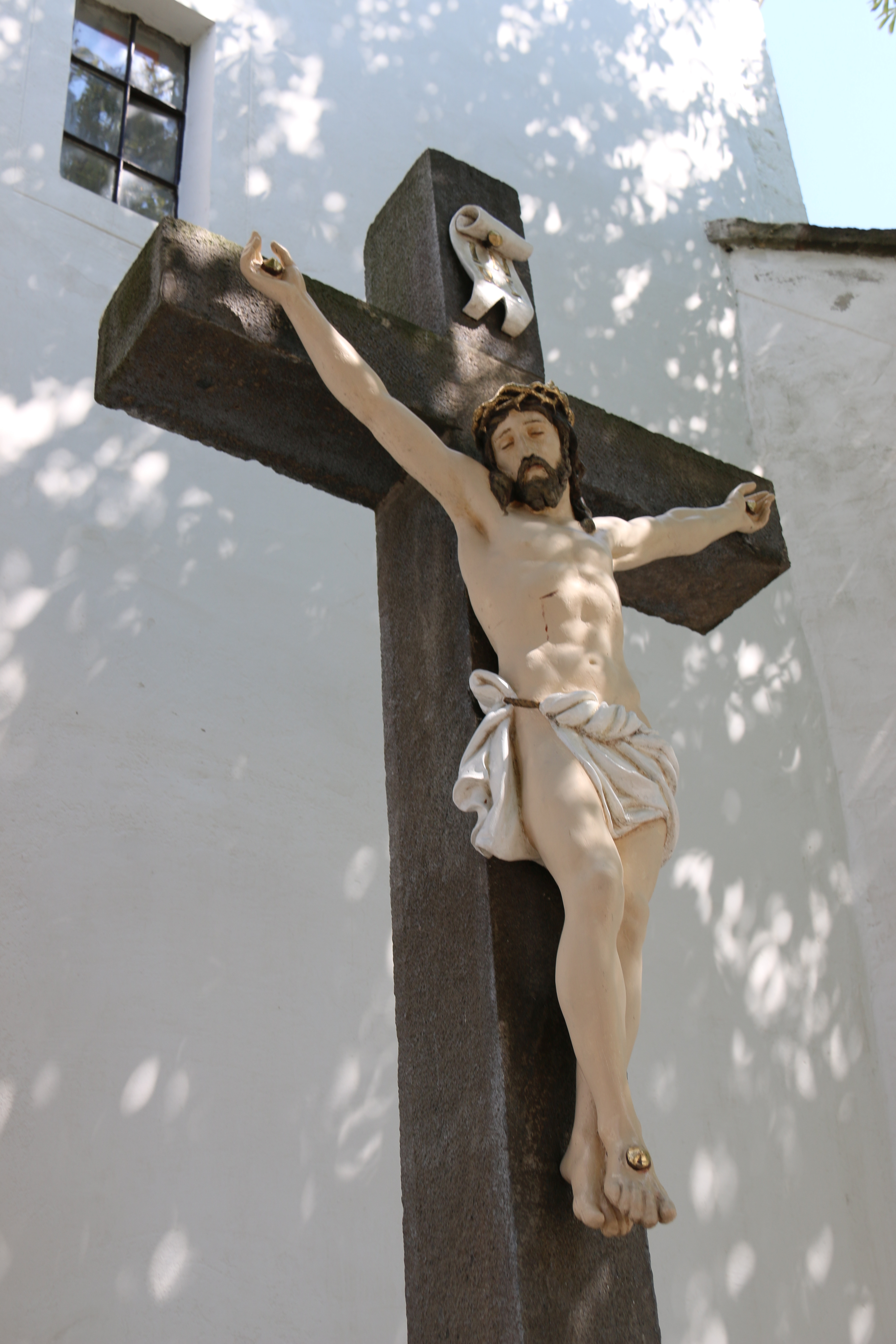
Crucifix near St. John the Baptist Parish Church, in Szentendre

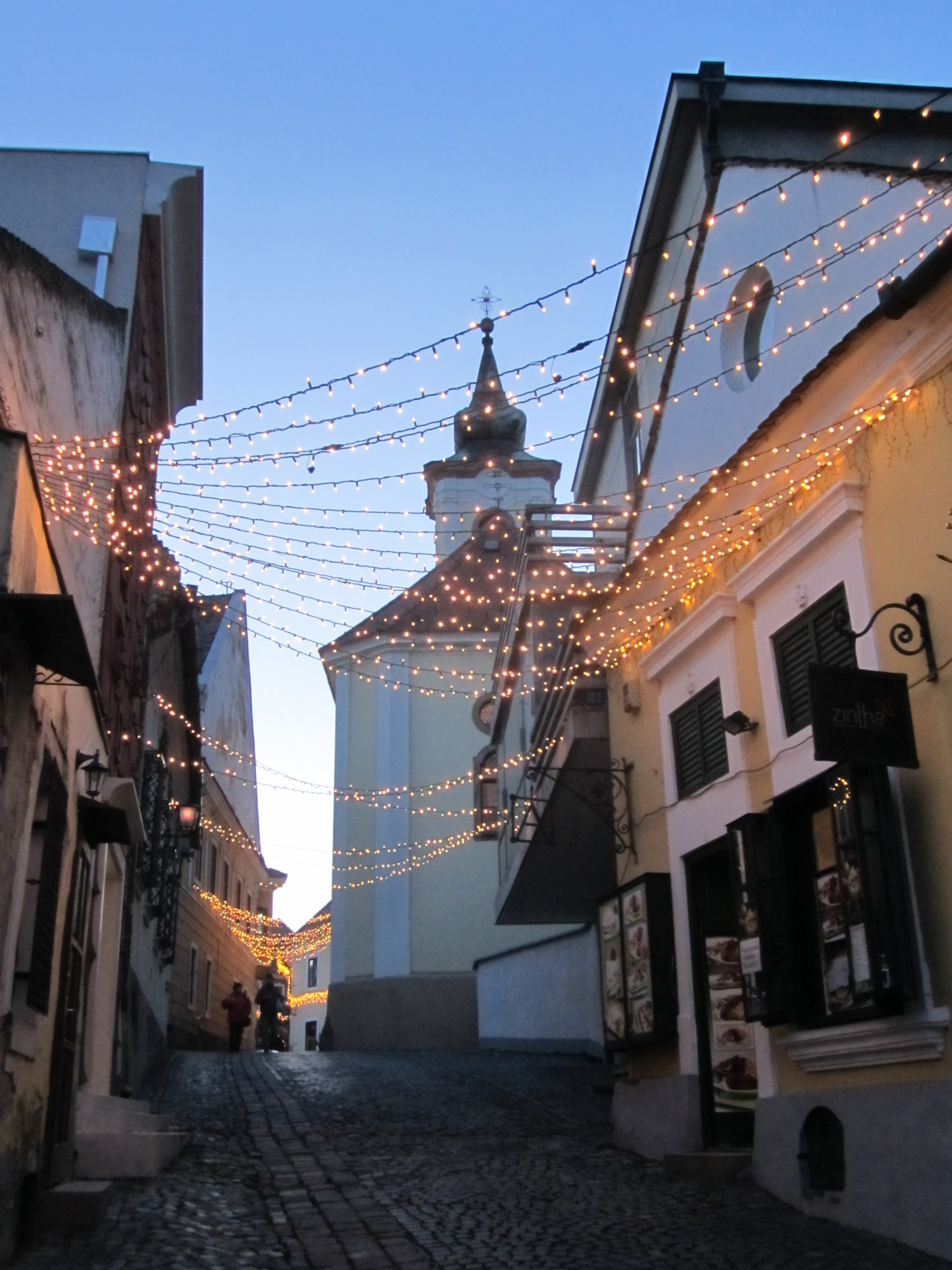
Town centre in January

In the 18th century Szentendre had Serb majority, but in the 19th century they dropped to minority due to one-child family model, ethnic Germans followed the declining Serb community. By the late 19th century rapidly growing Hungarians became the dominant ethnic group, assimilated Germans and the remaining Serbs too. In 2001, Szentendre had 22,747 inhabitants, of whom there were 21,001 ethnic Hungarians, 225 Germans, and only 100 Serbs.

Religions

- Roman Catholic - 49.3%
- Calvinist - 13.5%
- Lutheran - 2%
- Greek Catholic - 1.4%
- Others (Christian) - 1.2%
- Others (non-Christian) - 0.3%
- Unaffiliated - 16.9%
- No answer, unknown - 15.4%

Nationalities

- Magyars - 92.3%
- Germans - 1%
- Slovaks - 0.6%
- Romani - 0.5%
- Serbs - 0.4%
- Others - 1%
- No answer, unknown - 4.2%

Today there are active Serbian, Croat, German, and Polish municipal minority self-governments in Szentendre.

== Notable people ==
- Béla Apáti Abkarovics was a Hungarian painter of Serbian roots, lived and worked in Szentendre
- Jovan Avakumović, born in 1748 in Szentendre during the Enlightenment, producing works in verse in Serbian vernacular
- Jakov Ignjatović, Serbian 19th-century novelist and prose writer
- István Regős, Hungarian painter and artist
- Gavril Stefanović Venclović, early 18th century Serbian poet and painter of church icons
- Kati Wolf, Hungary's contestant for Eurovision 2011.
- Báthory Zoltán, guitarist for Five Finger Death Punch.
- Vikentije Jovanović

== Twin towns – sister cities ==
Szentendre is twinned with:

- Barbizon, France
- Godmanchester, England, United Kingdom
- Hội An, Vietnam
- Huntingdon, England, United Kingdom
- Kruševac, Serbia
- Salon-de-Provence, France
- Stari Grad, Croatia
- Târgu Secuiesc, Romania
- Uusikaupunki, Finland
- Wertheim, Germany
- Zalău, Romania
- Koprivshtitsa, Bulgaria

== Sport ==
The town's only association football club was Szentendrei Honvéd SE, also known as Honvéd Kossuth Lajos Főiskolai SE. The club's best results were achieved in the 1970s and 1980s, when the club played in the second division. The club even won the 1972–73 season of the Nemzeti Bajnokság III.

== Gallery ==
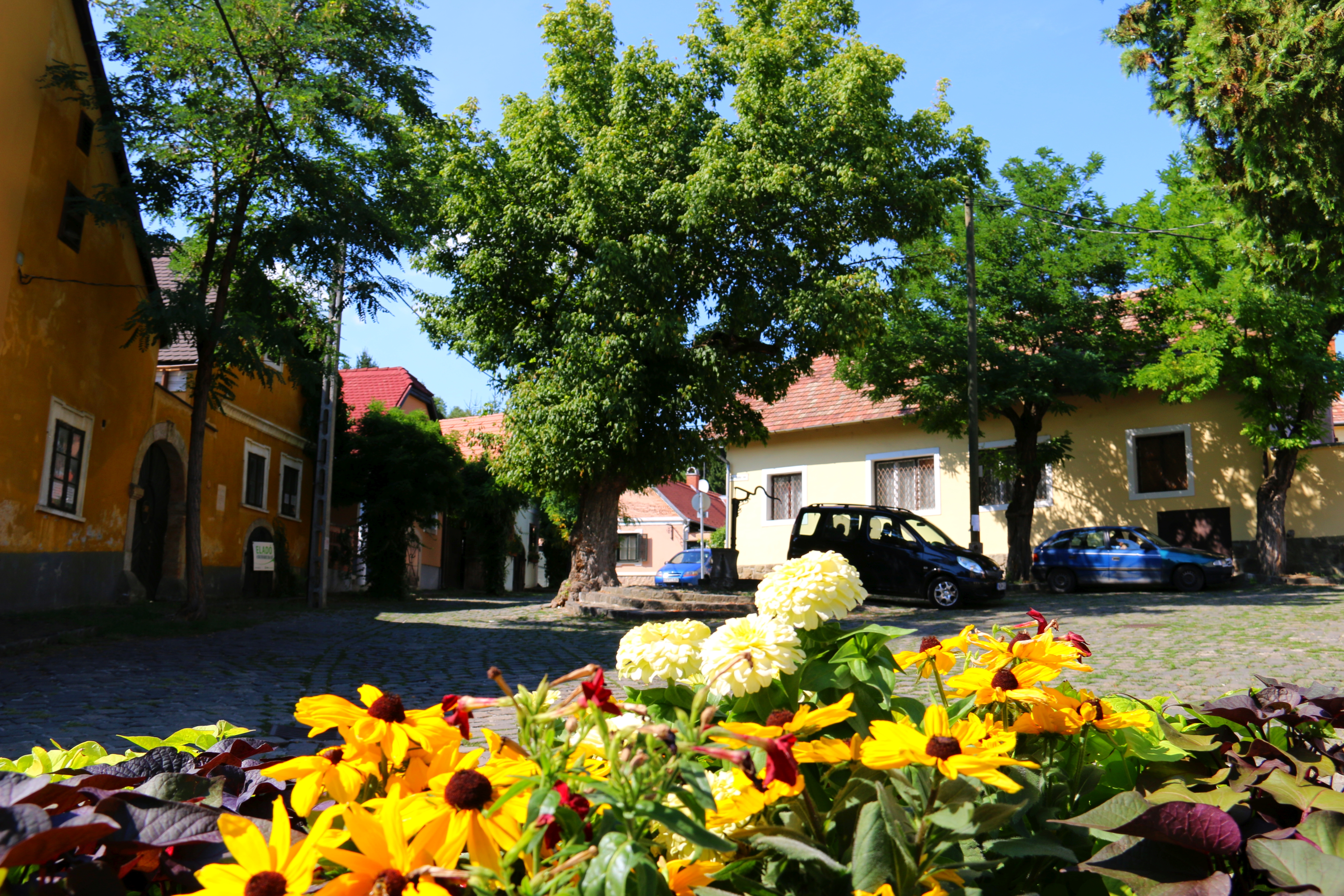

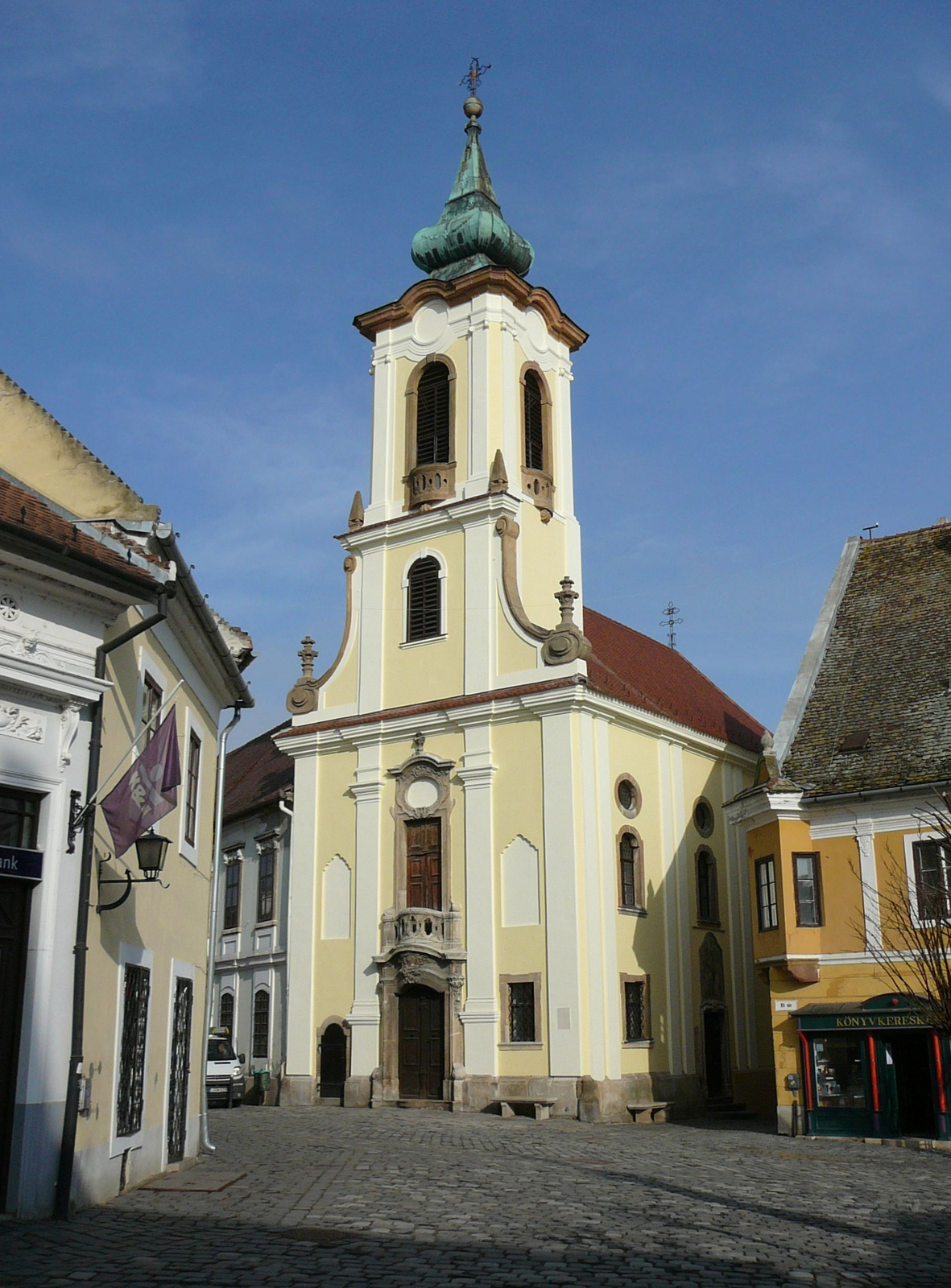

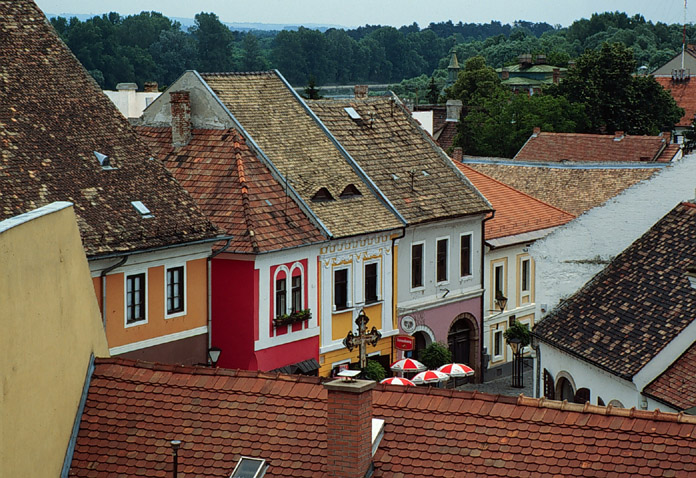

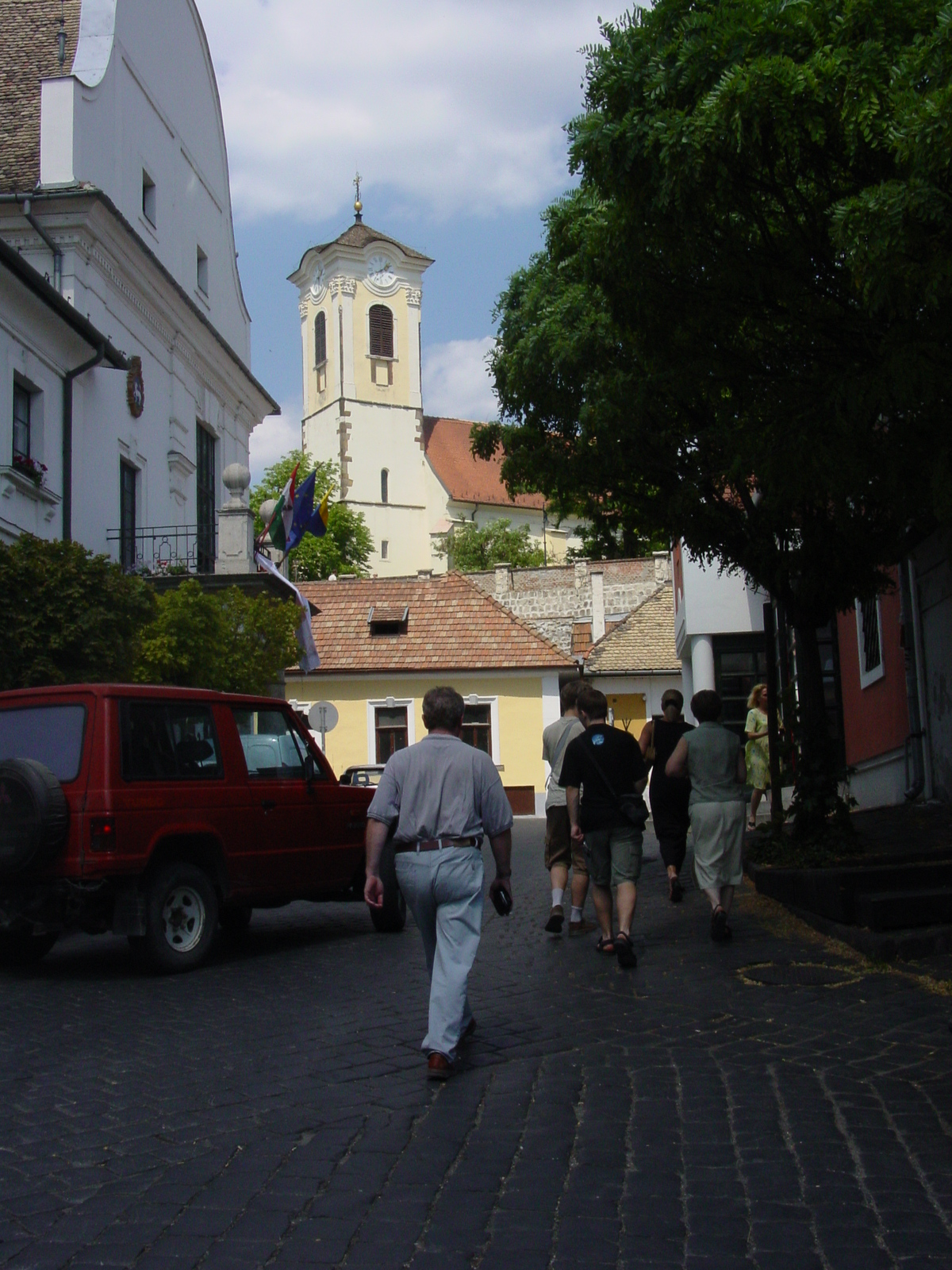

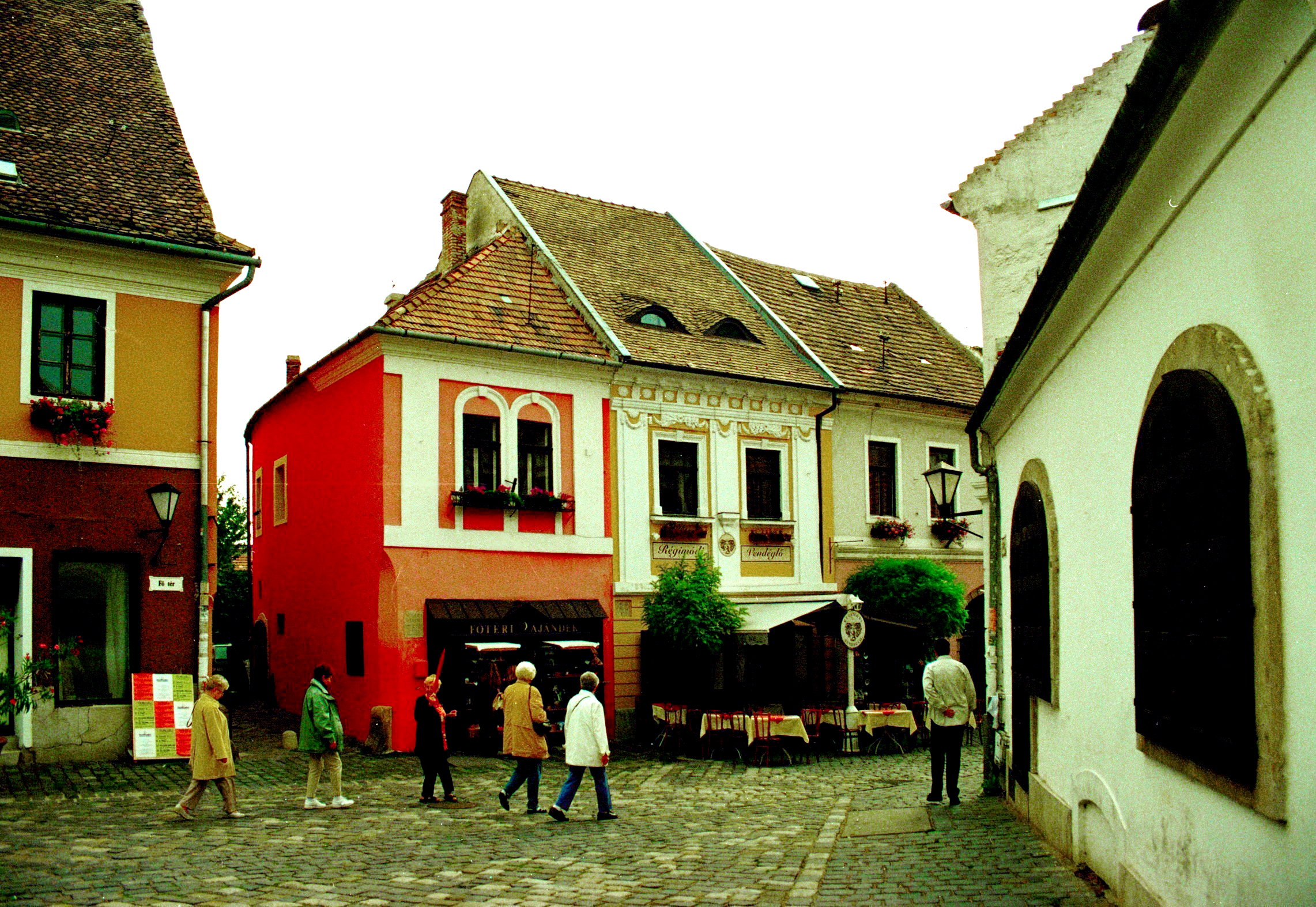

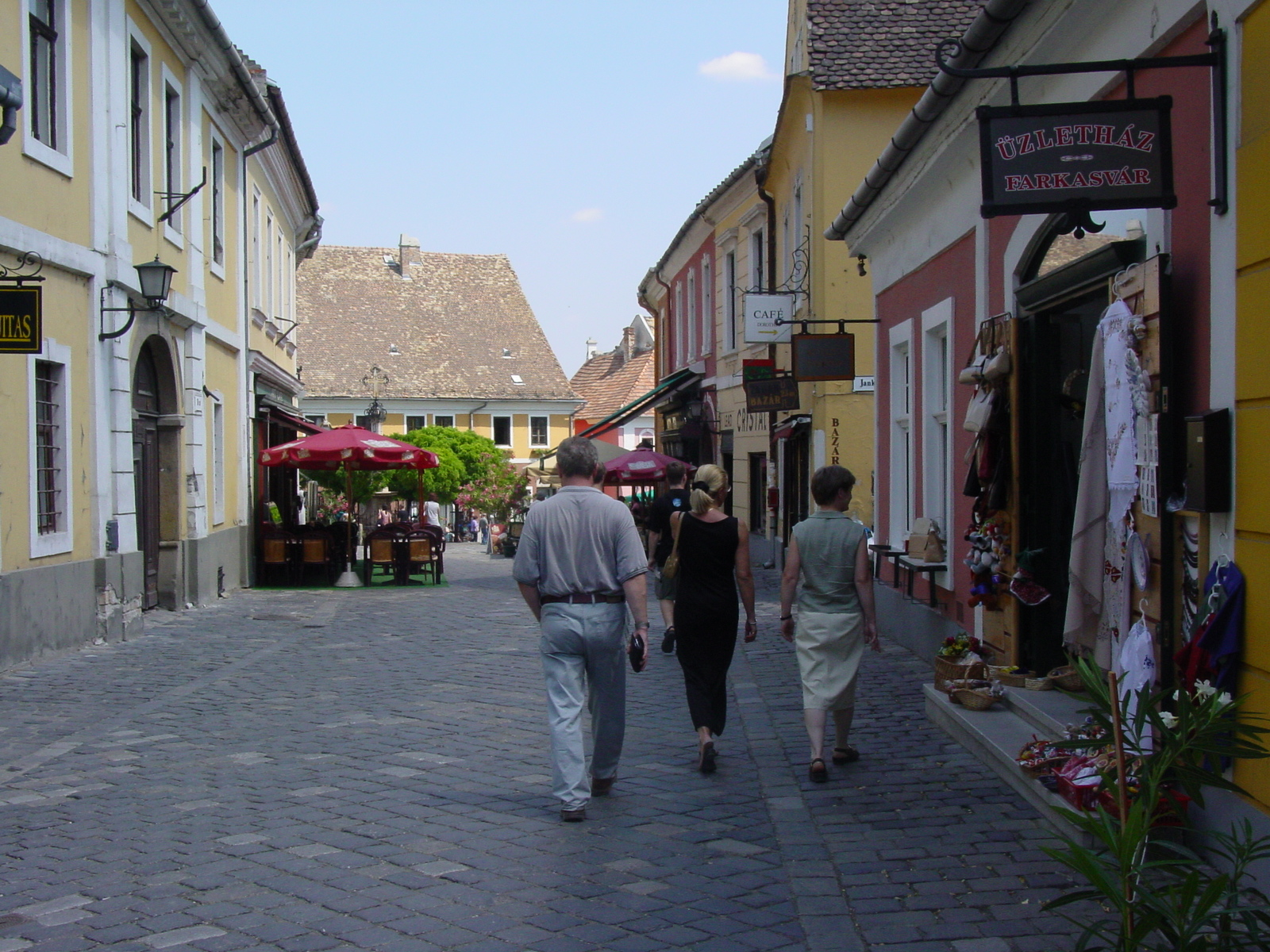

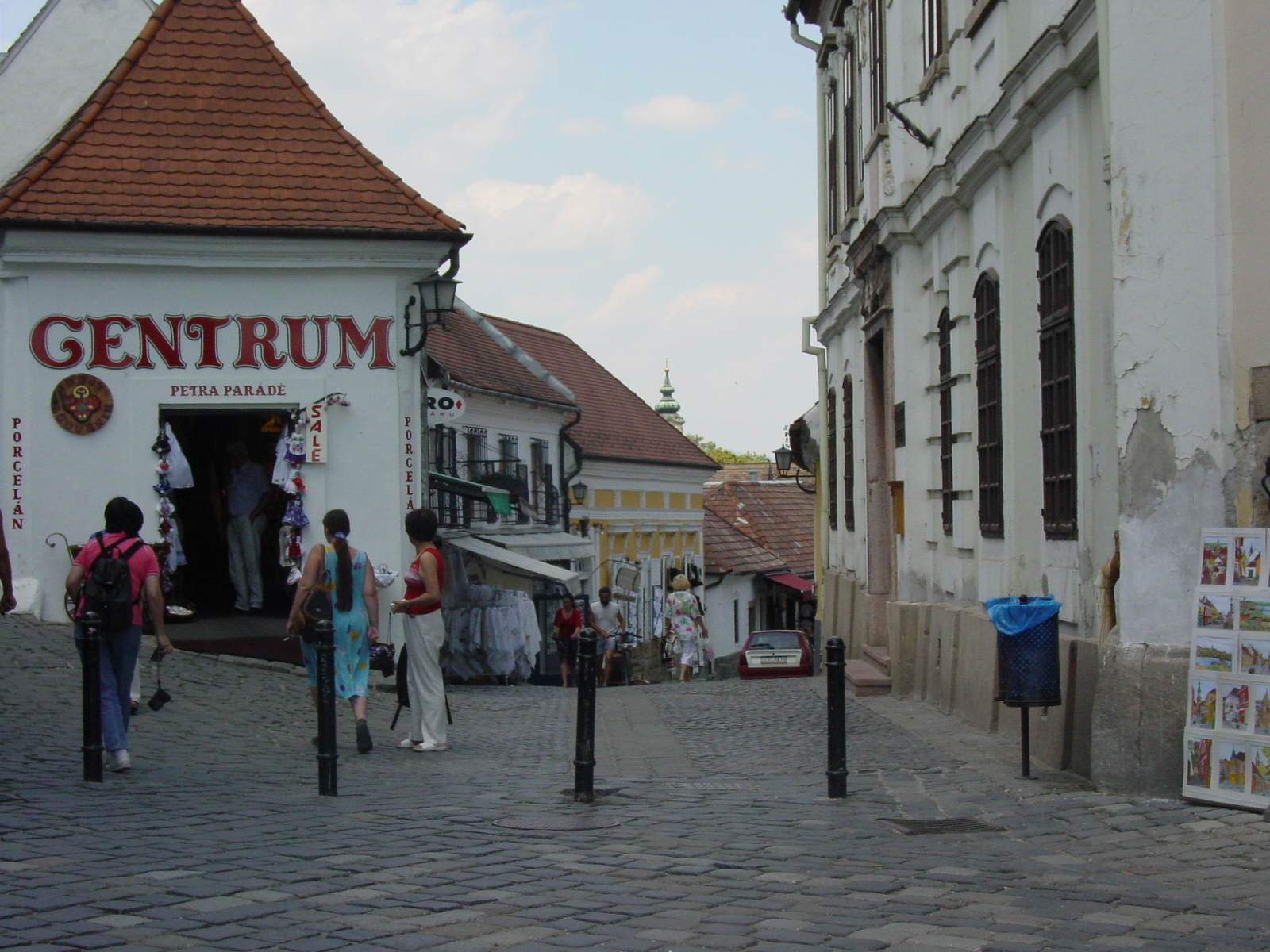

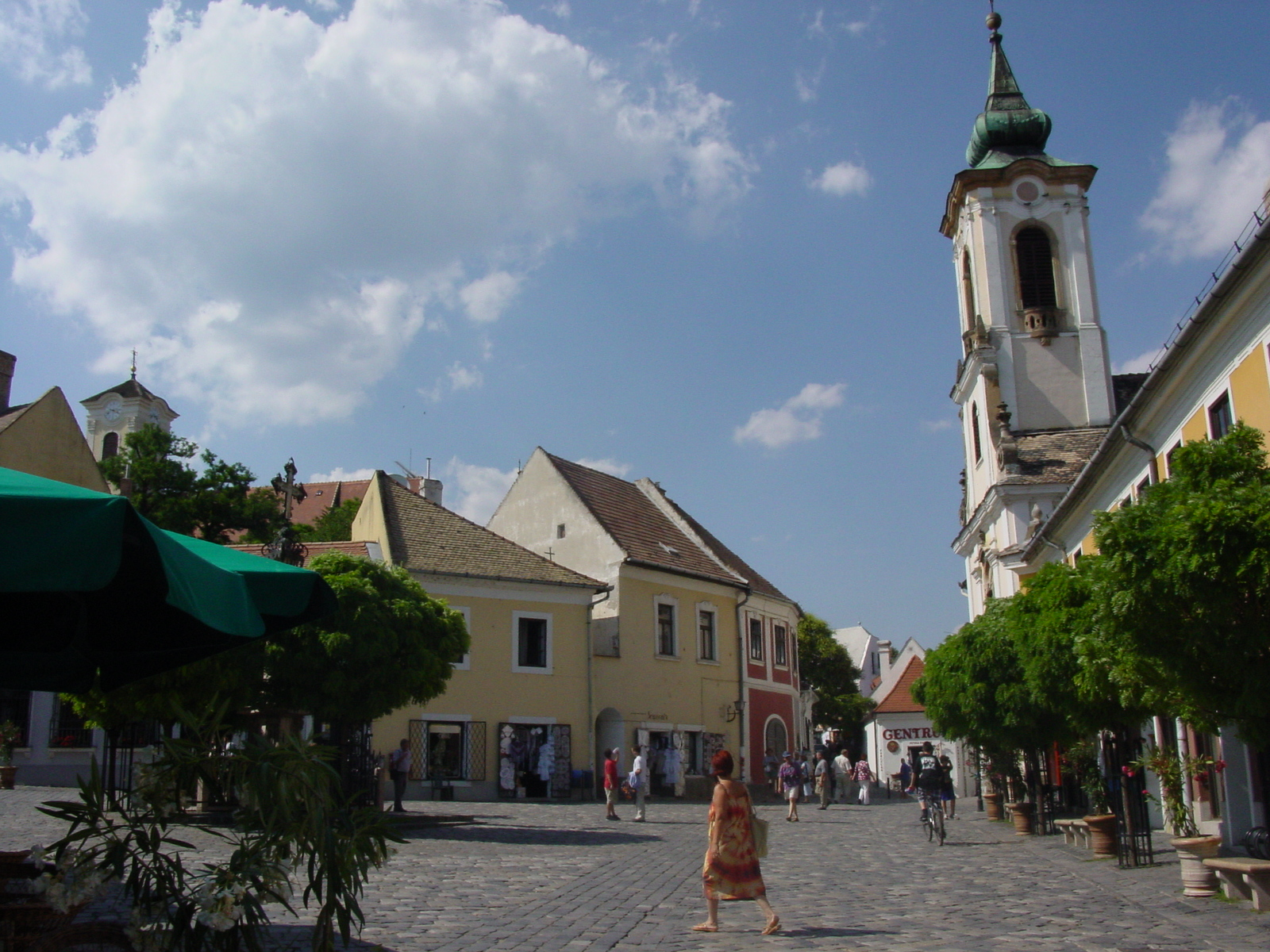

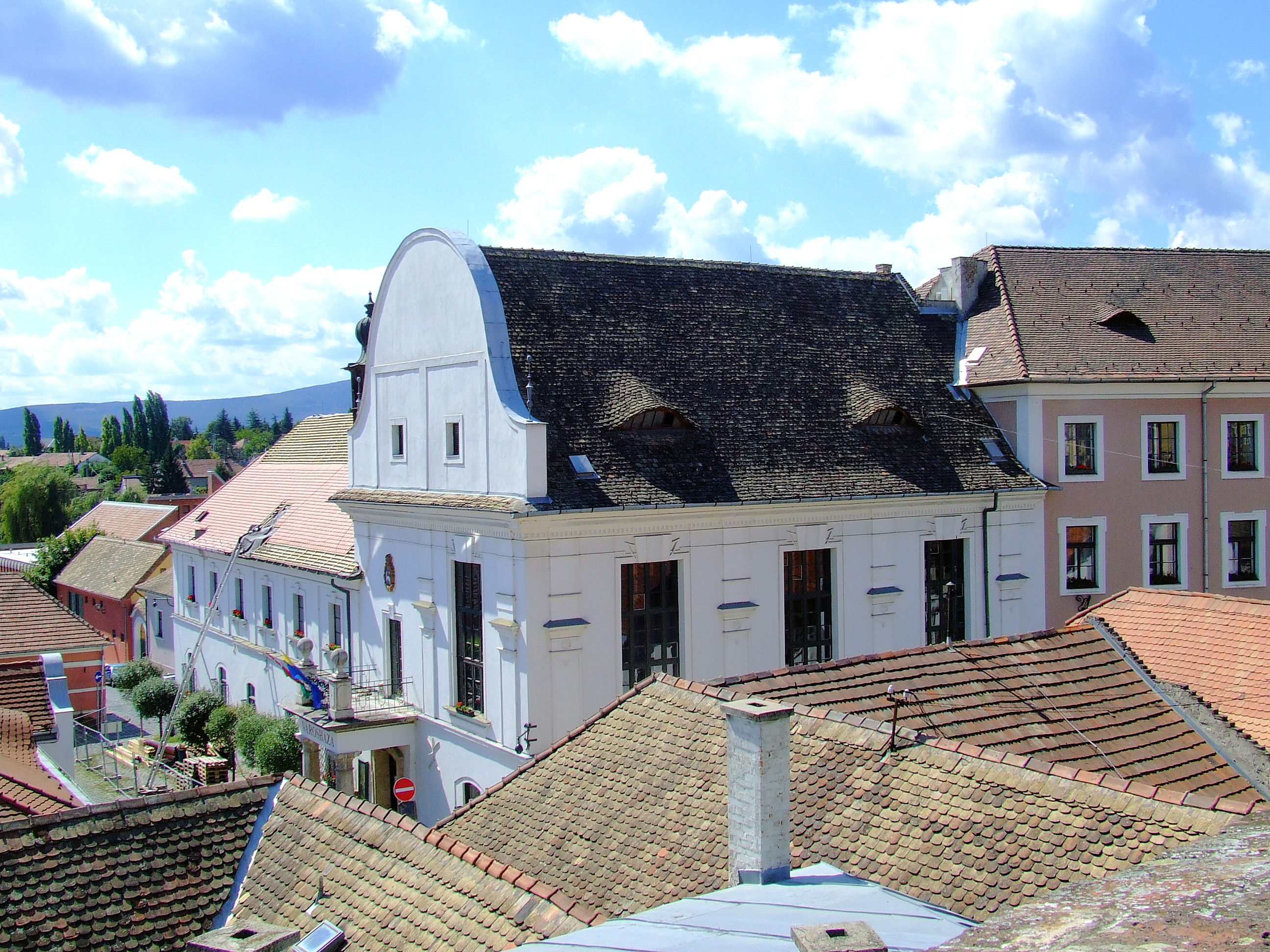

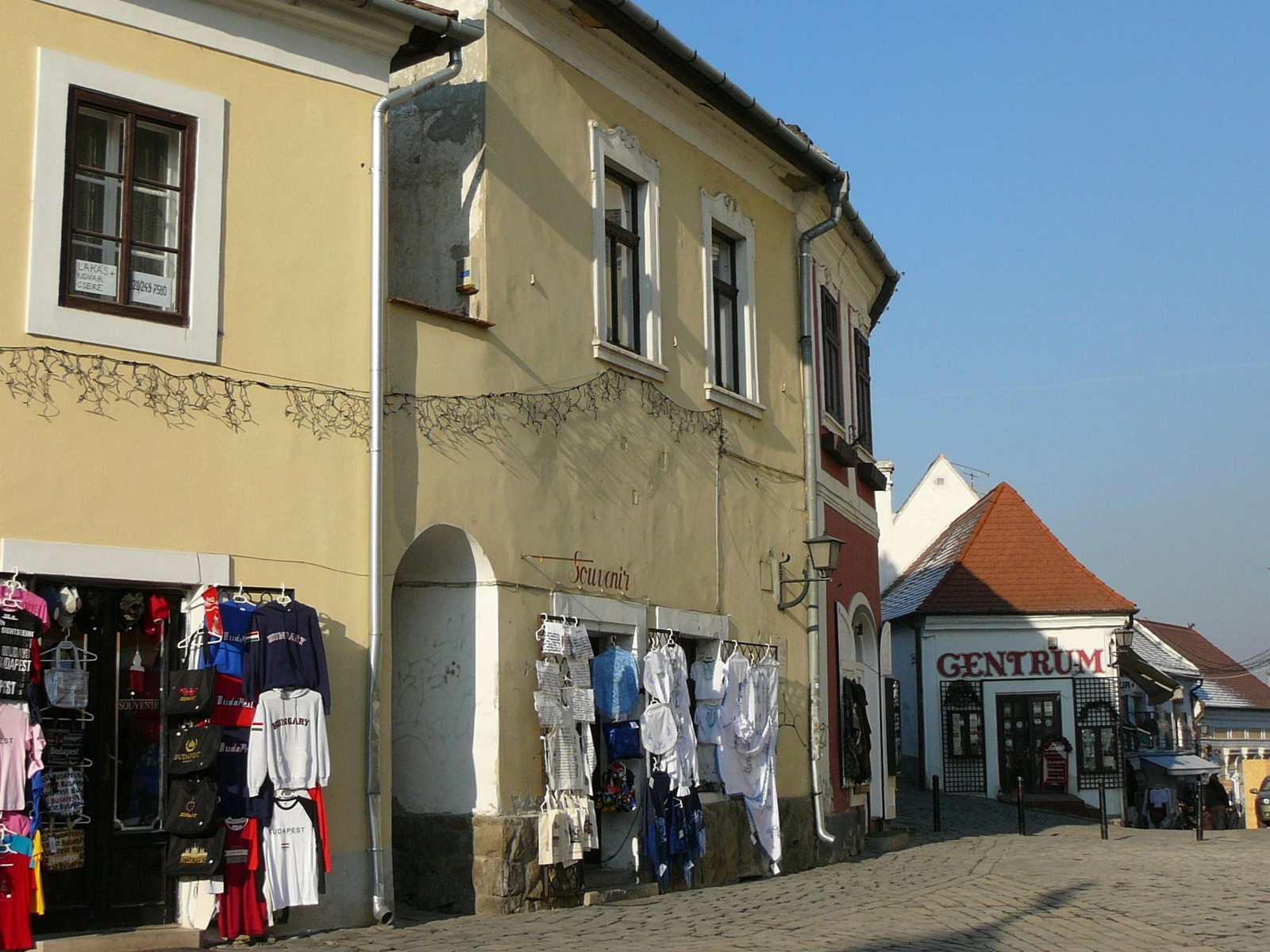

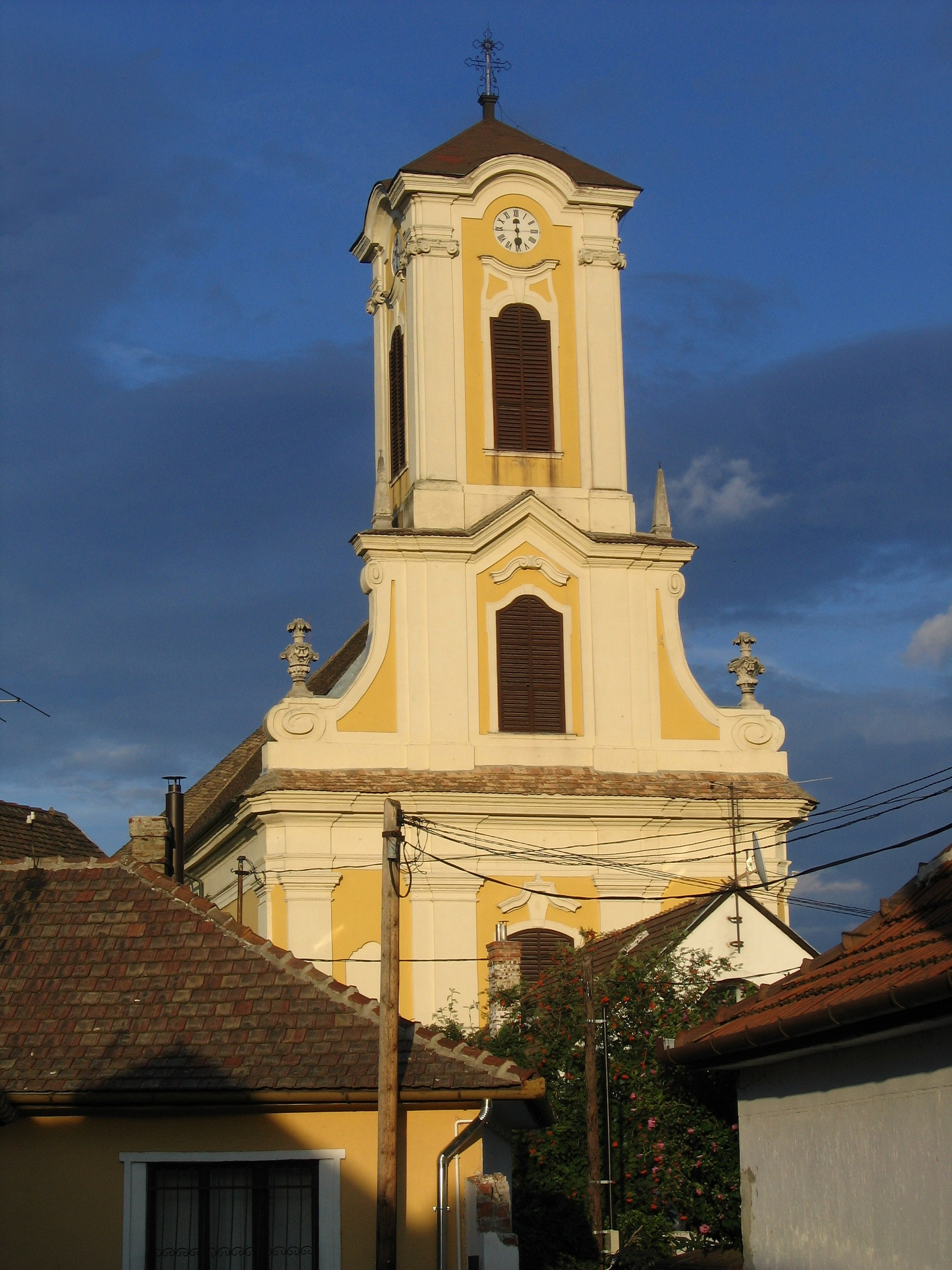

== See also ==
- Serbs in Hungary
- Bulgarians in Hungary

== Sources ==
- Welcome to Szentendre (Official)
- Szentendre in Olden Times and Today
- Touristic and cultural informations
- Day Trips Outside of Budapest: Szentendre
- Travel Information (rec.org, archive)
- Hungarian Open Air Museum (Skanzen)
- Link Collection (Hungarian Only)
- Business Link Collection (Hungarian Only)
- Szentendre travel guide from Wikivoyage
- In Hungarian: Soproni Sándor, Sándyné Wolf Katalin: Szentendre, 1985, Panormáma: magyar városok. ISBN 963 243 248 7
