= Béla Apáti Abkarovics =

Hungarian painter and graphic artist

Béla Apáti Abkarovics (born 1888, Érmihályfalva, Austro-Hungarian Empire - died 1957, Szentendre, Hungary) was a Hungarian painter and graphic artist.

He used his original family name in both Abkarovics and Abkarovits versions, the stage name Apáti-Abkarovics later became his final family name (he was also often mentioned in the press as Apáthy-Abkarovics).

== Biography ==
He began his art studies at the Academy of Fine Arts in Budapest as a student of Károly Ferenczy. From 1911, it can be found in the Nagybánya colony. Here he worked under the proofreading of István Réti and János Thorma.

During World War I, he served in the military for a short time (in Eger, 1916), and after his demobilization, he went on a longer study trip to Austria, the Netherlands and Germany (between 1917 and 1919).

He worked regularly in Nagybánya until 1927, and then worked in Munkács for several years. He settled permanently in Szentendre in the 1930s. He was a member of the Transcarpathian Artists Association, later became a member of KÚT, and in 1945 was elected a member of the Szentendre artist colony.

In 1924, he was featured in the Nagybánya Jubilee Exhibition, and in 1925 and 1927 he participated in the Group Exhibition of Nagybánya Painters. As a member of the artist colony, he participated in group exhibitions of Szentendre artists from 1945. In 1955, he organized a collection exhibition of Szentendre's works. After his death, in 1967, in the Ferenczy Museum in Szentendre, from the pictures of the memorial exhibition. His works can be found in the Hungarian National Gallery, the Munkacs and Nagyvárad museums.

== His style ==
The influence of Sándor Ziffer (1880–1962) can be felt in his paintings, in addition to landscapes and cityscapes (steep mountainsides, forests, high-roofed houses in Szentendre, etc.), he also painted figurative compositions (towboats, forest workers). His art is based upon the Nagybánya traditions of the unity of man and nature. He is equally astute in the field of oil, watercolour and graphics. His contribution in the field of graphic arts involves sketches and linocuts, but the number of his monotypes is also considerable.
