= Szentendre Artists' Colony =

Hungarian art school

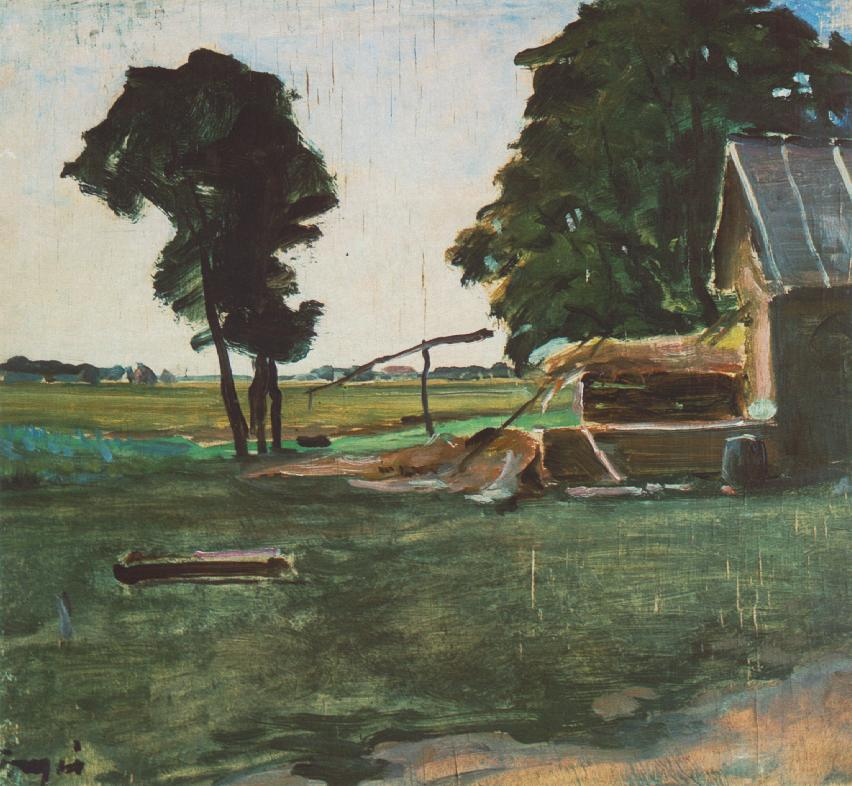
János Tornyai (1896–1936): Farm with Shadoof

Szentendre Artists' Colony existed from the 1920s to the 1930s in the northern part of Szentendre, Hungary.

== Background ==
The colony was founded by the Szentendre Artists' Association. They followed the tradition of the 19th century Nagybánya artists' colony but combined it with the modern styles of the era, mainly surrealism and constructivism.

From the 1930s onwards, the creative art of Lajos Vajda and Dezső Korniss is most directly linked to Szentendre, respectively. They primarily painted the natural and built environment of this landscape and drew their motifs from the traditions of the inhabitants living here. Among the modern styles, they created primarily in the spirit of surrealism and non-figurative art.

Imre Ámos (the "Hungarian Chagall") also contributed to the establishment of surrealism in Szentendre.

Due to their influence, many other artists were connected to Szentendre and his surroundings, for example Piroska Szántó, Endre Bálint, or his friend János Tornyai also painted in Szentendre in the early 1930s. István Ilosvai Varga, Miklós Göllner, Andor Kántor, Pál Miháltz, Béla Czóbel, Erzsébet Vaszkó, Jenő Barcsay, János Kmetty, Jenő Kerényi, Pál Deim, and László Balogh belonged more to the constructive trend. The creators of the Szentendre Artists' Colony together with all the artists from Szentendre organized collective exhibitions in Budapest and Szentendre.

== Members ==
=== Prominent painters ===
- Barcsay Jenő
- Deim Pál
- Kerényi Jenő
- Körniss Dezső
- Lajos Vajda

=== Other members ===
- Bánáti Sverák József
- Bánovszky Miklós
- Henrik Heintz
- Jeges Ernő
- Onódi Béla
- Paizs Goebel Jenő
- Rozgonyi László

== Gallery ==
Some paintings of the artists

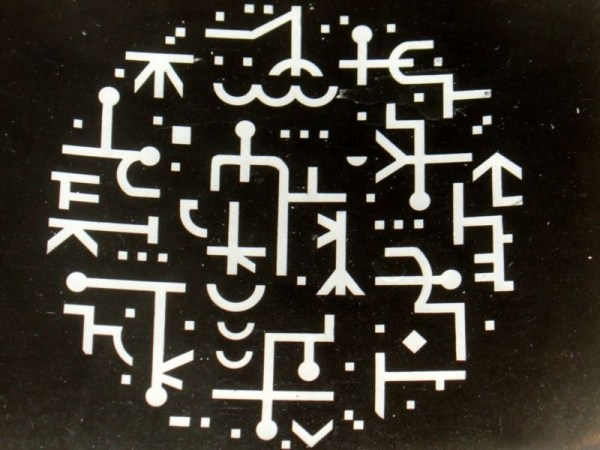

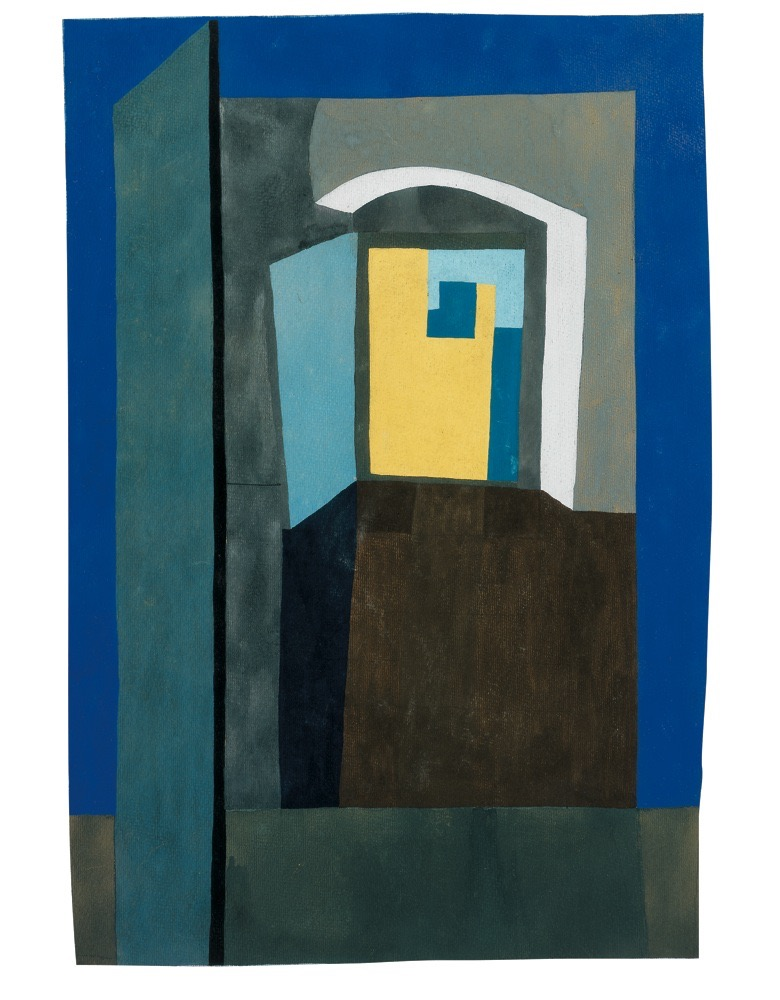

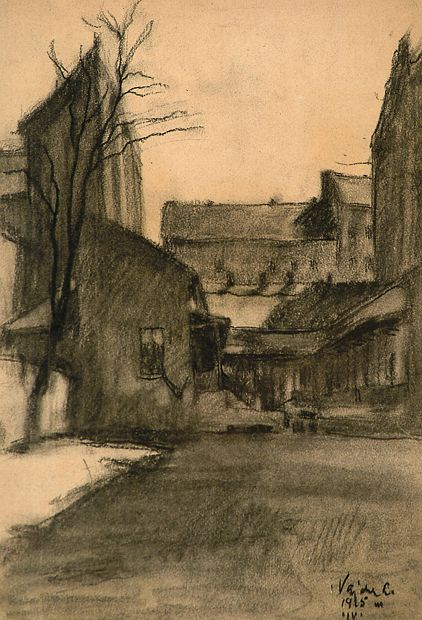

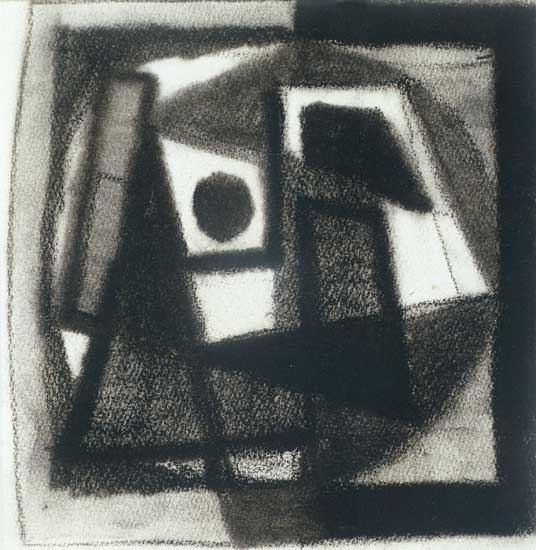

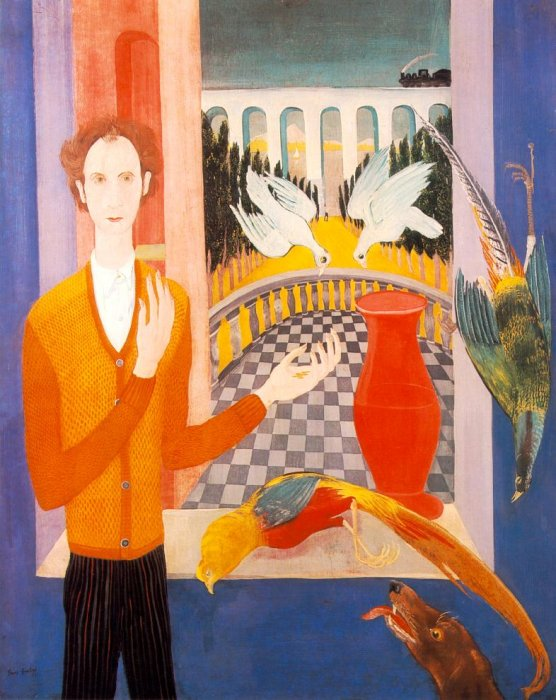

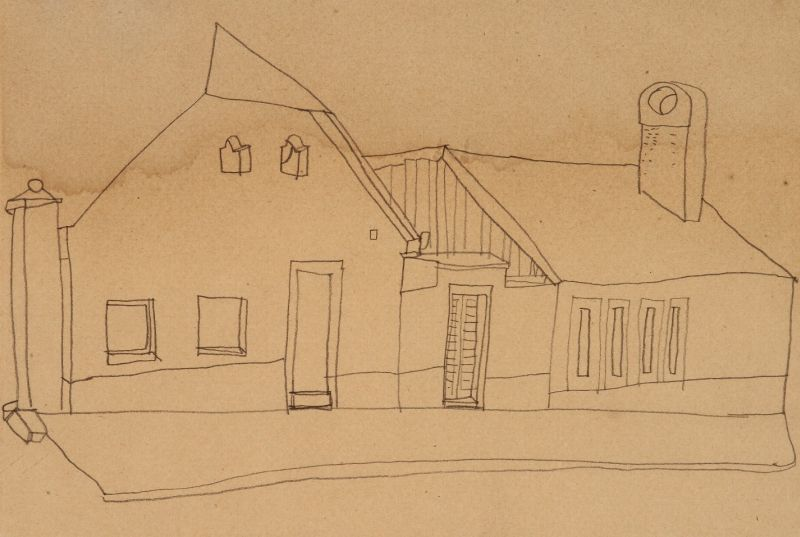

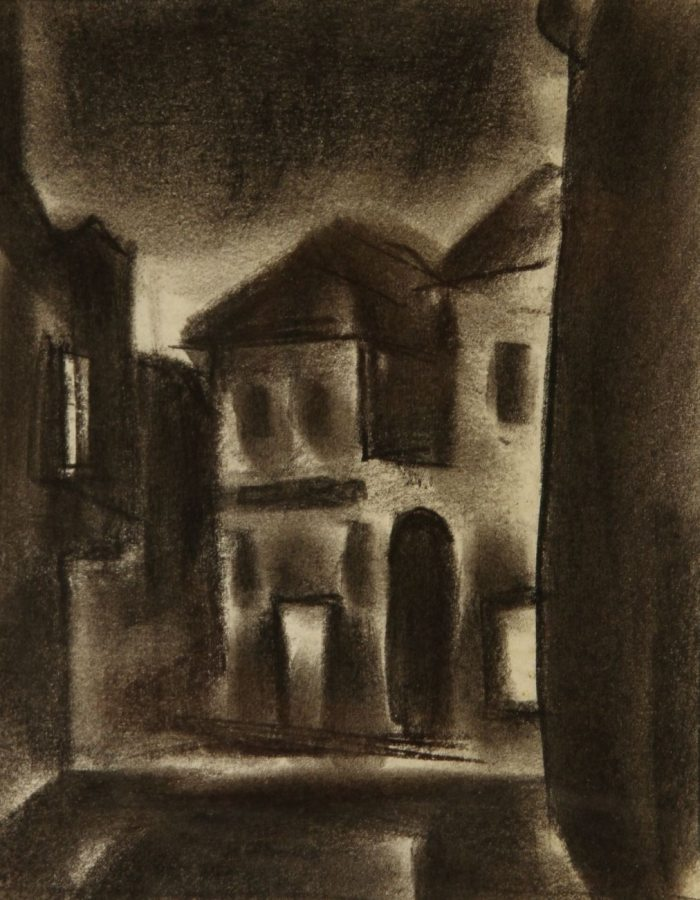

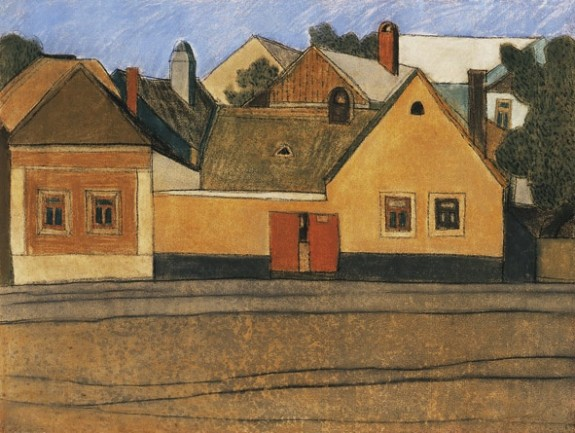
