= Henrik Heintz =

Hungarian painter

- Born: Henrik Heintz; 1896; Budapest
- Died: 1955 (aged 58–59); Szakcs

Henrik Heintz (1896–1955) was a Hungarian painter.

He studied at the Hungarian University of Fine Arts and in Munich. He worked at the Miskolc residency, the Szentendre Artists' Colony, and toured Italy in 1927. He founded the Szentendre Society of Painters in 1928.
