= Hungarian Open-air Museum =

Open-air museum in Hungary

Coordinates: 47.694°N 19.048°E

- Wooden church at the Szentendre open air ethnographic museum.jpg Wooden church at the Szentendre open air ethnographic museum

The Hungarian Open-air Museum (Hungarian: Szentendrei Szabadtéri Néprajzi Múzeum) is Hungary's largest outdoor ethnographic collection, founded in 1967. The open-air museum shows Carpathian folk architecture, and life in various regions of Hungary. Its collection consists of a mix of authentic structures transported to the 63 hectare museum site, and precise replicas of folk architecture. The permanent collection features exhibits spanning the period between the mid 18th century and the mid 20th century.

Inspired by the creation of Skansen, established in Stockholm in 1891, the Hungarian facility in Szentendre was founded in 1967 after years of preparation by ethnographers. Opened as the "Village Museum Department" of the Budapest Ethnographic Museum, in 1972 it became independent. It now functions as a non-profit, providing hands-on education about Hungarian history, folk traditions, and material culture. The museum strives to popularize Hungarian culture on both a national and international level.

There are eight areas of the museum:

- North Hungarian Village
- Upland Market Town
- Upper-Tisza
- Great Plains
- Southern Transdanubia
- Bakony, Balaton Uplands
- Western Transdanubia
- Kisalföld
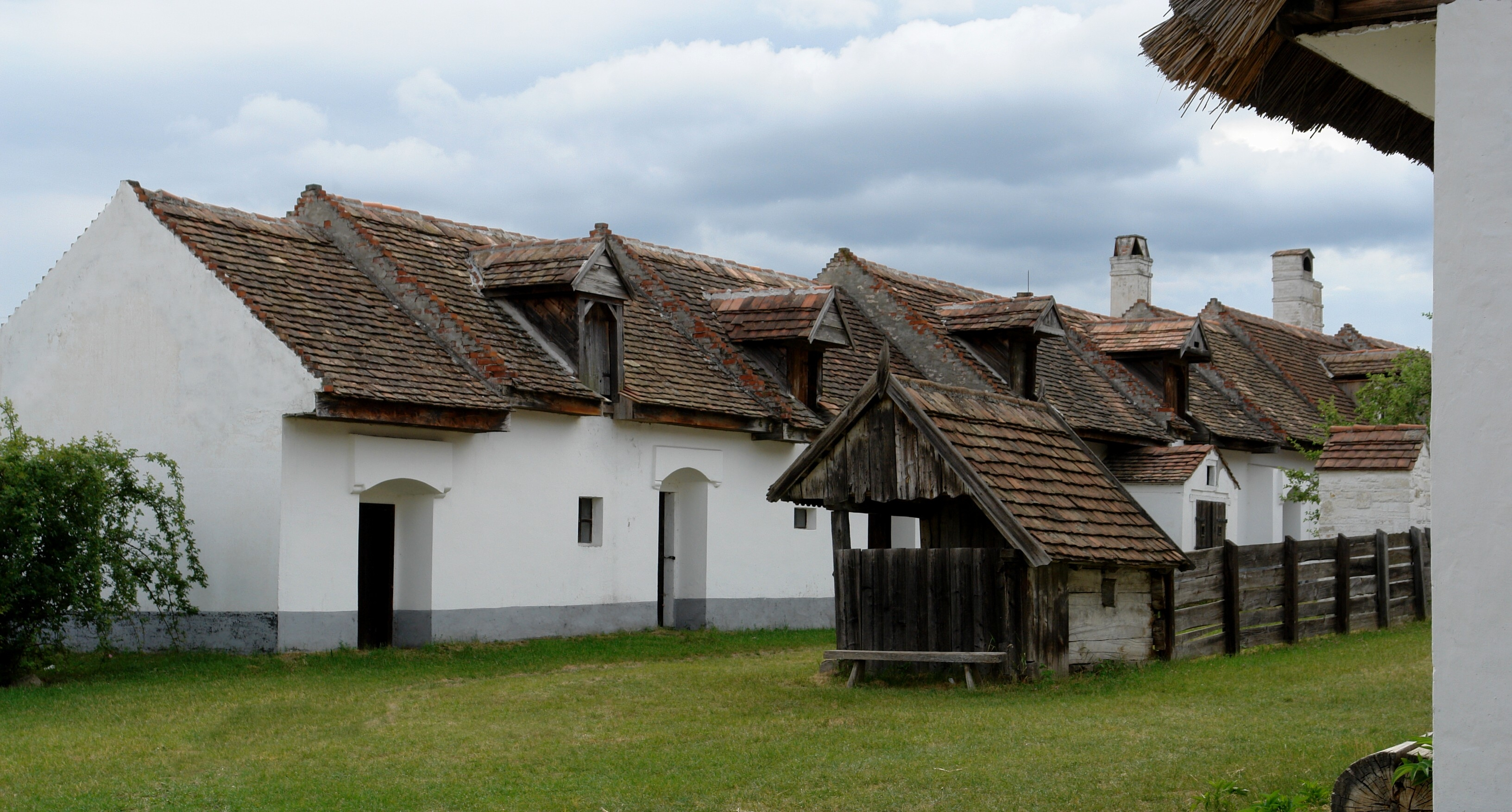
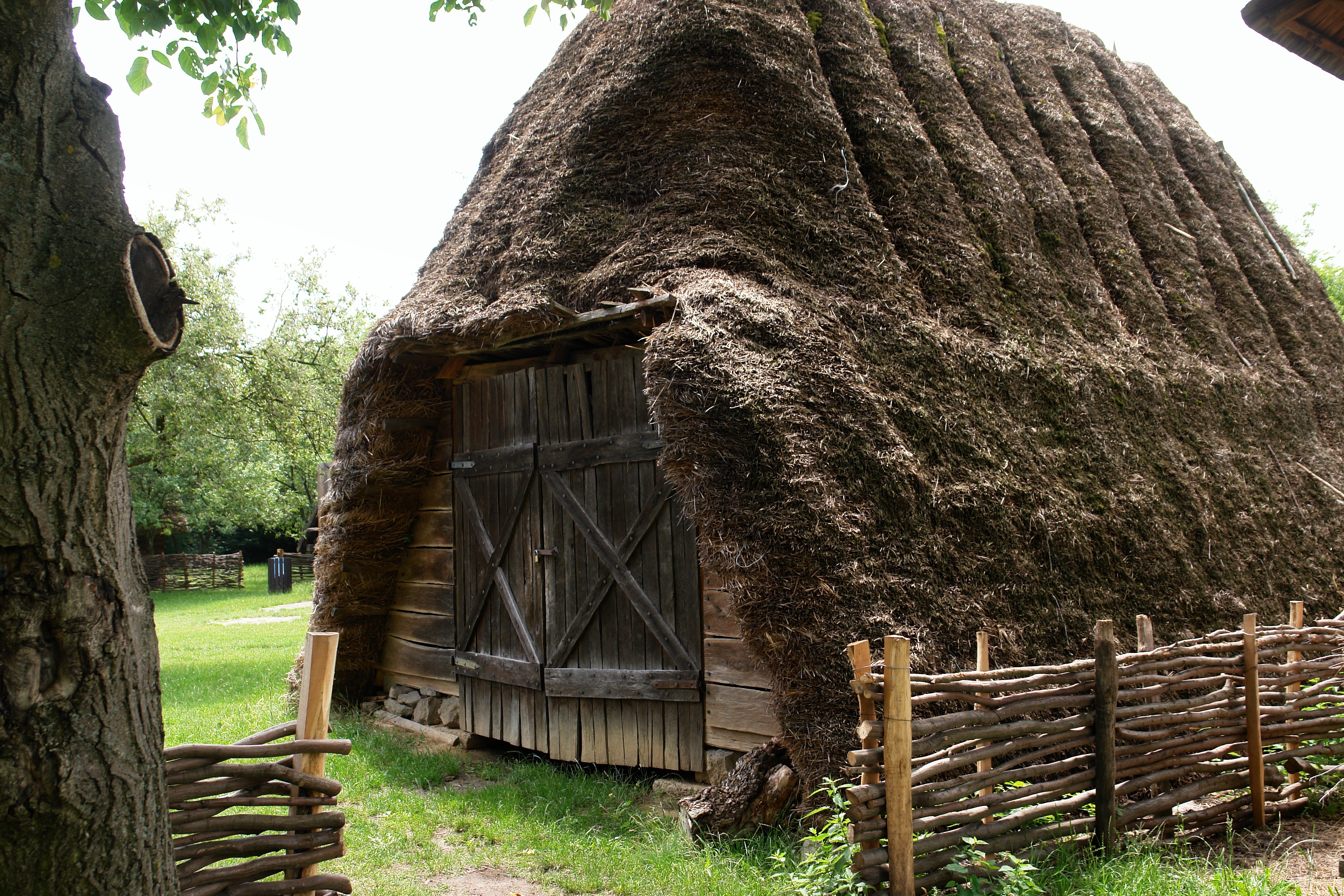
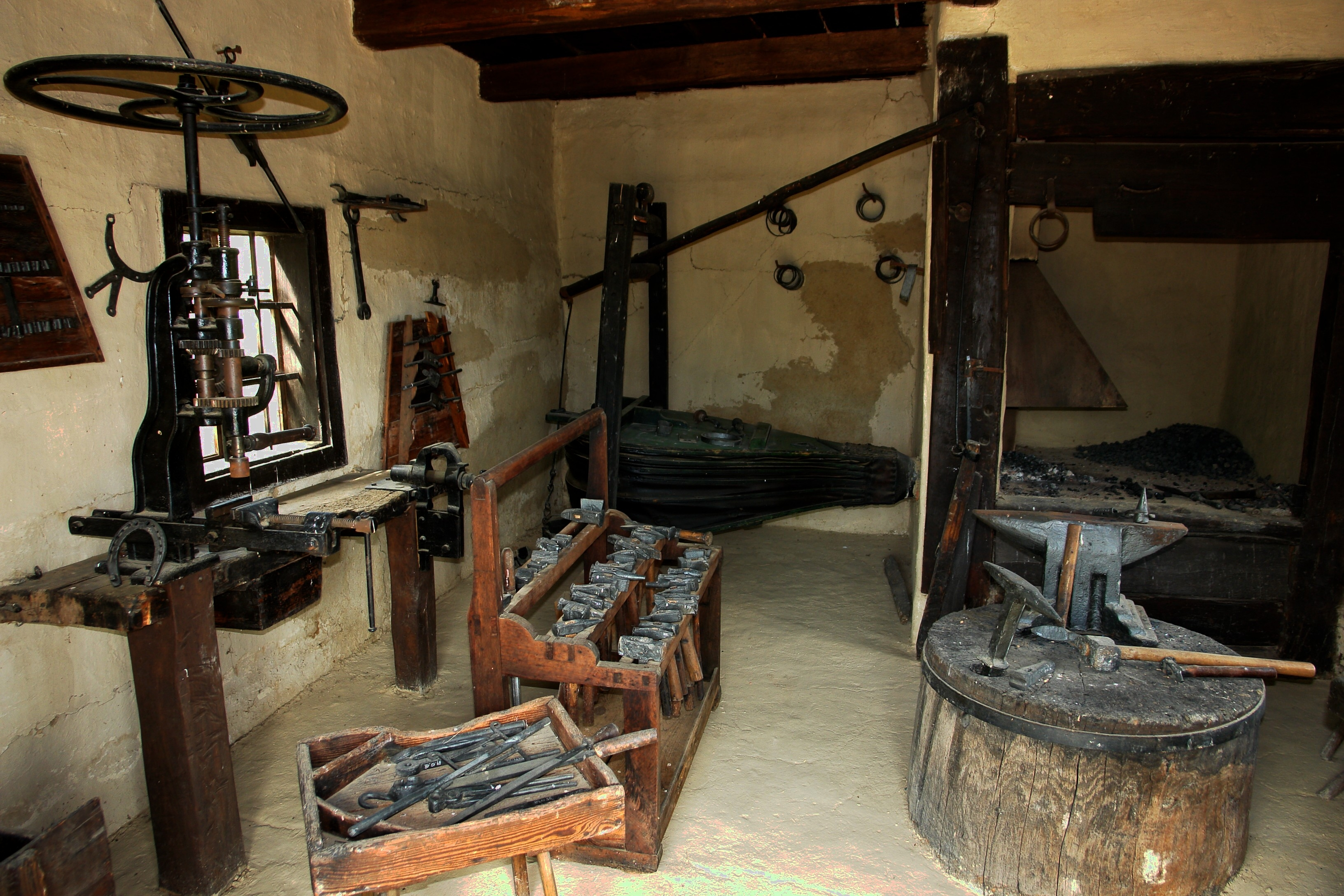
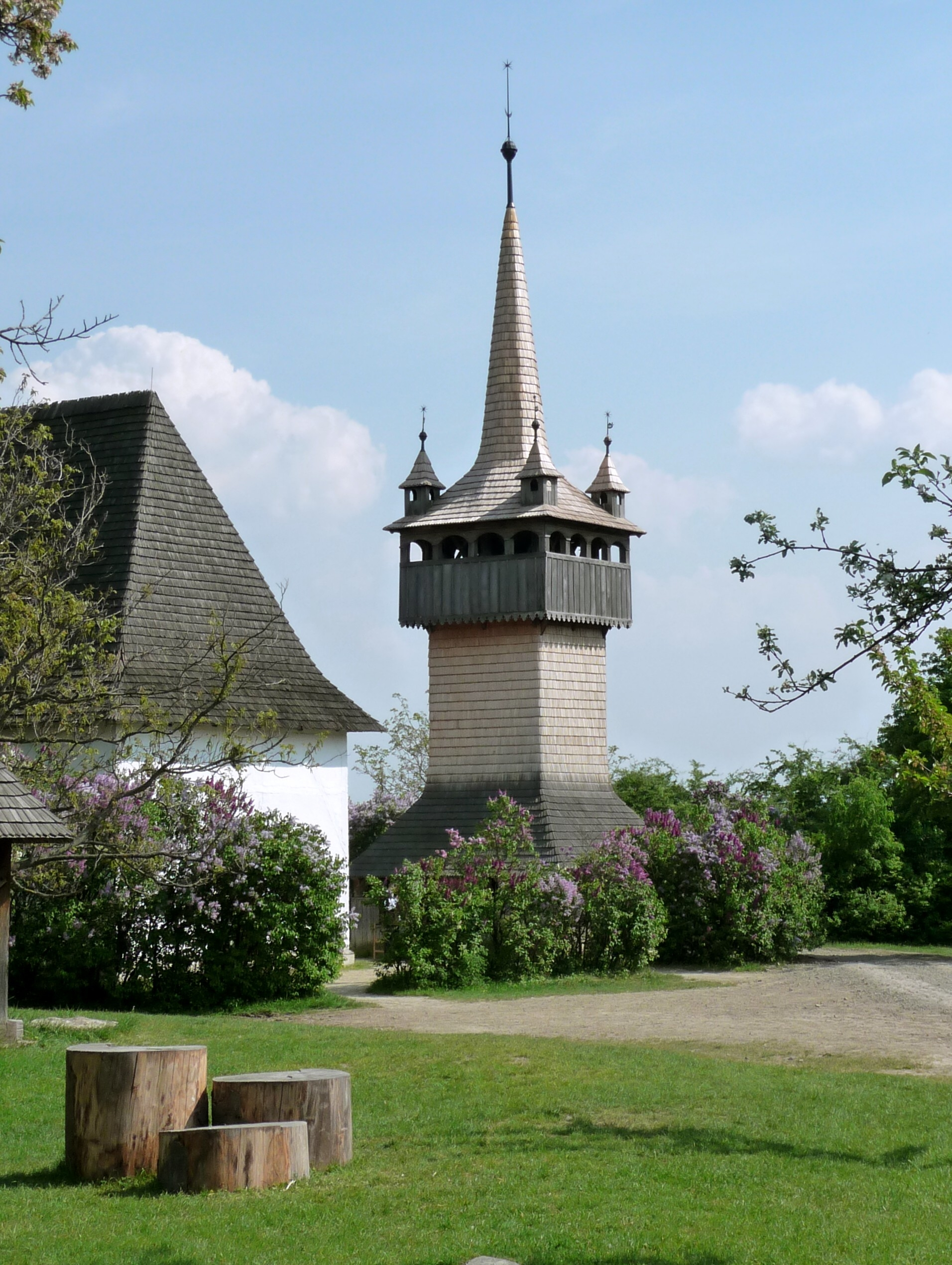
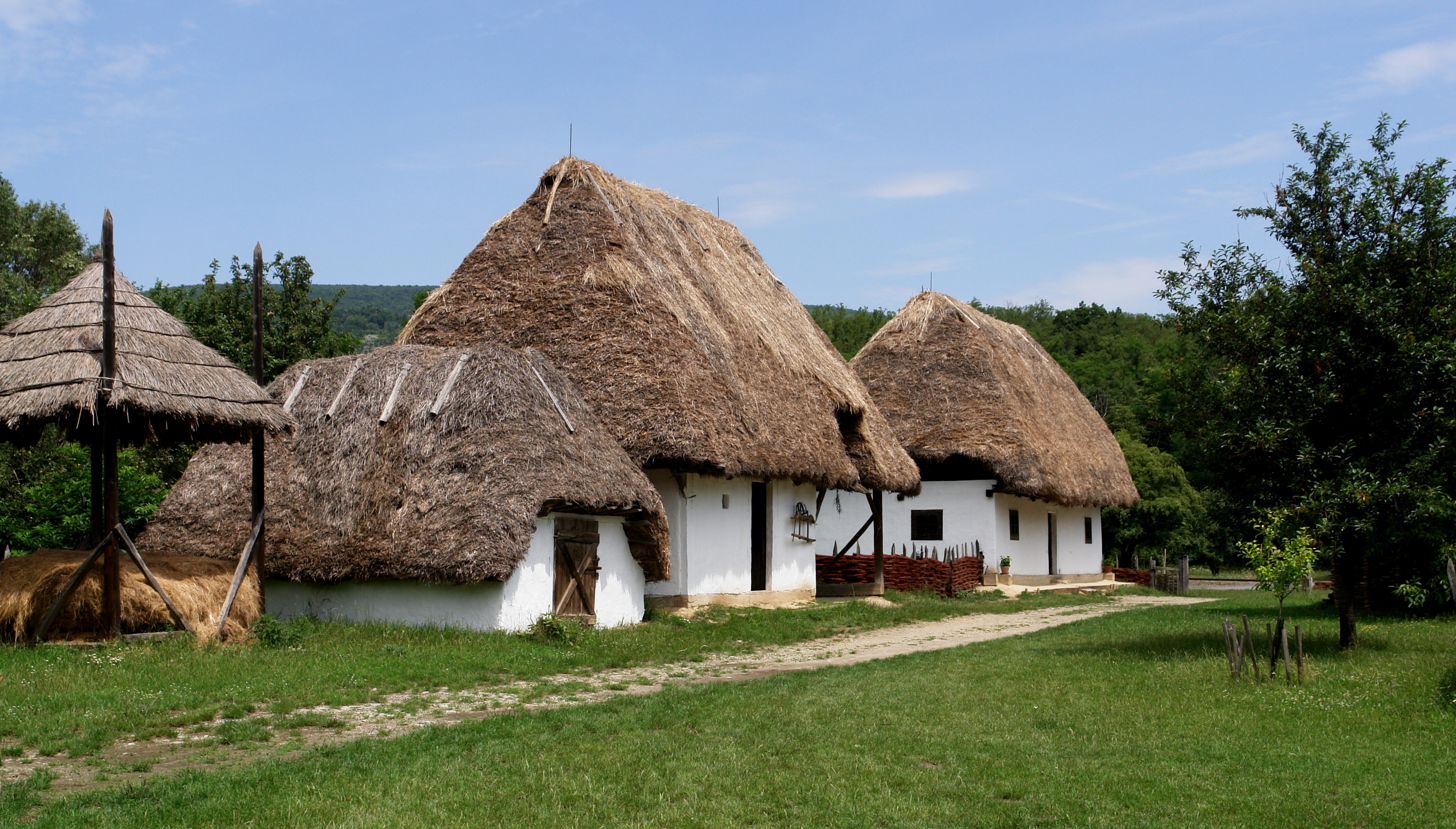
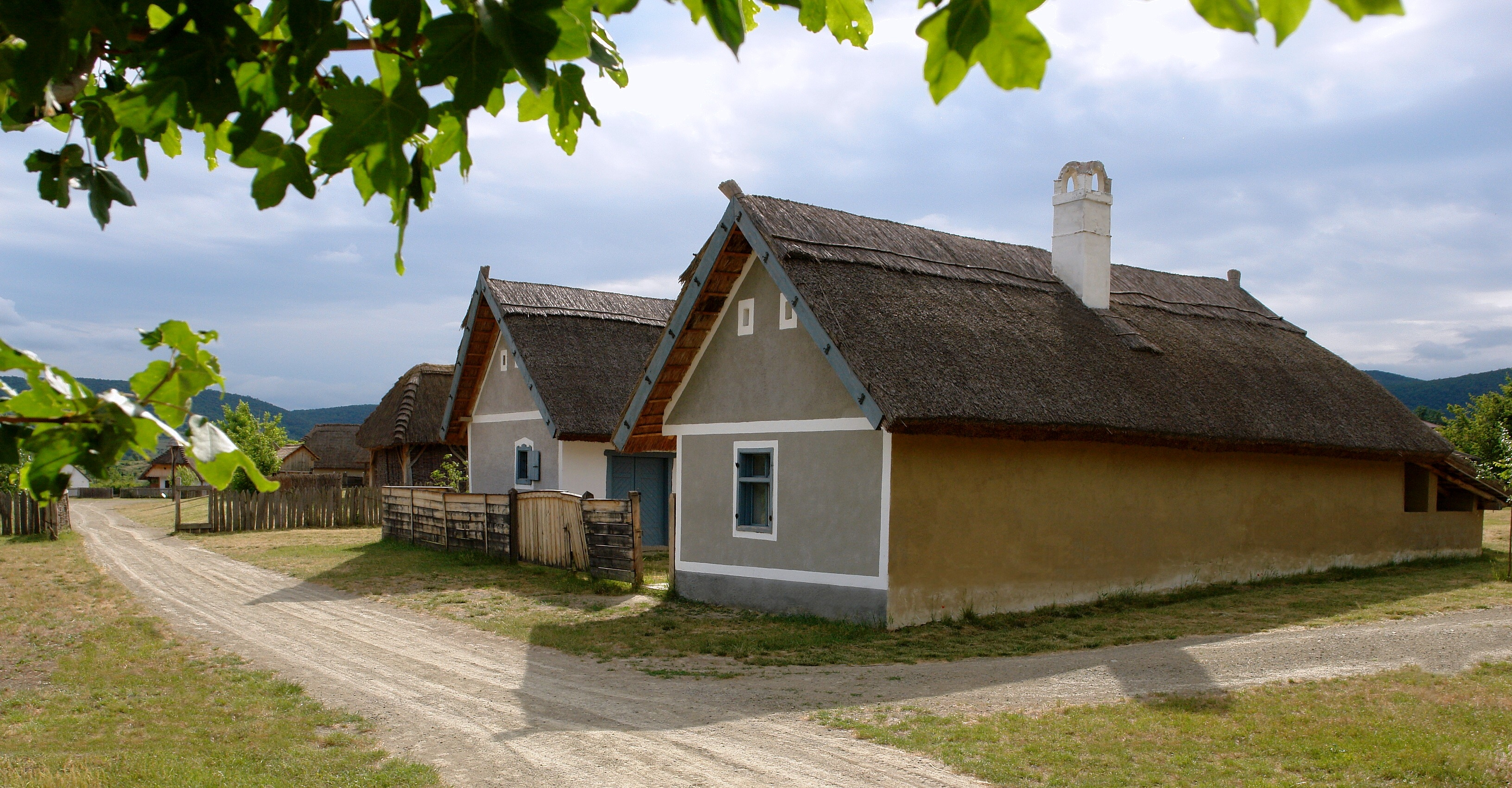
