= Ludwig von Herterich =

German painter

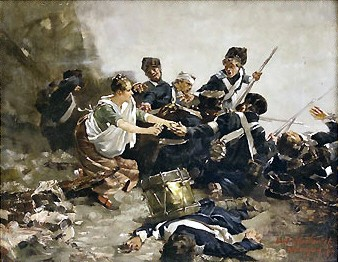
- Ludwig Herterich: Johanna Stegen, the Heroine of Lüneburg (scene from the Napoleonic Wars), 1887
- Born: Ludwig Herterich; 1856; Etzenhausen, Dachau, Kingdom of Bavaria
- Died: 1932 (aged 75–76); New York City, U.S.
- Known for: History painting, portraits, art education
- Movement: Munich School
- Awards: Order of Maximilian, 1908

Ludwig von Herterich (13 October 1856, Ansbach – 25 December 1932, Etzenhausen, today in Dachau) was a German painter and art teacher. He is best known as a painter of portraits and history paintings and is a representative of the Munich School.

== Biography ==
He was the son of a sculptor and art restorer, Franz Herterich, and the younger brother of painter Johann Caspar Herterich. He taught at the Kunstschule Stuttgart and then from 1898 as a professor at the Academy of Fine Arts Munich. His pupils included Karl Caspar, Maria Caspar-Filser, Leo Delitz, Adolf Erbslöh, David Karfunkle, Käthe Kollwitz, Hermann Mühlen (1886–1964), Walter Püttner, Julius Seyler, Maria Slavona, and Anton Zilzer. For his services to art, he was awarded the Order of Maximilian in 1908 and made a life peer.

Herterich was heavily involved along with others in producing the pictorial art for Schloss Wolfsbrunn in the Ore Mountains.
