= André Kertész =

Hungarian photographer (1894–1985)

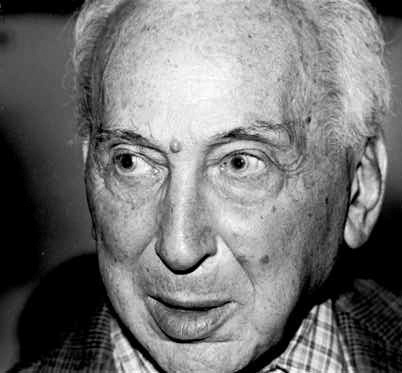
- Kertész in 1982
- Born: Andor Kertész; 2 July 1894; Budapest, Austria-Hungary
- Died: 28 September 1985 (aged 91); New York City, U.S.
- Occupation: Photographer
- Spouses: Rogi André; Elizabeth Saly
- Website: https://www.andrekertesz.org

André Kertész (French: [kɛʁtɛs]; 2 July 1894 – 28 September 1985), born Andor Kertész (Hungarian: [ˈɒndor ˈkɛrteːs]), was a Hungarian-born photographer known for his groundbreaking contributions to photographic composition and the photo essay. In the early years of his career, his then-unorthodox camera angles and style prevented his work from gaining wider recognition. Kertész never felt that he had gained the worldwide recognition he deserved. Today he is considered one of the seminal figures of 20th century photography.

Expected by his family to work as a stockbroker, Kertész pursued photography independently as an autodidact, and his early work was published primarily in magazines, a major market in those years. This continued until much later in his life, when Kertész stopped accepting commissions. He served briefly in World War I and moved to Paris in 1925, then the artistic capital of the world, against the wishes of his family. In Paris he worked for France's first illustrated magazine called VU. Involved with many young immigrant artists and the Dada movement, he achieved critical and commercial success.

Due to German persecution of the Jews and the threat of World War II, Kertész decided to emigrate to the United States in 1936, where he had to rebuild his reputation through commissioned work. In the 1940s and 1950s, he stopped working for magazines and began to achieve greater international success. His career is generally divided into four periods, based on where he was working and where his work was most prominently known. They are called the Hungarian period, the French period, the American period, and, toward the end of his life, the International period.

== Biography ==
=== Early life and education ===
Andor Kertész was born on 2 July 1894 in Budapest to the middle-class Jewish family of Lipót Kertész, a bookseller, and his wife, Ernesztin Hoffmann. Andor, known as "Bandi" to his friends, was the middle child of three sons, including Imre and Jenő. When Lipót died in 1908 from tuberculosis, the widowed Ernesztin was without a source of income to support their three children. Ernesztin's brother, Lipót Hoffmann, provided for the family and acted much like a father to the boys. The family soon moved to Hoffman's country property in Szigetbecse. Kertész grew up in a leisurely pace of life and pastoral setting that would shape his later career path.

Hoffman paid for his middle nephew's business classes at the Academy of Commerce until his 1912 graduation, and arranged his hiring by the stock exchange soon after. Unlike his older brother Imre, who worked at the exchange in Budapest for all his life, Kertész had little interest in the field. He was drawn to illustrated magazines and to activities like fishing and swimming in the Danube River near his uncle's property.

Kertész's first encounters with magazine photography inspired him to learn photography. He was also influenced by certain paintings by Lajos Tihanyi and Gyula Zilzer, as well as by poetry.

=== Hungarian period ===
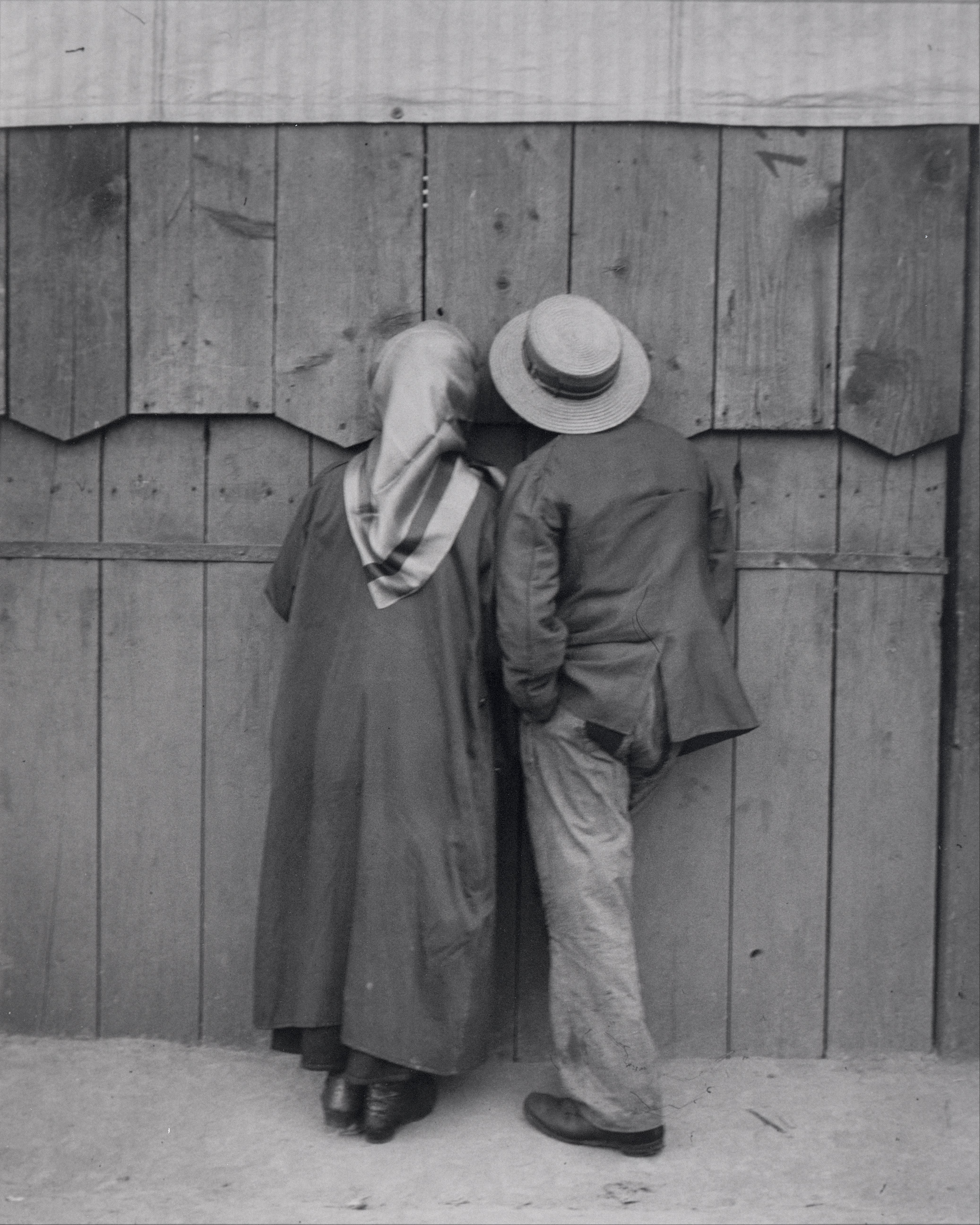
Circus, Budapest, 19 May 1920

After earning enough money, Kertész quickly bought his first camera (an ICA box camera) in 1912, despite his family's protests to continue his career in business. In his free time, he photographed the local peasants, Romani people, and landscape of the surrounding Hungarian Plains (the puszta). His first photograph is believed to be Sleeping Boy, Budapest, 1912. His photographs were first published in 1917 in the magazine Érdekes Újság, during World War I, while Kertész was serving in the Austro-Hungarian army. As early as 1914 (for example, Eugene, 1914), his distinctive and mature style was already evident.

In 1914, at the age of 20, he was sent to the frontline, where he took photographs of life in the trenches with a lightweight camera (a Goerz Tenax). Most of these photographs were destroyed during the violence of the Hungarian Revolution of 1919. Wounded in 1915 by a bullet, Kertész suffered temporary paralysis of his left arm.

He was sent for convalescence to a military hospital in Budapest, but was later transferred to Esztergom, where he continued to take photographs. These included a self-portrait for a competition in the magazine Borsszem Jankó. His most famous piece of this period was Underwater Swimmer, Esztergom, 1917, the only surviving work of a series of a swimmer whose image is distorted by the water. Kertész explored the subject more thoroughly in his series of "Distortions" photographs during the early 1930s.

Kertész did not heal soon enough to return to combat, and with peace in 1918, he returned to the stock exchange. There he met his future wife Erzsebet Salomon (later changed to Elizabeth Saly, also spelled Sali), who also worked at the exchange. He began to pursue her romantically. During this period of work and throughout his whole career, he used Elizabeth as a model for his photographs. Kertész also took numerous photographs of his brother Jenő. Kertész left his career at the exchange to try agricultural work and beekeeping during the early 1920s. This venture was brief given the political turmoil that accompanied the revolution and coming of communism.

After returning to the stock exchange, Kertész decided to emigrate, to study at one of France's photographic schools. His mother dissuaded him, and he did not emigrate for several years. Working during the day at the exchange, he pursued photography the rest of the time.

In 1923, the Hungarian Amateur Photographer's Association selected one of his photographs for its silver award, on the condition that he print it by the bromoil process. Kertész disliked this, so turned down the medal. Instead, he was given a diploma from the association. On its 26 June 1925, the Hungarian news magazine Érdekes Újság used one of his photographs for its cover, giving him widespread publicity. By that time, Kertész was determined to photograph the sights in Paris and join its artistic culture.

=== French period ===
Paris, Mondrian's Glasses and Pipe (1926), The Phillips Collection

Kertész emigrated to Paris in September 1925, leaving behind his mother, his unofficial fiancée Elizabeth, both brothers, and his uncle Hoffman, who died shortly afterward. Jenő later emigrated to Argentina. Elizabeth Kertész remained until her future husband was well enough established in Paris that they could marry. Kertész was among numerous Hungarian artists, including François Kollar, Robert Capa, Emeric Fehér, Brassaï, and Julia Bathory. Man Ray, Germaine Krull and Lucien Aigner, who also emigrated to Paris during this period.

Initially Kertész took on commissioned work for several European magazines, gaining publication of his work in Germany, France, Italy and Great Britain. Soon after arriving in Paris, Kertész changed his first name to André, which he kept for the rest of his life. In Paris he found critical and commercial success. In 1927 Kertész was the first photographer to have a one-man exhibition; Jan Slivinsky presented 30 of his photographs at the "Sacre du Printemps Gallery". Kertész had become connected with members of the growing Dada movement. Paul Dermée dubbed him "Brother Seer" and "Brother Seeing Eye" during his first solo exhibit, alluding to a medieval monastery where all the monks were blind bar one. Over the next years, Kertész was featured in both solo exhibits and group shows. In 1932 at the Julien Levy Gallery in New York, the price of Kertész's proofs was set at US$20 ($ 472 in 2025), a large sum of money during the Great Depression.

Kertész and other Hungarian artists formed a synergistic circle; he was featured in exhibits with some of them later in his life. Visiting his sculptor friends, he was fascinated by the Cubism movement. He created photo portraits of painters Piet Mondrian and Marc Chagall, the writer Colette, and film-maker Sergei Eisenstein. In 1928, Kertész switched from using plate-glass cameras to a Leica. This period of work was one of his most productive; he was photographing daily, with work divided between magazine commissions through the late 1920s and his personal pieces. In 1930, at the Exposition Coloniale in Paris, Kertész was awarded a silver medal for services to photography.

The Fork, or La Fourchette, was taken in 1928 and is one of Kertész's most famous works from this period.

Kertész was published in French magazines such as Vu and Art et Médecine, for which his work was used for numerous covers. His greatest journalistic collaboration was with Lucien Vogel, the French editor and publisher of Vu. Vogel published his work as photo essays, letting Kertész report on various subjects through images. The photographer was intrigued with the variety of topics assigned by Vogel.

In 1933 Kertész was commissioned for the series, Distortion, about 200 photographs of Najinskaya Verackhatz and Nadia Kasine, two models portrayed nude and in various poses, with their reflections caught in a combination of distortion mirrors, similar to a carnival's house of mirrors. In some photographs, only certain limbs or features were visible in the reflection. Some images also appeared in the 2 March issue of the "girly magazine" Le Sourire and in the 15 September 1933 issue of Arts et métiers graphiques. Later that year, Kertész published the book Distortions, a collection of the work.

In 1933 Kertész published his first personal book of photographs, Enfants, dedicated to his fiancée Elizabeth and his mother, who had died that year. He published regularly during the succeeding years. Paris (1934) was dedicated to his brothers Imre and Jenő. Nos Amies les bêtes ("Our Friends the Animals") was released in 1936 and Les Cathédrales du vin ("The Cathedrals of Wine") in 1937.

=== Marriage and family ===
In the late 1920s, Kertész secretly married the French portrait photographer Rosza Klein (she used the name Rogi André). The marriage was short-lived and he never spoke about it.

In 1930, he ventured back to Hungary to visit his family. After his return to Paris, Elizabeth followed him in 1931, despite opposition by her family. Elizabeth and André remained together for the rest of their lives. Despite his mother's death in early 1933, Kertész married Elizabeth on 17 June 1933. He was said to have spent less time with his artist friends in favor of his new wife.

In 1936 they emigrated to New York, where within a decade, they became naturalized citizens. After creating and running a successful cosmetic business for years, in 1977 Elizabeth died of cancer.

=== Pending war ===
Social and political tensions were rising in Europe with the growing strength in Germany of the Nazi Party. Many magazines emphasized stories about political topics and stopped publishing Kertész because of his apolitical subjects. With his commissioned work dropping and persecution of Jews increasing, Kertész and Elizabeth decided to move to New York - which may have saved his life, as four years later France would fall under Nazi occupation. He was offered work at the Keystone agency owned by Ernie Prince. In 1936, Kertész and Elizabeth boarded the SS Washington bound for Manhattan.

Distortion#49, one of the images in the Distortion series Kertész took during 1933

The couple arrived in New York on 15 October 1936, with Kertész intent on finding fame in America. They lived at the Beaux Arts Hotel in Greenwich Village. Kertész found life in America more difficult than he had imagined, beginning a period which he later referred to as the "absolute tragedy". Deprived of his artist friends, he also found that Americans rejected having their photos taken on the street. Soon after his arrival, Kertész approached Beaumont Newhall, director of the photographic department at the Museum of Modern Art (MoMA), who was preparing a show entitled Photography 1839–1937. Offering Newhall some of his Distortions photographs, Kertész bristled at his criticism, but Newhall did exhibit 5 of the photographs. In December 1937 Kertész had his first solo show in New York at the PM Gallery.

The Keystone agency, who had offered him offsite work, required him to stay in the company's studio. Kertész tried to return to France to visit, but had no money. By the time he had saved enough, World War II had begun and travel to France was nearly impossible. His struggles with English compounded his problems. Years after learning to speak French in Paris, it was difficult for him to learn another new language. The lack of fluent language added to his feeling like an outsider.

Frustrated, Kertész left Keystone after Prince left the company in 1937. He was commissioned by Harper's Bazaar for an article on the Saks Fifth Avenue department store in their April 1937 issue. The magazine continued to use him in further issues, and he also took commissions from Town and Country to supplement his income. Vogue invited the photographer to work for the magazine, but he declined, believing it was not appropriate work for him. He chose to work for Life magazine, starting with a piece called The Tugboat. Despite orders, he photographed more than just tugboats, including works on the entire harbor and its activities. Life refused to publish the unauthorized photographs. Kertész resented the constraints on his curiosity.

On 25 October 1938, Look printed a series of Kertész photographs, entitled A Fireman Goes to School; but credited them mistakenly to Ernie Prince, his former boss. Infuriated, Kertész considered never working with photo magazines again. His work was published in the magazine Coronet in 1937, but in 1939 he was excluded when the magazine published a special issue featuring its "Most memorable photographs". He later severed all ties to the magazine and its editor Arnold Gingrich. After being excluded from the June 1941 issue of Vogue, dedicated to photography, Kertész broke off relations with them. He had contributed to more than 30 commissioned photo essays and articles in both Vogue and House and Garden, but was omitted from the list of featured photographers.

In 1941, the Kertész couple were designated as enemy aliens because of World War II (Hungary was fighting on the side of the Axis powers). Kertész was not permitted to photograph outdoors or to have any project related to national security. Trying to avoid trouble because Elizabeth had started a cosmetics company (Cosmia Laboratories), Kertész ceased to do commissioned work and essentially disappeared from the photographic world for three years.

On 20 January 1944, Elizabeth became a US citizen; and Kertész was naturalized on 3 February. Despite competition from photographers such as Irving Penn, Kertész regained commissioned work. He was omitted from the list of 63 photographers which Vogue's identified as significant in its "photographic genealogical tree". But, House and Garden commissioned him to do photographs for a Christmas issue. In addition, in June 1944 László Moholy-Nagy, director of the New Bauhaus – American School of Design offered him a position teaching photography. Despite the honor, he turned the offer down.

In 1945, Kertész released a new book, Day of Paris, made up of photographs taken just before his emigration from France. It gained critical success. With his wife's cosmetic business booming, Kertész agreed in 1946 to a long-term, exclusive contract with House and Garden. Although it restricted his editorial freedom and required many hours in the studio, the pay of at least US$10,000 per annum ($ 165,000 per year in 2025) was satisfactory. All photographic negatives were returned to him within six months for his own use.

Kertész worked in the settings of many famous homes and notable places, as well as overseas, where he traveled again in England, Budapest and Paris, renewing friendships and making new ones. During the 1945–62 period at House and Garden, the magazine published more than 3,000 of his photographs, and he created a high reputation in the industry. With little time for his personal work, Kertész felt starved of being able to exercise more artistic creativity.

=== Later life ===
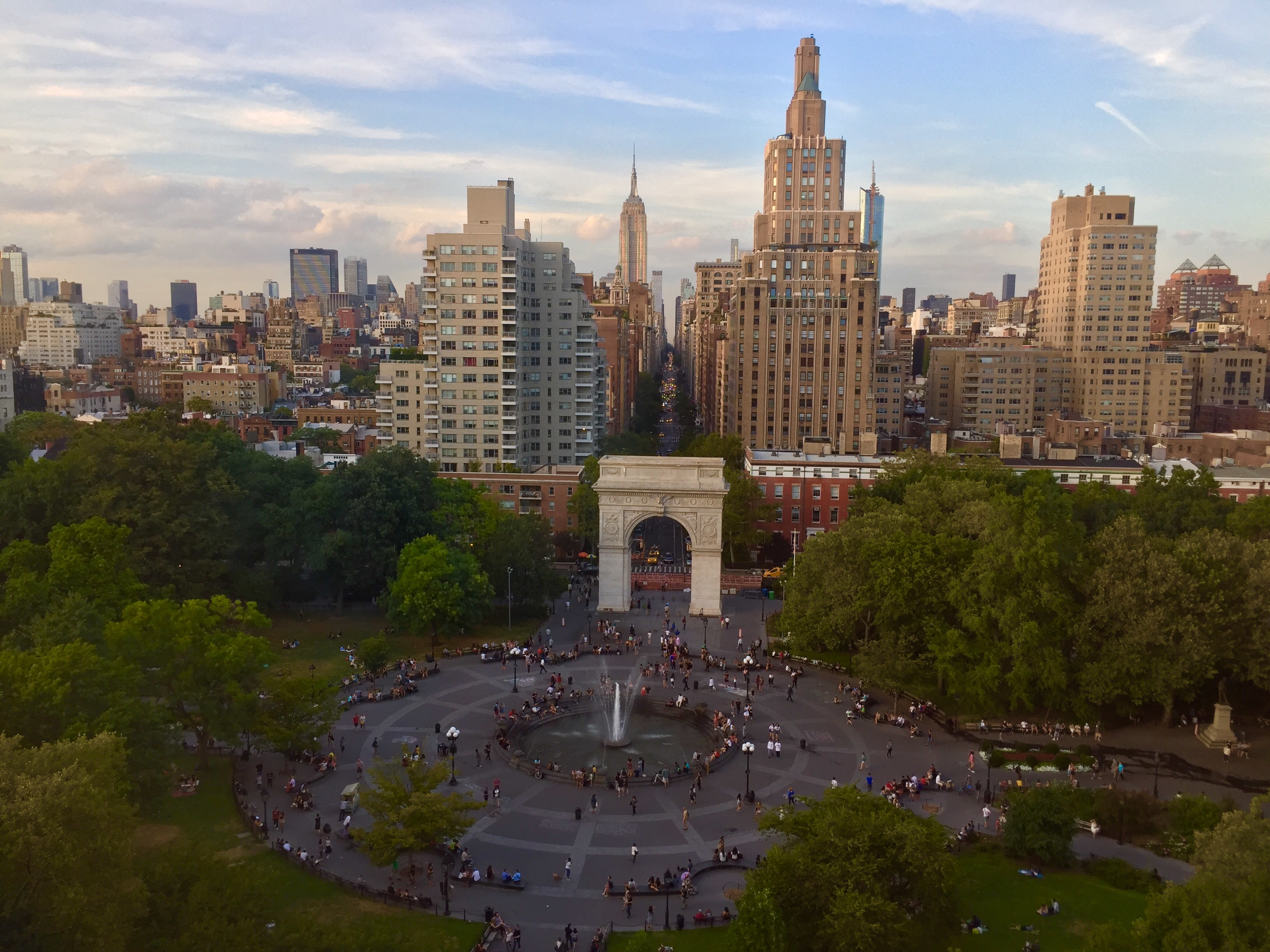
In 1952, Kertész moved into an apartment on the 12th floor of 2 Fifth Avenue (the high-rise building to the left of the Washington Square Arch). From his apartment, he took some of his best photographs of Washington Square Park and the Twin Towers of the World Trade Center.

In 1946, Kertész had a solo exhibition at the Art Institute of Chicago, featuring photographs from his Day of Paris series. Kertész said this was one of his greatest times in the United States. In 1952, he and his wife moved to a 12th-floor apartment at 2 Fifth Avenue near Washington Square Park, the setting for some of his best photographs since having immigrated to the US. Using a telephoto lens, he took a series of snow-covered Washington Square, showing numerous silhouettes and tracks. In 1955 he was insulted to have his work excluded when Edward Steichen's The Family of Man show was featured at MoMA. Despite the success of the Chicago show, Kertész did not gain another exhibit until 1962, when his photographs were shown at Long Island University.

Kertész lived at 2 Fifth Avenue during the construction and inauguration of the former World Trade Center. He photographed the Twin Towers from his apartment on multiple occasions prior to his death.

=== International period ===
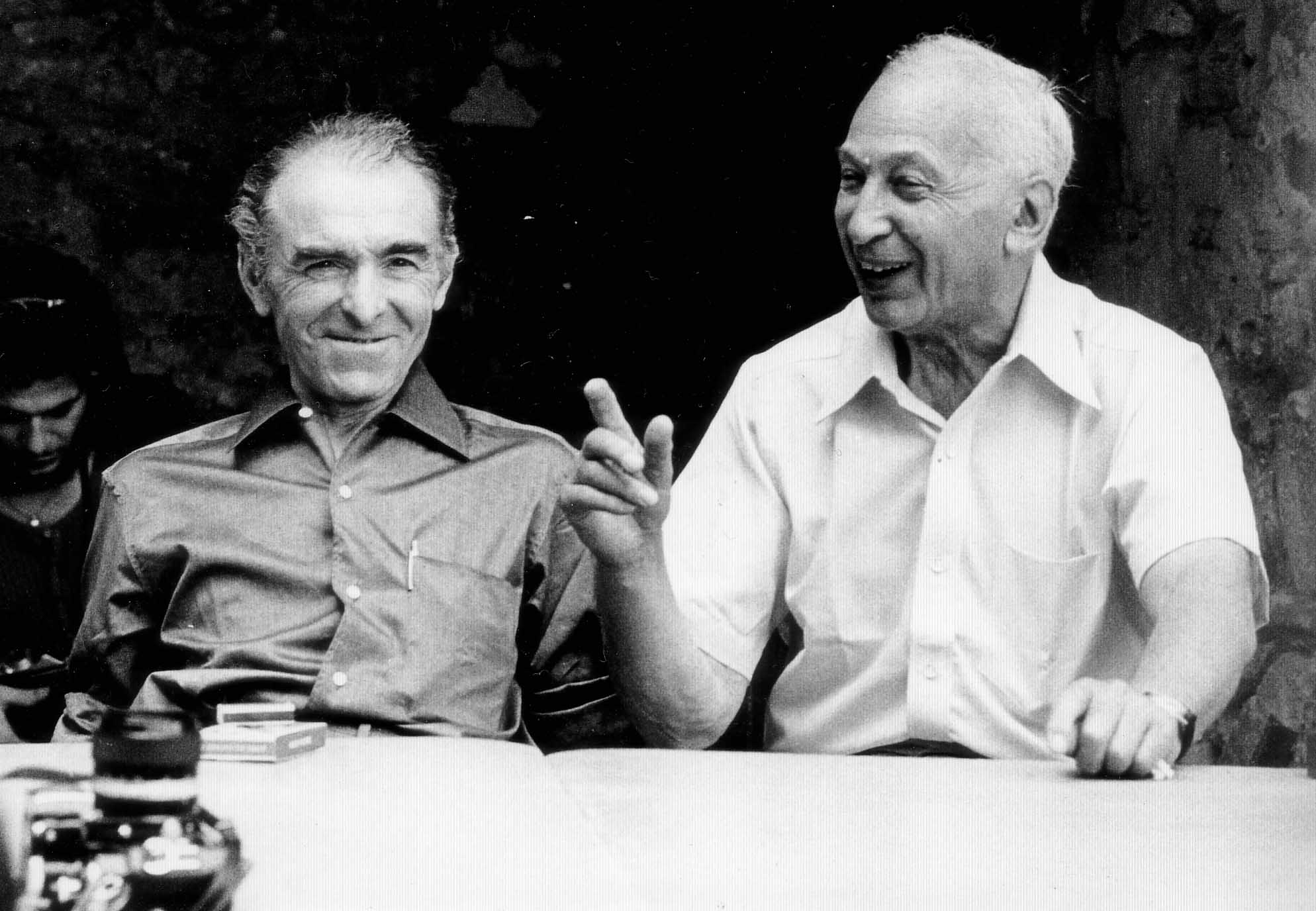
Kertész (right) and Robert Doisneau, at Arles, Southern France, in 1975

Toward the end of 1961, Kertész broke his contract to Condé Nast Publishing after a minor dispute, and started doing his own work again. This later period of his life is often referred to as the "International period", when he gained worldwide recognition and his photos were exhibited in many countries. In 1962 his work was exhibited in Venice; in 1963, he was one of the invited artists of the IV Mostra Biennale Internazionale della Fotografia there and he was awarded a gold medal for his dedication to the photographic industry. Later in 1963, his work was shown in Paris at the Bibliothèque nationale de France. He later visited Argentina to see his younger brother Jenő for the first time in years. Kertész experimented with color photographs, but only produced a few.

In 1964, soon after John Szarkowski became the photography director at the Museum of Modern Art, he featured Kertész in a solo show. With his work critically acclaimed, Kertész gained recognition in the photographic world as an important artist. The work of Kertész was featured in numerous exhibitions throughout the world in his later life, even into his early nineties. Due to his newfound success, in 1965 Kertész was appointed as a member of the American Society of Media Photographers.

His awards rapidly accumulated. In 1974 he received a Guggenheim Fellowship; in 1974 he was awarded Commander of the French Ordre des Arts et des Lettres; in 1977 he received the Mayor's Award of Honor for Arts and Culture in New York; in 1980 he received the Medal of the City of Paris, and the first Annual Award of the Association of International Photography Art Dealers in New York; and in 1981 he received an honorary Doctorate of Fine Arts from Bard College, and the New York Mayor's Award of Honor for Arts and Culture.

During this period, Kertész produced a number of new books. He was able to recover some of the negatives he had left in France decades before.

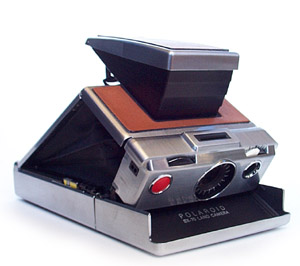
A SX-70 camera model similar to the one Kertész experimented with in the late 1970s and into the 1980s

Despite his successes, Kertész still felt unrecognised as a photographer. His last years were spent travelling to various locations around the globe for his exhibitions, especially Japan, and rekindling friendships with other artists. To deal with the loss of his wife in 1977, Kertész fell back on his new network of friends, often visiting them to talk. By this time, he was said to have learned basic English and talked in what his friends called "Kertészian", a mixture of Hungarian, English and French.

In 1979, the Polaroid Corporation gave him one of their new SX-70 cameras, which he experimented with into the 1980s. Still growing in fame, Kertész was granted the National Grand Prize of Photography in Paris in 1982, as well as the 21st Annual George Washington Award from the American Hungarian Foundation the same year.

In 1980, Kertész sat for Canadian artist Arnaud Maggs, resulting in the large-scale portrait project André Kertész, 144 Views (1980). According to Maggs, Kertész described the work as a "portrait mosaic."

== Death ==
Kertész died in his sleep at home on 28 September 1985; he was cremated and his ashes were interred with those of his wife.

== Legacy and honors ==
- 1983: honorary doctorate from the Royal College of Art; and title of Chevalier de la Legion of Honour in Paris: together with an apartment for future visits to the city;
- 1984: the Maine Photographic Workshop's first Annual Lifetime Achievement Award;
- 1984: purchase of 100 prints by the Metropolitan Museum of Art, its largest acquisition of work from a living artist;
- 1985: Californian Distinguished Career in Photography Award;
- 1985: first Annual Master of Photography Award, presented by the International Center of Photography; and
- 1985: honorary doctorate from Parson's School of Design of the New School for Social Research.
- 1986: Kertész is posthumously inducted into the International Photography Hall of Fame and Museum.
- 2002: a New York City photograph by Kertész appeared on a 37-cent U.S. postage stamp, part of a Masters of American Photography series.
- 2025: An opera based on the life of Kertész, "Click!", was premiered at the Eastman Opera Theater in Rochester, NY. The music was composed by Steven Bramson, the libretto by Gayle Hudson.

== Critical evaluation ==
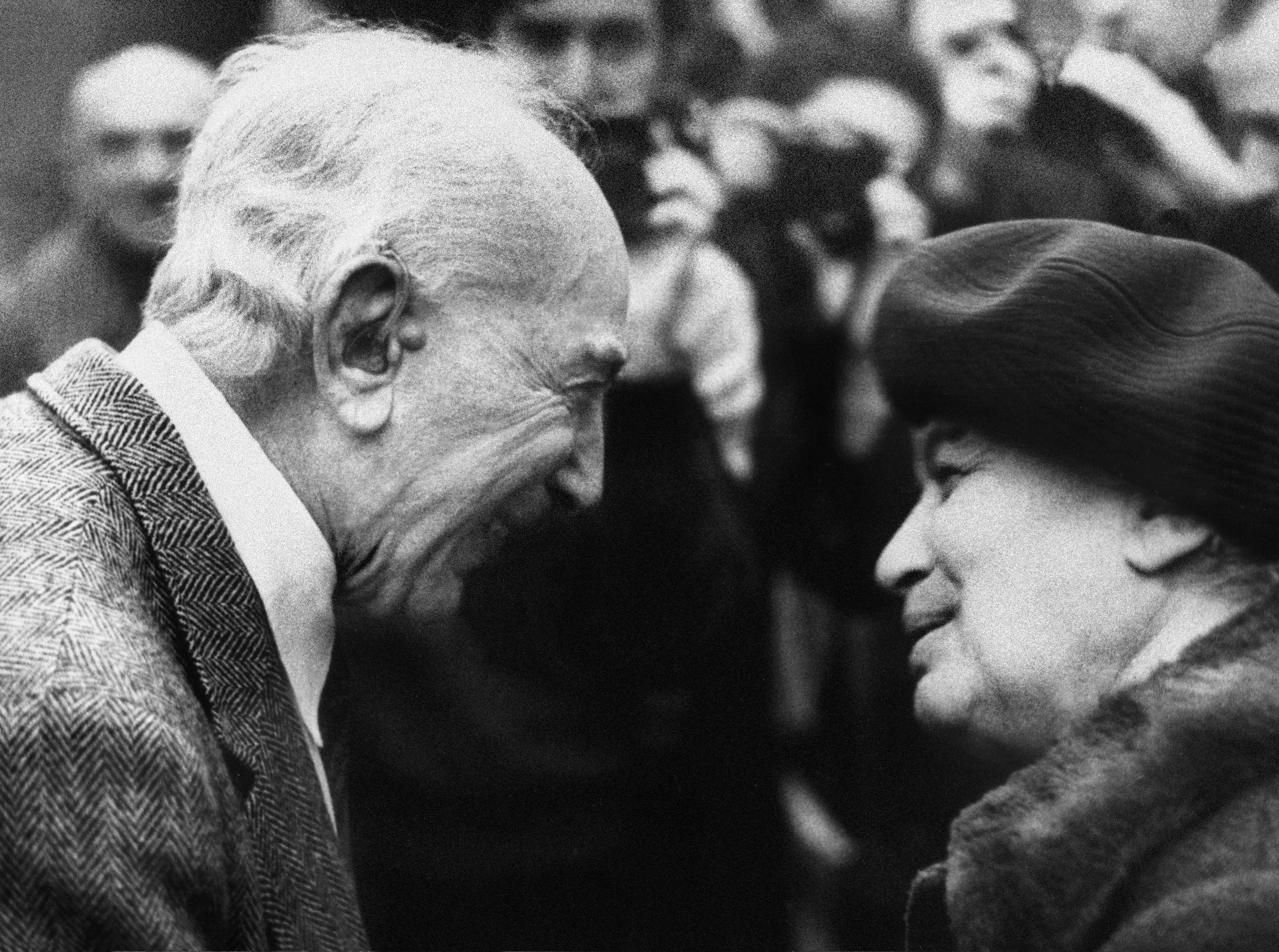
Kertész meeting with a close acquaintance at an exhibition in Budapest, c. 1984

Throughout most of his career Kertész was depicted as the "unknown soldier" who worked behind the scenes of photography, yet was rarely cited for his work, even up to his death in 1985. Kertész thought himself unrecognised throughout his life, despite spending his life in the eternal search for acceptance and fame. Though Kertész received numerous awards for photography, he never felt both his style and work was accepted by critics and art audiences alike. Although, in 1927, he was the first photographer to have a solo exhibition, Kertész said that it was not until his 1946 exhibition at the Art Institute of Chicago, that he first felt he received positive reviews on his work, and often cites this show as one of his finest moments in America. During his stay in America, he was cited as being an intimate artist, bringing the viewer into his work, even when the picture was that of subjects such as the intimidating New York City and even his reproduced work printed after his death received good reviews; "Kertész was above all a consistently fine photographer". Kertész's work itself is often described as predominantly utilising light and even Kertész himself said that "I write with light". He was never considered to "comment" on his subjects, but rather capture them – this is often cited as why his work is often overlooked; he stuck to no political agenda and offered no deeper thought to his photographs other than the simplicity of life. With his art's intimate feeling and nostalgic tone, Kertész's images alluded to a sense of timelessness which was inevitably only recognised after his death. Unlike other photographers, Kertész's work gave an insight into his life, showing a chronological order of where he spent his time; for example, many of his French photographs were from cafés where he spent the majority of his time waiting for artistic inspiration.

Although Kertész rarely received bad reviews, it was the lack of commentary that led to the photographer feeling distant from recognition. Now, however, he is often considered to be the father of photojournalism. Even other photographers cite Kertész and his photographs as being inspirational; Henri Cartier-Bresson once said of him in the early 1930s, "We all owe him a great deal." When he was 90 years old, a person asked him why he was still taking photographs. He replied, "I'm still hungry."

== Publications ==
This list is compiled from Capa et al., Corkin & Lifson and Könemann et al..

- 1933: Enfants published in Paris by Éditions d'Histoire et d'Art. A compilation of 54 photographs dedicated to his mother and his wife Elizabeth.
- 1934: Paris Vu Par André Kertész published in Paris by Éditions d'Histoire et d'Art. A compilation of 48 photographs from Kertész's time in Paris.
- 1936: Nos Amies les Bêtes published in Paris by Éditions d'Histoire et d'Art. A compilation of 60 photographs of various animals and is dedicated to Szigetbecse, where he took his earliest photographs.
- 1937: Les Cathédrales du Vin published in Paris by Etablissements et Brice. A compilation of 28 photographs.
- 1945: Day of Paris published in New York by J.J. Augustin. A compilation of 126 photographs, again of photographs during his stay in Paris.
- 1964: André Kertész, Photographer published in New York by the Museum of Modern Art. A compilation of 64 photographs from his exhibition that same year at the MoMA.
- 1966: André Kertész published in New York by Paragraphic Books. A compilation of 76 reproduced photographs.
- 1968: The Concerned Photographer published in New York by Grossman Publishers following "The Concerned Photographer" exhibition.
- 1971: On Reading published in New York by Grossman Publishers. A small number of photographs all of various people reading.
- 1972: André Kertész: Sixty Years of Photography, 1912–1972 published in New York by Grossman Publishers. A compilation of 250 photographs.
- 1974: J'aime Paris: Photographs Since the Twenties published in New York by Grossman Publishers. A compilation of 219 photographs from his years in Paris and his later return trips there.
- 1975: Washington Square published in New York by Grossman Publishers. A compilation of 104 photographs of Washington Square which Kertész took using a telephoto lens.
- 1976: Distortions published in New York by Alfred A. Knopf. A compilation of 200 photographs featuring two naked models distorted in a funhouse mirror. These photographs were taken many years prior to the book's release.
- 1976: Of New York published in New York by Alfred A. Knopf. A compilation of 184 photographs taken of New York and is dedicated to Elizabeth.
- 1977: André Kertész published in New York by Aperture Inc. A compilation of 44 photographs as part of the History of Photography series by Aperture Inc.
- 1979: Americana published in New York by Mayflower Books Inc. A compilation of 64 photographs from throughout Kertész's career. The photos depict American ways of life and the book is one of four in a series. The other four books, Birds, Landscapes and Portraits, were released the same year, but Kertész thought the photograph reproductions in the books were terrible and, for the first time, refused to autograph books.
- 1979: Birds published in New York by Mayflower Books Inc. A compilation of 64 photographs depicting bird life from throughout Kertész's career.
- 1979: Landscapes published in New York by Mayflower Books Inc. A compilation of 64 photographs featuring landscapes from throughout Kertész's career.
- 1979: Portraits published in New York by Mayflower Books Inc. A compilation of 64 portraiture photographs from throughout Kertész's career.
- 1981: From My Window published in Boston by New York Graphic Society/Little Brown. A compilation of 53 colour photographs, one of the rare times Kertész used colour film.
- 1982: André Kertész: A Lifetime of Perception published in Canada by Prentice-Hall Canada Inc.
- 2004: André Kertész published in Lawrenceville by Princeton University Press.
- 2004: André Kertész et la Savoie published in Haute-Savoie by Fontaine de Siloe.
- 2005: "André Kertész" produced by The National Gallery of Art, published in Washington DC by Princeton University Press
- 2005: André Kertész: Observations, Thoughts, Reflections published in Chicago by Stephen Daiter Gallery.
- 2005: The Early Years published in New York by W. W. Norton & Company.
- 2007: The Polaroids published in New York by W. W. Norton & Company.
- 2008: Photofile: André Kertész published in London by Thames & Hudson.
- 2024: "American, born Hungary: Kertész, Capa, and the Hungarian American Photographic Legacy" published in Virginia by Yale University Press.

== Exhibitions ==
This list includes material from Capa et al, Corkin & Lifson, Könemann et al, and Naef et al.

- 1927: Untitled exhibition of thirty photographs at Au Sacre du Printemps Gallery, Paris. The first one-man photographer exhibition ever.
- 1927: III Salon International de Fotografie in Zaragoza.
- 1927: XXIIIe Salon International de Fotografie in Paris.
- 1928: 1er Salon Indépendant de la Photographie at the Théâtre des Champs-Élysées, Paris.
- 1928: Exposition de Photographie at Galerie L'Epoque, Brussels.
- 1928: Internationale Foto-Salon in Rotterdam.
- 1929: Svaz cs. Klubu Fotografu Amateru in Prague.
- 1929: Fotografie der Gegenwart in Essen.
- 1929: Der International Ausstellung von Film and Foto in Stuttgart.
- 1930: Das Lichtbild, a travelling show, in Essen and Munich.
- 1930: Primer Salon Annual de Fotografia in Buenos Aires.
- 1930: 11e Salon de l'Araignée at the G.L. Manuel Freres Gallery, Paris.
- 1930: Photographies d'aujourd'hui at d'Art Contemporain Gallery, Paris.
- 1931: Deuxieme Groupe de Photographes at d'Art Contemporain Gallery, Paris.
- 1931: Association Belge de Photographie at the Xe Salon de Photographie, Brussels.
- 1931: Photographies d'aujourd'hui at d'Art Contemporain Gallery, Paris.
- 1931: Neue Sportbauten at Graphische Lehr-und Versuchsanstaldt, Vienna.
- 1931: An Exhibition of Foreign Photography at The Art Center, New York City.
- 1932: Palais des Beaux-Arts at Internationale de la Photographie, Brussels.
- 1932: Modern European Photography at the Julien Levy Gallery, New York.
- 1932: International Photographers" at the Brooklyn Museum, New York.
- 1932: Modern Photography at the Albright Art Gallery, Buffalo, New York.
- 1932: Untitled exhibition at the Museum Fokwang, Essen.
- 1933: Deuxieme Exposition Internationale de la Photographie et Cinema in Brussels.
- 1933: Groupe Annuel des Photographes at the Galerie de la Pléiade, Paris.
- 1933: The Modern Spirit in Photography at The Royal Photographic Society of Great Britain, London.
- 1934: Untitled exhibition at Leleu's Studio, Paris.
- 1934: Groupe Annuel des Photographes at the Galerie de la Pléiade, Paris.
- 1934: Exposition de la société des artistes photographes at Studio Saint-Jacques, Paris.
- 1934: The Modern Spirit in Photography and Advertising at The Royal Photographic Society of Great Britain, London.
- 1935: Untitled exhibition at the Galerie de la Pléiade, Paris.
- 1936: Exposition Internationale de la Photographie Contemporaine at Musée des Arts Décoratifs, Paris.
- 1937: Photography 1839–1937 at the Museum of Modern Art, New York.
- 1937: Untitled exhibition at the P M Gallery, New York.
- 1937: Pioneers of Modern French Photography at the Julien Levy Gallery, New York.
- 1942: Image of Freedom at the Museum of Modern Art, New York.
- 1946: Untitled exhibition at the Art Institute of Chicago, Chicago. This was Kertész's first solo museum exhibition in America and he often cited this as one of his finest moments while in America.
- 1963: Untitled exhibition at Modernage Photo Lab, New York.
- 1963: IV Mostra Biennale Internazionale della Fotografia, at the Museo Correr – Napoleonic Wing, Venice
- 1963: André Kertész at the Bibliothèque Nationale, Paris.
- 1964: André Kertész, Photographer at the Museum of Modern Art, New York.
- 1967: All Art Is For Life & Against the War in Vietnam at the Terrain Gallery, New York.
- 1967: The Concerned Photographer at the Riverside Museum, New York. This later travelled across the globe, including Tokyo.
- 1970: Expo '70 at the U.S. Pavilion, Osaka.
- 1971: Untitled solo exhibition at the Hungarian National Gallery, Budapest.
- 1971: Untitled solo exhibition at Moderna Museet, Stockholm.
- 1972: Untitled solo exhibition at Valokuvamuseon, Helsinki.
- 1977: André Kertész at the Musée National d'Art Moderne in Centre Georges Pompidou, Paris.
- 1978: André Kertész at The Silver Image Gallery, Seattle (Poster published)
- 1979: André Kertész at the Serpentine Gallery, London.
- 1980: Is Beauty the Making One of Opposites?-Photography at the Terrain Gallery, New York.
- 1981: La Hongie d'aujourd'hui at Les Rencontres de la photographie, Arles, France.
- 1982: André Kertész, Master of Photography at the Chrysler Museum, Virginia.
- 1985: André Kertész: Of Paris and New York at the Art Institute of Chicago, Chicago.
- 1985: Untitled exhibition at Printemps, Tokyo.
- 1985: "Kertész". Ernesto Mayans Galleries. Santa Fe, New Mexico.
- 1987: Theodore Fried & André Kertész: An Enduring Friendship. H V Allison Galleries, New York.
- 1988: "Kertész. Vintage and Modern Prints." Ernesto Mayans Galleries. Santa Fe, New Mexico.
- 1989: "Kertész, Paris." Ernesto Mayans Galleries. Santa Fe, New Mexico.
- 2003: André Kertész: The New York Period 1936-1985 at Bruce Silverstein Gallery, New York.
- 2004: André Kertész at Jackson Fine Art, Atlanta, GA.
- 2005: The Early Years at Bruce Silverstein Gallery, New York.
- 2005: André Kertész at the National Gallery of Art, Washington, D.C.
- 2007: The Polaroids at Bruce Silverstein Gallery, New York.
- 2007: André Kertész: Seven Decades at the Getty Center, Los Angeles, CA.
- 2009: André Kertész: On Reading at The Photographers' Gallery, London.
- 2009: André Kertész: In the Depths of Winter at Bruce Silverstein Gallery, New York.
- 2009: Twilight Visions: Surrealism, Photography and Paris at Frist Center for the Visual Arts, Nashville, Tennessee.
- 2010: André Kertész at Jeu de Paume, Paris.
- 2010: Discoveries at Bruce Silverstein Gallery, New York.
- 2010: Re-Collection: Works from the collection of the Colorado Photographic Arts Center at the Denver Public Library, Denver, CO.
- 2010: André Kertész: On Reading at Carnegie Museum of Art, Pittsburgh, PA.
- 2010: An Intuitive Eye: André Kertész Photographs 1914-1969 at The Detroit Institute of Arts, Detroit, MI.
- 2010: CITY VIEWS: André Kertész, Curated by Michael Wolf, Bruce Silverstein Gallery, New York.
- 2011: Eyewitness: Hungarian Photography in the 20th Century at Royal Academy of Arts, London.
- 2011: "André Kertész Fotografías" at Fundación Carlos de Amberes, Madrid.
- 2011: "André Kertész Retrospektív" at Hungarian National Museum, Budapest.
- 2011: "André Kertész: Shadow Marks" at Winnipeg Art Gallery, Winnipeg.
- 2012: "André Kertész: Capturing Paris and New York" at University of Virginia Law Library, Charlottesville, VA.
- 2021-22: "André Kertész: Postcards from Paris" at Art Institute of Chicago, Chicago, IL.
- 2022: "André Kertész: Postcards from Paris" at The High Museum of Art, Atlanta, GA.
- 2025: "American, born Hungary: Kertész, Capa, and the Hungarian American Photographic Legacy" at Eastman Museum, Rochester, NY.

== See also ==
- Kertész (crater), named after him
