= Zilzer =

Zilzer is a surname. Notable people with the surname include:

- Anton Zilzer (1860–1921), Hungarian painter
- Max Zilzer (1868–1943), Hungarian-born German actor
- Wolfgang Zilzer (1901–1991), German-American actor, son of Max

== See also ==
- Ziller (surname)
