= Hans-Peter Mayer =

German politician (born 1944)

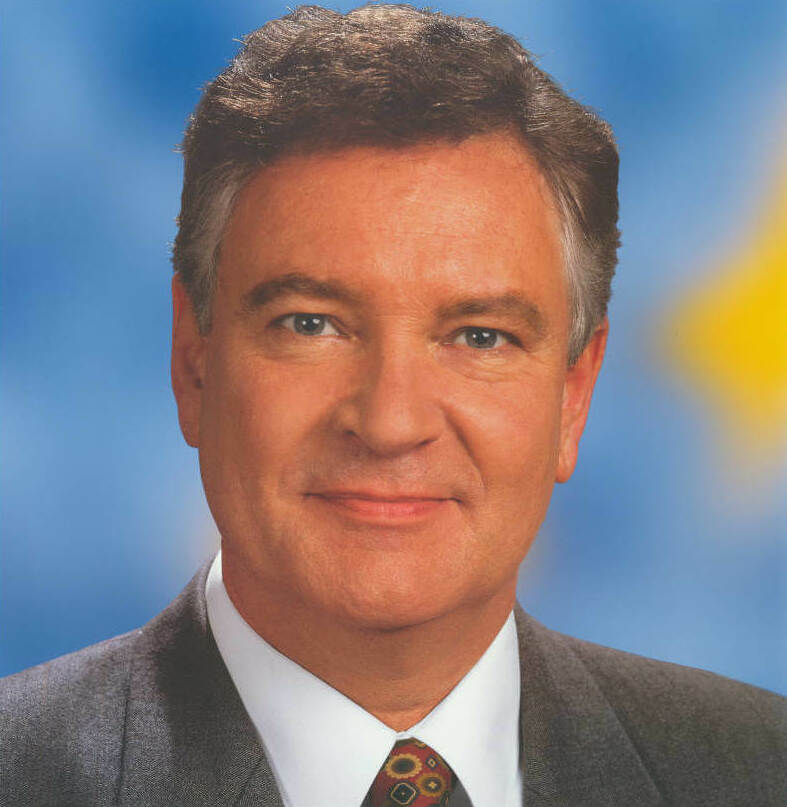
Hans Peter Mayer in 1999

Hans-Peter Mayer (born 5 May 1944, in Riedlingen) is a German politician who served as a Member of the European Parliament for Lower Saxony from 1999 until 2014. He is a member of the conservative Christian Democratic Union, part of the European People's Party.

During his time in parliament, Mayer sat on the European Parliament's Committee on Legal Affairs and was a member of the ACP-EU Joint Parliamentary Assembly. He was also a substitute for the Committee on Agriculture and Rural Development and the Delegation to the EU-Former Yugoslav Republic of Macedonia Joint Parliamentary Committee.

== Education ==
- 1975: Second state law examination
- Dr.jur
- 1975: utr
- 1990: PhD

== Career ==
- since 1975: lawyer
- 1980-1990: professor of law and administration
- 1990-1991: rector of the Catholic Vocational College of North Germany
- 1991-1994: under-secretary in the Ministry of Economic Affairs and Technology, Saxony-Anhalt
- 1975-1980: municipal councillor in Bad Waldsee
- 1984-1991: chairman of Vechta district of Europa Union
- 1995-1999: land chairman of the economic council of the CDU of Saxony-Anhalt and the Federal Commission on European policy
- since 1995: chairman of the land specialist committee of the CDU of Oldenburg on development of the Weser-Ems region.
- 1999-2014: Member of the European Parliament

== See also ==
- 2004 European Parliament election in Germany
