= Kertész (crater) =

Crater on Mercury

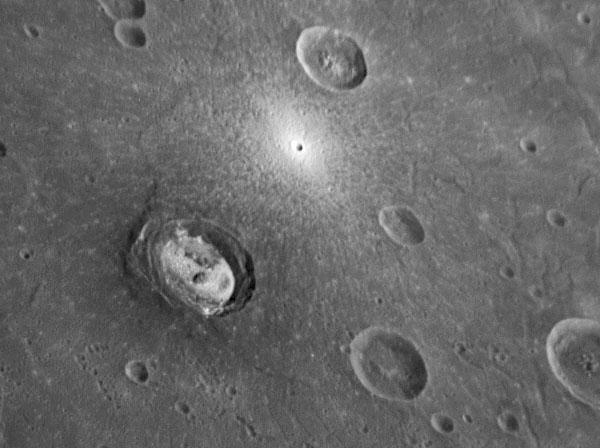
- Kertész is the big crater with bright floor and dark halo.
- Feature type: Impact crater
- Location: Raditladi quadrangle, Mercury
- Coordinates: 27.36°N 213.89°W
- Diameter: 32 km
- Eponym: André Kertész

Located in the western edge of Mercury's giant Caloris basin, Kertész crater (named in 2008 for André Kertész, a Hungarian-born American photographer) has some unusual, bright material located on its floor. Sander crater, located in the northwestern edge of Caloris basin, also shows bright material on its floor. Just northeast of Kertész a small crater has very bright rays and ejecta, indicating that the crater is young.

== Hollows ==
Hollows cover the entire crater floor, parts of the central peaks, and the southern rim slope.

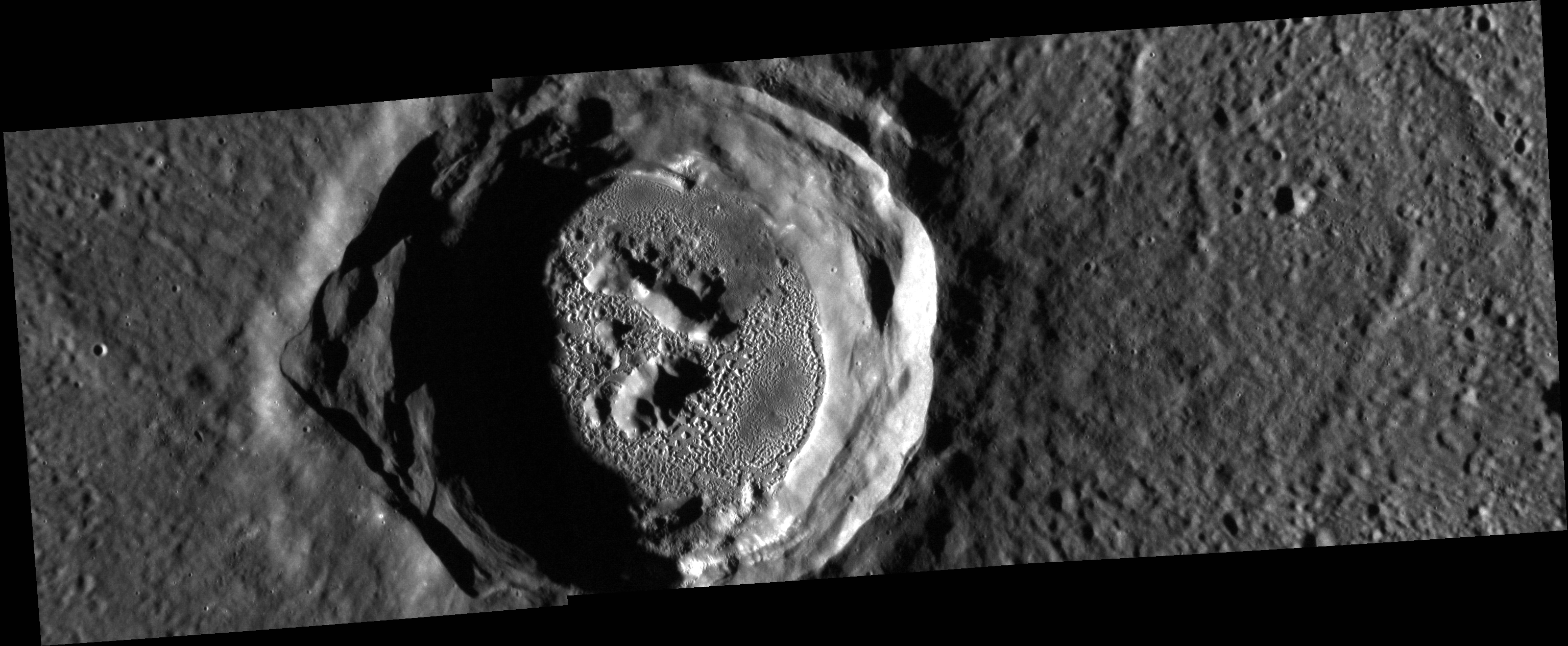
High-resolution mosaic

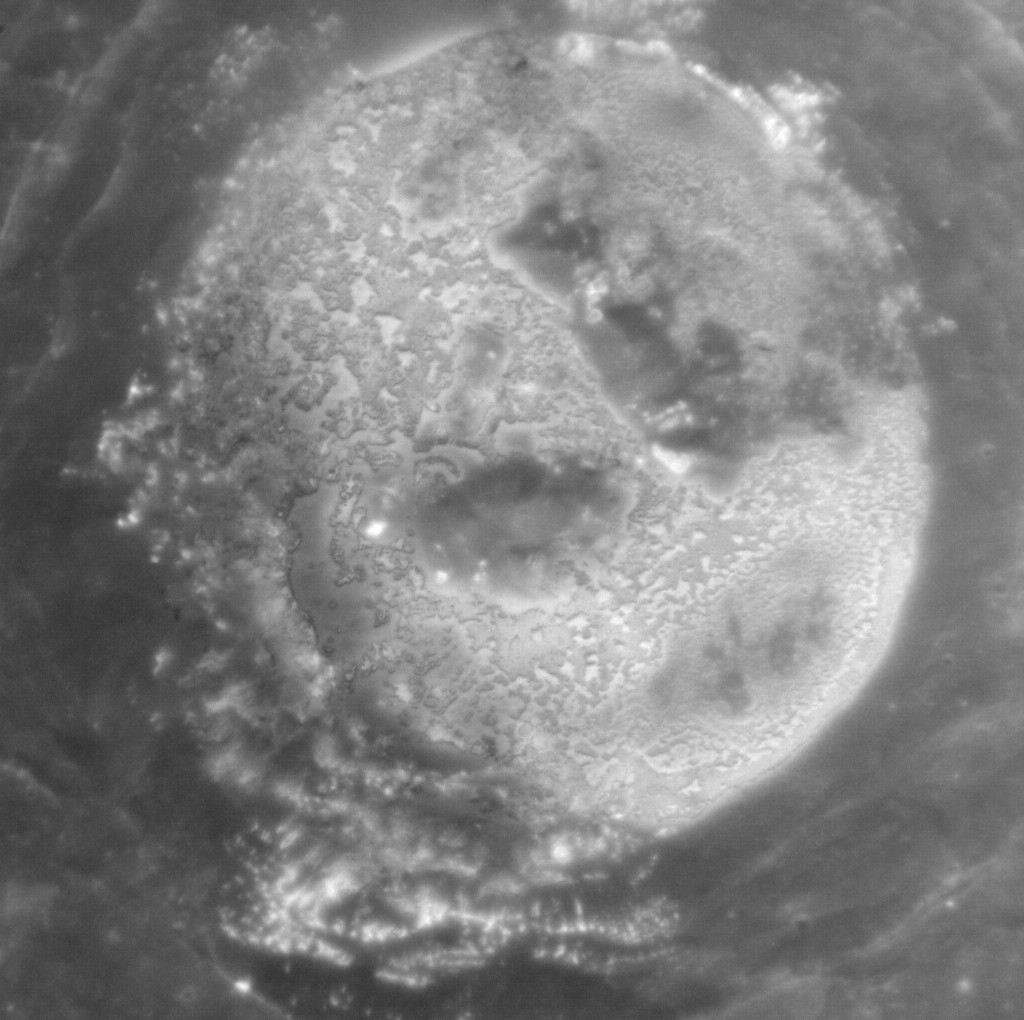
The hollows cover the crater floor

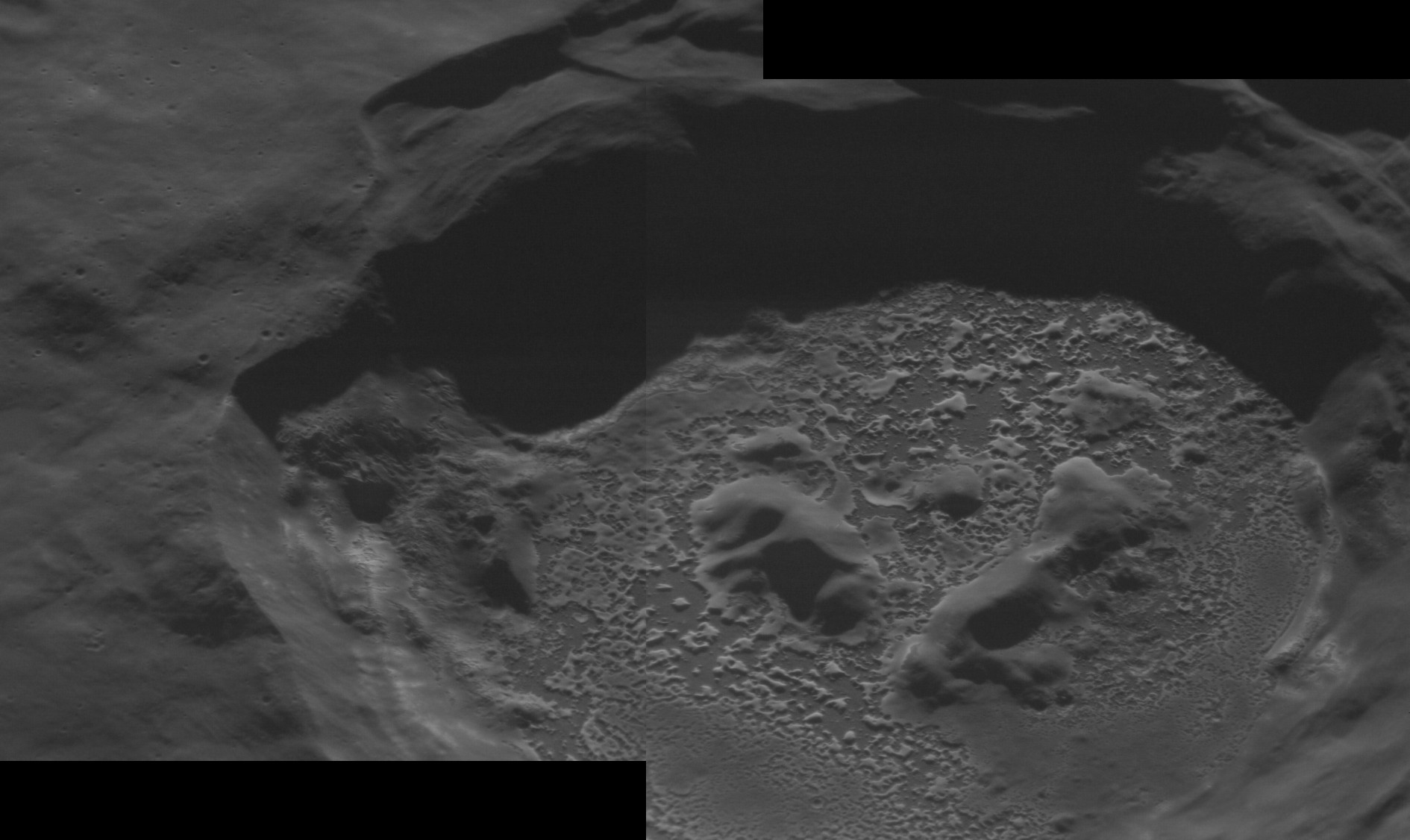
Another detail of the hollows
