= Raup =

Raup may refer to one of several people:

- David M. Raup (1933–2015), American paleontologist at the University of Chicago
  - Asteroid 9165 Raup, named after the paleontologist
- Hugh M. Raup (1901–1995), American botanist, ecologist and geographer
- Robert Bruce Raup (1888–1976), American Professor of Education at the Columbia University

== See also ==
- Surname Raupp
