= Riedlingen =

- Town
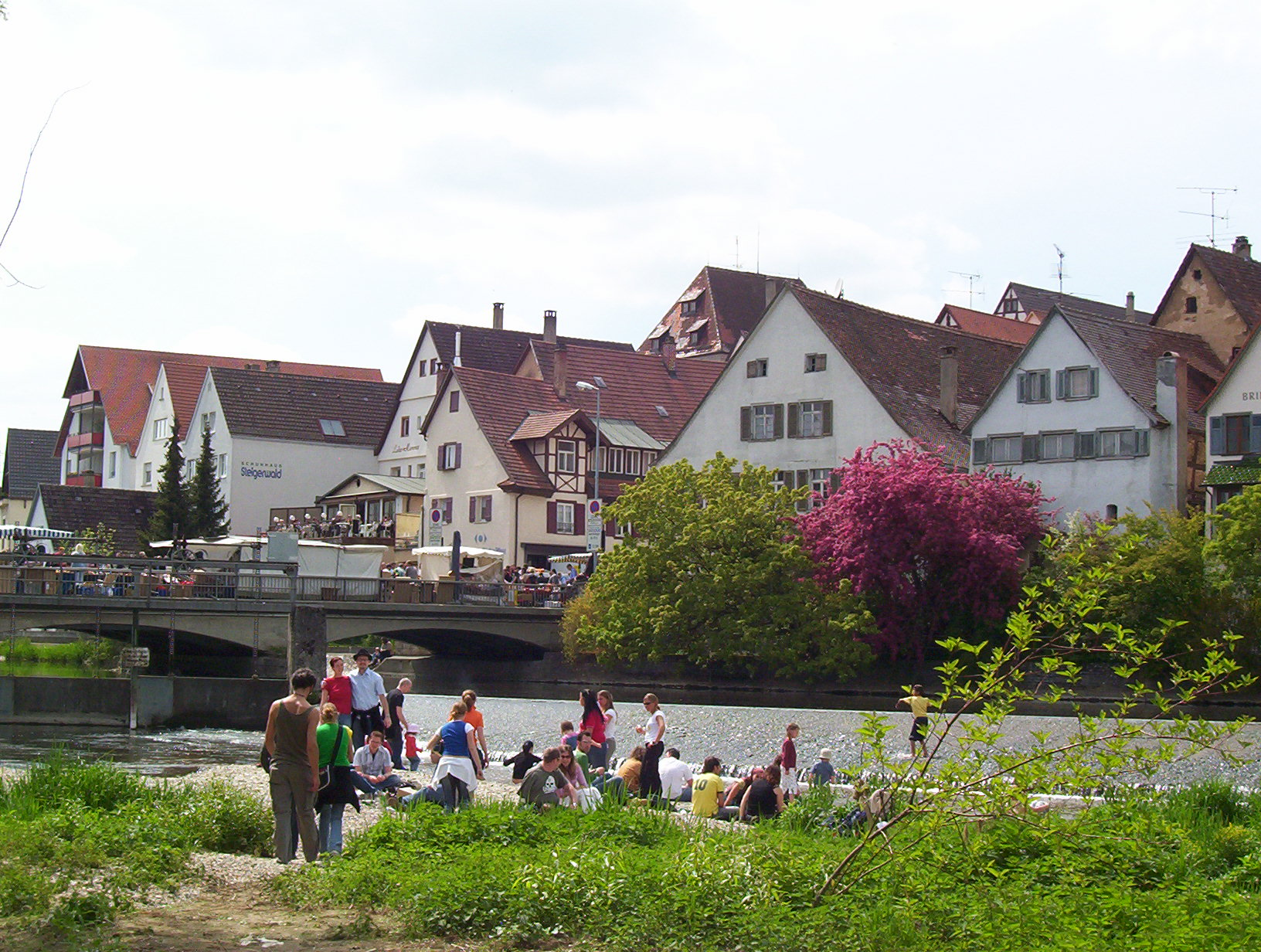

- Coat of arms

- Location of Riedlingen within Biberach district
- Interactive map of Riedlingen
- Location within Germany Location within Baden-Württemberg
- Coordinates: 48°9′19″N 9°28′22″E
- Country: Germany
- State: Baden-Württemberg
- Admin. region: Tübingen
- District: Biberach
- Subdivisions: 7

Government
  - Mayor (2021–29): Marcus Schafft

Area
  - Total: 64.95 km^{2} (25.08 sq mi)
- Elevation: 540 m (1,770 ft)

Population (2025-12-31)
  - Total: 11,122
  - Density: 171.2/km^{2} (443.5/sq mi)
- Time zone: UTC+01:00 (CET)
  - Summer (DST): UTC+02:00 (CEST)
- Postal codes: 88499
- Dialling codes: 07371
- Vehicle registration: BC
- Website: www.riedlingen.de

Riedlingen (German pronunciation: [ˈʁiːtlɪŋən]) is a town in the district (Kreis) of Biberach, Baden-Württemberg, in the south-west of Germany. It is one of the destinations of the Upper Swabian Baroque Route. Riedlingen has approximately 11,000 inhabitants.

== Geography ==
The town is situated on the river Danube. Furthermore, there it lies in a dale which is created by the extensions of the Swabian Alps. Around Riedlingen there are seven villages which are part of the urban district. These are called Neufra, Daugendorf, Grüningen, Pflummern, Zwiefaltendorf, Zell and Bechingen.

== History ==
Riedlingen is probably an Alemannic foundation. The first written reference dates back to 835. The medieval city was built 1247–1255, situated east of the hamlet of the Earl of Veringen. It was a typical town with its foundations kept in rectangular and square roads with the marketplace as the centre.

Even in the late 13th century the city was in possession of the Habsburgs, but which they pledged later. In 1314 the city belonged to the Counts of Hohenberg, later to the lords of Ellerbach 1384 and finally to the Steward of Waldburg [2]. The Reformation in the 16th century initially found strong support by the urban population. However, it could not prevail against the Catholic Church's Counter Reformation. From 1654 to 1658 Riedlingen a Capuchin monastery was built. In 1680 the city was claimed by Austria.

== Culture ==
Riedlingen is part of the Uperswabian Barockstraße, the Deutsche Fachwerkstraße and station at the EV6 River Road (Donauradweg).

The town hall dates back to 1447 and was first build as shopping centre.

In Riedlingen there are many sports clubs, such as the football club TSV Riedlingen which plays in the German "Kreisliga A". The carnival group called "Gole" has many followers. In the town centre there are several bakeries, cafes, and a cinema which acts as a theatre, stage and cafe within the same building.

Riedlingen has several churches: Protestant Christ Church and Protestant Church Pflumern, Roman Catholic Church Sankt Georg, Kuba Mosque, New Apostolic Church and Free Evangelic Church Riedlingen (Evangelische Freikirche Riedlingen).

The “Evangelische Freikirche Riedlingen” and its preacher Jakob Tscharntke get nationwide known, because he is spreading extremist conspiracy ideologies, ridiculed politicians and demonized them. The Baden-Württemberg Office for the Protection of the Constitution has been monitoring the congregation since 2022.

The writer Ernst Jünger used to live close to Riedlingen in the Jünger-Haus Wilflingen.

== Economy ==
The main employers in Riedlingen are the metalworking companies "Silit" and " Texmo Blank".

== Transportation ==
Train transportation is served by the Ulm–Sigmaringen railway.

== Notable people ==
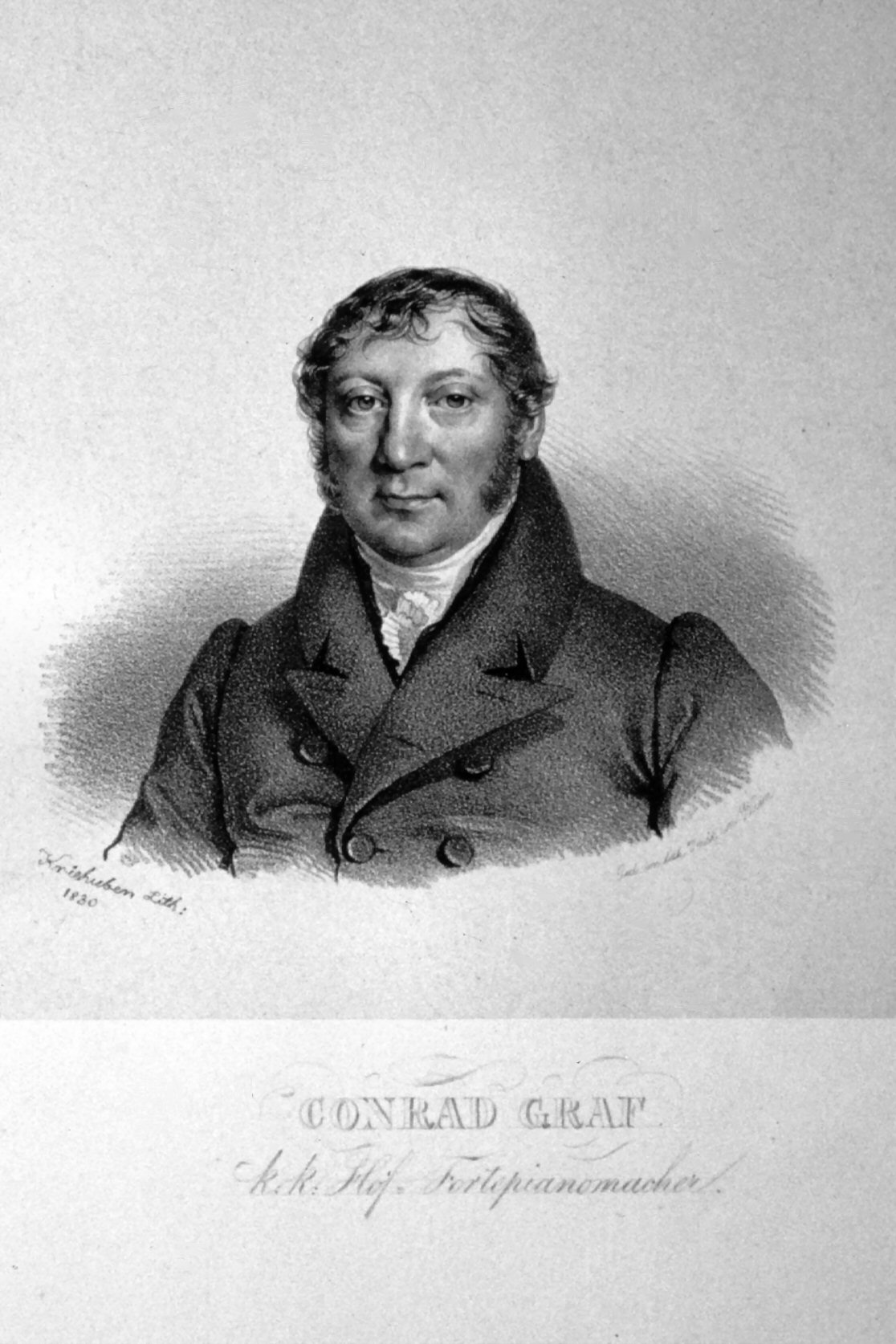
Conrad Graf, lithograph from 1830

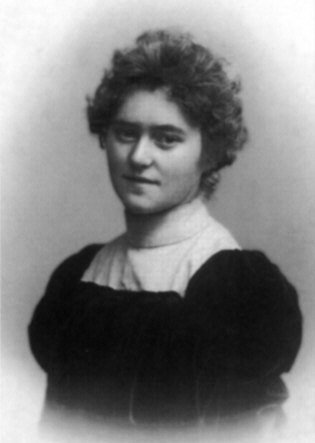
Maria Caspar-Filser, ca.1900

- Andreas von Jerin, (DE Wiki) (1541–1596), Bishop of Breslau
- Johann Joseph Christian (1706–1777), a German Baroque sculptor and woodcarver of choir stalls
- Conrad Graf (1782–1851), piano maker
- Johann Adam Möhler (1796–1838), Roman Catholic theologian and priest, curate at Riedlingen, 1819.
- Frederick Miller (1824–1888), founder of the American brewery Miller Brewing Company in Milwaukee
- Adolf Gröber, (DE Wiki) (1854–1919), politician, leader of the Centre Party in the Reichstag
- Gustav Merk, (DE Wiki) (1874–1954), Catholic priest and archivist
- Maria Caspar-Filser (1878–1968), painter, painted flowers, gardens and landscapes
- Willy Mißmahl, (DE Wiki) (1885–1964), surgeon
- Wilhelm Bröckel, (DE Wiki) (1887–1957), bank and association director
- Josef Keller, (DE Wiki) (1887–1981), confectioner, claimed to be one of the inventors of the Black Forest gateau
- Emil Münch, (DE Wiki) (1891–1961), local politician, District Chief Executive in Tettnang (1947–1957)
- Ernst Jünger (1895–1998), writer, philosopher, officer and entomologist; died in the district hospital Riedlingen
- Richard Lohrmann, (DE Wiki) (1896–1970), forester and conservationists, led the Forestry Office Riedlingen, 1946 to 1961
- Albert Burkart, (DE Wiki) (1898–1982), artist
- Ludwig Walz, (DE Wiki) (1898–1989), mayor and Righteous Among the Nations, died locally
- Franz Freiherr von Bodman (1908–1945), Obersturmführer and camp doctor in several concentration camps
- Hans-Peter Mißmahl, (DE Wiki) (1920–2008), internist
- Helmut Schlegel OFM (born 1943), Franciscan priest, meditation teacher, author and lyricist of new sacred songs
- Hans-Peter Mayer (1944), politician (CDU), European delegate for Niedersachsen
- Eugen Münch, (DE Wiki) (born 1945), entrepreneur, founder of the Rhön-Klinikum
- Franz Schmidberger (born 1946), Catholic priest and Superior of the Society of Saint Pius X
- Wolfgang Schneiderhan (born 1946), officer, former Inspector General of the Bundeswehr
- Peter Schneider, (DE Wiki) (born 1958), politician (CDU), Member of Parliament
- Wolfgang Amann, (DE Wiki) (born 1959), politician (later CDU) mayor of Geislingen (1998–2014)
- Thomas Treß, (DE Wiki) (born 1966), CEO of Borussia Dortmund, finance and organization
- Uwe Spies (born 1967), former footballer who played 330 games
- Mario Gómez (born 1985), footballer with VfB Stuttgart, played 456 games and 78 for Germany
- Mathias Jänisch (born 1990), a Luxembourger footballer, played over 330 games and 59 for Luxembourg

=== Honorary citizens ===
In the history of the city of Riedlingen, eleven people have been honoured. Wilfried Steuer and Winfried Aßfalg are living honorary citizens.

- 1914: Adolf Gröber (1854–1919), member of the Reichstag and Landtag (Centre Party)
- 1917: Carl Buz (1853–1919), professor
- 1926: Franz Xaver Maier (1859–1931), mayor
- 1953: Theodor Selig (1874–1967), priest
- 1959: Josef Kohler (1879–1967), tax official
- 1964: Kilian Fischer (1886–1975), mayor
- 1967: Franz Zeller (1879–1953), teacher
- 1967: Odilo Burkart (1899–1979), general director
- 1981: Albert Burkart (1898–1982), painter
- 1992: Wilfried Steuer (born 1933), former district councillor, politician (CDU) and former manager in the energy industry
- 2010: Winfried Aßfalg (born 1940), museum director, author, photographer, local historian
