= Rauscher =

Rauscher is a German surname. Notable people with the surname include:

- Andreas Rauscher (born 1978), Austrian footballer
- Christina Rauscher (1570–1618), German official and critic of witch trials
- Elizabeth Rauscher (1937–2019), American physicist
- Frank Rauscher III, cancer researcher
- Franz Rauscher (1900–1988), Austrian politician
- Frederick Rauscher (born 1961), American philosopher
- Joseph Othmar von Rauscher (1797–1875), Austrian Prince-Archbishop of Vienna

== See also ==
- Briggs–Rauscher reaction
