= Anton Zilzer =

Hungarian painter

Anton (Antal) Zilzer (1860 – November 16, 1921) was a Hungarian painter.

He was born in Budapest. He was a pupil of Rauscher, Gregusz, and Székely at the national model school of design, and later studied at the Munich Academy under Raupp, Hackl, Seitz, and Herterich, completing his education at Berlin, Paris, and London.

He devoted himself especially to portraits, and received the Munich gold medal in 1887.

His paintings include:

- Alone in the Woods
- Ludwig II on His Funeral Bier
- Forest Idyls
- Sunset on the Lake of Constance
