= Gyula Zilzer =

Hungarian and American artist (1898–1969)

- Born: Zilzer, Gyula; 3 February 1898; Budapest, Hungary
- Died: 21 November 1969 (aged 71); New York City
- Known for: Engraving
- Notable work: Kaleidoscope; Gas Attack
- Movement: Expressionism

Gyula Zilzer was a Hungarian Jewish artist who became a national of the United States. His engravings from the 1930s foresaw The Holocaust. His works are held by the Metropolitan Museum of Art and the Museum of Modern Art in New York, the Pushkin Museum in Moscow, the Staatliche Graphische Sammlung München in Munich and the Museum of Fine Arts in Budapest.

== Early life ==
Zilzer was born in Budapest, Hungary on 3 February 1898. His uncle was the artist Antal Zilzer and his cousin the ceramic artist Hajnalka Zilzer. His parents were also talented artists. In his youth he showed a strong interest in both painting and technological advances. In 1917, he left Hungary for Russia with two friends. There, they worked on the development of a torpedo controlled by radio waves and were invited to work in a military factory to build this torpedo for the Russian Socialist Federative Soviet Republic, which in 1922 was to become the dominant republic of the Soviet Union. The project was not successful, and the three returned to Budapest. However, the torpedo was eventually secretly patented by the Germans, serving as the basis for further technological innovations related to missile control.

In 1919, the Hungarian government was overthrown, and the Hungarian Communist Party took power, led by Béla Kun. Among the leaders were numerous Jews, including Kun himself. After five months of violence, the new government was in turn overthrown by a conservative nationalist coalition, which installed Miklós Horthy as its leader. Communists and Jews became targets for retribution in a period known as the White Terror and antisemitism was widespread. Zilzer was prevented from continuing his engineering studies because a law had been passed to limit the number of students of Jewish origin in Hungarian universities. So, in 1919, he left Hungary and went to Trieste, Italy. There, he founded a factory with partners, while dedicating himself to art in his spare time. In 1922, he moved to Munich, where he stayed for a year, studying drawing at the school of the German painter, Hans Hofmann.

== Artistic career ==
Returning to Trieste in 1924, Zilzer obtained a certificate stating that he was a Christian and then returned to Hungary. He briefly enrolled at the Academy of Fine Arts in Budapest, where he studied with artists such as János Vaszary and István Csók. However, when his Jewish identity was discovered, he was expelled on the grounds that he "lacked talent". He nevertheless continued his artistic work, producing a collection of lithographs entitled Kaleidoscope, which prophetically captured the possibility of another war in Europe and The Holocaust.

He lived in Paris between 1924 and 1932. There, he worked for the magazine Clarté and the newspaper L'Humanité, both publications of the French Communist Party. While the focus of his writing initially showed a pacifist orientation, from 1929 it took on an anti-fascist character, criticising Adolf Hitler and Benito Mussolini, among others. Among his other work while in Paris was the illustration of French versions of some of the books of Edgar Allan Poe. In 1932 he presented in Amsterdam 24 lithographs called Gas Attack, which condemned the use of the poison gas that was used in World War I. These were published with a foreword by the French author, Romain Rolland. That same year, the lithographs were exhibited in the United States. Also in 1932, he moved to the US and the following year he exhibited in Philadelphia and New York.

In the US he worked for the Works Progress Administration (WPA), the New Deal agency that provided employment for unemployed people, managed public works projects, and constructed buildings and roads. The WPA had a department,the Federal Art Project dedicated to artistic projects, providing work for musicians, designers, painters, actors, and writers. Between 1935 and 1943, approximately 200,000 works of art were produced with WPA support.

In 1936, the year of the Berlin Olympics, when few in America were aware of the existence of the Nazi concentration camps, a drawing by Zilzer was used as the cover of the pamphlet Women and Children Under the Swastika, published in New York. The pamphlet combined eyewitness accounts and images, and included some of the earliest published portrayals of the horrors of Nazi rule, at a time when such information faced disbelief abroad.

In 1939, Zilzer moved to Hollywood and began working in the film industry. Employed as a creative director on films such as The Story of Jack London, and The Miracle of the Bells, he also returned to his interest in inventions and registered several patents. Among those he befriended while in California was the actor, Gregory Peck. After World War II, he briefly returned to Europe before moving, in 1950, to New York City, where he worked for the television networks NBC and Cinerama. Zilzer married his second wife, Mary Fuchs (1910–2001), a Hungarian Jew, in Los Angeles in 1953. He continued painting and exhibiting until his death.

== Death and legacy ==
Zilzer died in New York on 21 November 1969 at his home in West 96th Street.

His works are held, among others, by the Metropolitan Museum of Art and the Museum of Modern Art in New York, the Pushkin Museum in Moscow, the Staatliche Graphische Sammlung München in Munich and the Museum of Fine Arts in Budapest.

His wife died in 2001. She left the documentary estate of her husband to the archives of the National Library of Israel.
