= Szigetbecse =

- Coat of arms

- Location of Szigetbecse in Hungary
- Coordinates: 47°7′46.38″N 18°56′57.77″E
- Country: Hungary
- Region: Central Hungary
- County: Pest
- Subregion: Ráckevei
- Rank: Village

Area
  - Total: 17.12 km^{2} (6.61 sq mi)

Population (1 January 2008)
  - Total: 1,343
  - Density: 78.45/km^{2} (203.2/sq mi)
- Time zone: UTC+1 (CET)
  - Summer (DST): UTC+2 (CEST)
- Postal code: 2321
- Area code: +36 24
- KSH code: 26259
- Website: www.szigetbecse.hu

Szigetbecse is a village in Pest county, Hungary.
