= Karl Caspar =

German painter

- Born: 13 March 1879; Friedrichshafen, Kingdom of Württemberg, German Empire
- Died: 21 September 1956 (aged 77); Brannenburg, Bavaria, West Germany
- Resting place: Brannenburg, Bavaria, West Germany
- Known for: Painting
- Movement: Impressionism, Expressionism
- Spouse: Maria Caspar-Filser (m. 1907–1956)
- Awards: Order of Merit of the Federal Republic of Germany (1950)

Karl Caspar (13 March 1879 – 21 September 1956) was a German painter who lived and worked mainly in Munich.

== Life and work ==
Karl Caspar studied at the State Academy of Fine Arts Stuttgart and the Academy of Fine Arts in Munich. In 1904 Caspar became a member of the Stuttgarter Künstlerbund (Stuttgart Artists' Association), and in 1906 he joined the Deutscher Künstlerbund (German Artists' Association). In 1907 he married fellow-painter and childhood friend and neighbor, Maria Filser. In 1913, he was a founding member of the artists' association Münchener Neue Secession, to which painters like Alexej von Jawlensky, Adolf Erbslöh, Wladimir von Bechtejeff, Paul Klee, and Alexander Kanoldt also belonged. In 1919 he became the chairman of the association. A high point of Caspar's work was the Passion Altar of 1916/1917, housed in the crypt of the Frauenkirche.

From 1922 to 1937 Caspar was a professor at the Academy of Fine Arts in Munich. His works were exhibited in the Degenerate Art Exhibition, which was organized in Munich by the Nazis in 1937. Thereafter, his Christianity-inspired paintings and drawings, influenced equally by Impressionism and Expressionism, were removed from German museums and public collections and/or destroyed, and he was forced to retire from his teaching position. That same year (some sources say the year was 1944, after his Munich house was destroyed in a bombing raid), due to Nazi hostility, he settled with his family in Brannenburg, where he is buried.

As early as 1946, Caspar was reappointed professor at the Academy of Fine Arts in Munich. In 1948 he was one of the founding members of the Bavarian Academy of Fine Arts. That same year, he participated in the Venice Biennale. In 1950 he was awarded the Order of Merit of the Federal Republic of Germany. In 1952, he was awarded the first Upper Swabian Art Prize, jointly with his wife. In 1955, a year before his death, he became a member of the Berlin Academy of Arts.

His students include Joseph Loher and Gretel Loher-Schmeck, who belong to the Lost Generation, Fred Thieler and Richard Stumm and Peter Paul Etz.

== Public collections of works ==
Germany

- Abteiberg Museum, Mönchengladbach
- Zeppelin Museum

Poland

- Sztuki Museum, Łódź

USA

- Faulconer Gallery, Grinnell, Iowa
- Los Angeles County Museum of Art, Los Angeles, California
