= Raupp =

Raupp is a surname. Notable people with the surname include:

- Karl Raupp (1837–1918), German painter
- Manfred G. Raupp (born 1941), German agricultural scientist and economist
- Roger Raupp (born 1963), American artist
- Valdir Raupp (born 1955), Brazilian politician
- Andrew B. Raupp American educationist

== See also ==
- Surname Raup
