= Maria Caspar-Filser =

German painter

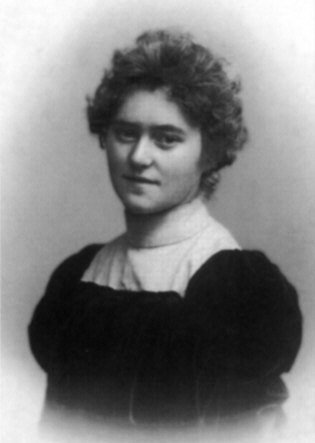
- Maria Filser, photograph circa 1900
- Born: 7 August 1878; Riedlingen, Kingdom of Württemberg, German Empire
- Died: 12 February 1968 (aged 89); Brannenburg, Bavaria, West Germany
- Known for: Painting
- Movement: Impressionism, Expressionism
- Spouse: Karl Caspar
- Awards: Order of Merit of the Federal Republic of Germany
- Website: maria-caspar-filser.com

Maria Caspar-Filser (7 August 1878 – 12 February 1968) was a German painter. She lived and worked mainly in Munich.

== Life and work ==
Maria Filser grew up in rural southwestern Germany. She studied at the State Academy of Fine Arts Stuttgart and the Academy of Fine Arts in Munich. She married the painter Karl Caspar, who had been a childhood friend and neighbour, in 1907 and took the name Caspar-Filser. In 1909 she became a member of the Deutscher Künstlerbund (German Association of Artists). In 1913, she was the only woman among the founding members of the artists' association Münchener Neue Secession. In 1925 she became the first German woman painter to be awarded the title of professor. She taught at the Academy of Fine Arts in Munich. In 1928 she took part in the Venice Biennale. Caspar-Filser primarily painted flowers, gardens and landscapes, influenced equally by Impressionism and Expressionism.

The Nazis considered Caspar-Filser's paintings "degenerate" and began to persecute her. In 1933 she lost her professorship. In 1936, Caspar-Filser's paintings were removed from an exhibition at the Neue Pinakothek. In the wake of the Degenerate Art Exhibition in Munich on 19 July 1937, her artworks were removed from all museums and public collections and many were destroyed. That same year (some sources say the year was 1944, after her Munich house was destroyed in a bombing raid), Nazi hostility caused her to relocate with her family to Brannenburg, where she lived until her death.

In 1947, Caspar-Filser became the first recipient of the Prize in Visual Arts of the City of Munich. A year later she again participated in the Venice Biennale. In 1950 she was one of the founding members of the re-established Deutscher Künstlerbund. In 1951 she became a member of the Bavarian Academy of Fine Arts. In 1952, she was awarded the Upper Swabian Art Prize, jointly with her husband. In 1959, she became the first woman painter to be awarded the Order of Merit of the Federal Republic of Germany. She was awarded the Medal of the City of Paris at an exhibition at Musée National d'Art Moderne in 1961. In 1962, she was awarded the Culture Prize of the City of Rosenheim.

Her brother Benno Filser worked as a publisher in Augsburg and Munich.

An exhibition of her paintings – the first in more than two decades – was held at Hohenkarpfen Art Museum, from March to July 2013. The exhibition was organized in cooperation with the city of Ochsenhausen and took place in the Ochsenhausen monastery.
