= Frank Rauscher III =

Frank J. Rauscher III
- Education: Moravian College, State University of New York at Buffalo
- Scientific career
- Fields: Genetics of cancer
- Thesis: Isolation and characterization of somatic cell mutants resistant to auromomycin, neocarzinostatin and bleomycin (1987)

Frank J. Rauscher III was an American researcher at The Wistar Institute in Philadelphia. Rauscher is also a professor of genetics at the University of Pennsylvania School of Medicine. He graduated from Moravian College in 1979. His research focuses on mechanisms responsible for gene silencing during development and homeostasis and disruptions associated with the initiation of tumors.

When Rauscher first arrived at Wistar, one of his research priorities was the tumor suppressor gene wt1 and its role in the development of Wilms' tumor. Rauscher's research found that if wt1 is mutated, cells of the kidney might continue to grow out of control.

Rauscher is the former editor-in-chief of the journal Cancer Research. He is the son of Frank J. Rauscher, Jr., former director of the National Cancer Institute.

== Select publications ==
- Iyengar S, Ivanov AV, Jin VX, Rauscher FJ 3rd, Farnham PJ., Functional analysis of KAP1 genomic recruitment., Molecular and Cellular Biology. 2011 May;31(9):1833-47.
- Mellert HSA, Stanek TJ, Sykes SM, Rauscher FJ, Schultz DC, McMahon SB., Deacetylation of the DNA-binding domain regulates p53-mediated apoptosis., Journal of Biological Chemistry. 2011 Feb 11;286(6):4264-70.
- Negorev DG, Vladimirova OV, Kossenkov AV, Nikonova EV, Demarest RM, Capobianco AJ, Showe MK, Rauscher FJ, Showe LC, Maul GG., Sp 100 as a potent tumor suppressor: accelerated senescence and rapid malignant transformation of human fibroblasts through modulation of an embryonic stem cell program., Cancer Research. 2010 Dec 1;70(23):9991-10001.
- Yu H, Mashtalir N, Daou S, Hammond-Martel I, Ross J, Sui G, Hart GW, Rauscher FJ 3rd, Drobetsky E, Milot E, Shi Y, Affar EB., The ubiquitin carboxyl hydrolase BAP1 forms a ternary complex with YY! and HCF-1 and is a critical regulator of gene expression., Molecular and Cellular Biology. 2010 Nov;30(21):5071-85.
- Hou Z, Peng H, White DE, Wang P, Lieberman PM, Halazonetis T, Rauscher FJ3rd., 14-3-3 binding sites in the snail protein are essential for snail-mediated transcriptional repression and epithelial-mesenchymal differentiation., Cancer Research. 2010 Jun 1;70(11):4385-93. [Epub 2010 May 25] Erratum in: Cancer Res. 2010 Sep 1;70(17):7012-3.
