= List of women sculptors =

This is a list of female sculptors – women notable for their three-dimensional artistic work (including sound and light). Do not add entries for those without a Wikipedia article.

== A ==
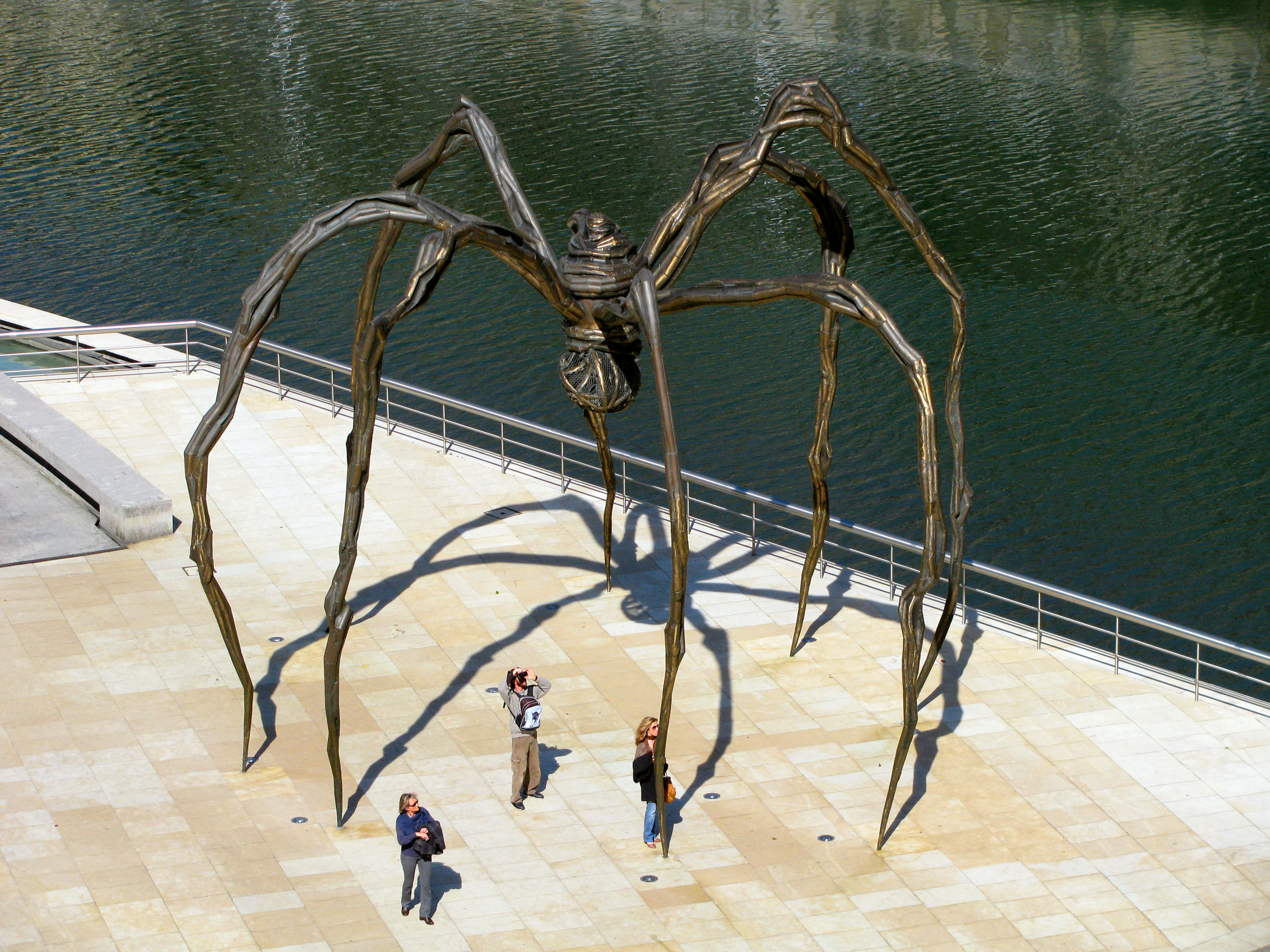
Louise Bourgeois (1911-2010), Maman, outside Guggenheim Museum Bilbao, Bilbao, Spain

- Magdalena Abakanowicz (1930–2017), Poland
- Tamar Abakelia (1905–1953), Georgia
- Elfriede Abbe (1919–2012), United States
- Pablita Abeyta (1953–2017), United States
- Carrie Abramovitz (1913–1999), United States
- Jane Ackroyd (born 1957), United Kingdom
- Alice Adams (born 1930), United States
- Pauline Aitken (1893–1958), United Kingdom
- Diana Al-Hadid (born 1981), Syria
- Tina Allen (1949–2008), United States
- Ignacia d'Almeida (1640-?), Portugal
- Sarah Fisher Ames (1817–1901), United States
- Grimanesa Amorós (born 1962, Peru), United States
- Catherine Andras (1775–1860), United Kingdom
- Beatrice Angle (1859–1915), United Kingdom
- Norah Ansell (1906–1990), United Kingdom
- Janine Antoni (born 1964), United States
- Vivien ap Rhys Pryce (born 1937), United Kingdom
- Polly Apfelbaum (born 1955), United States
- Rachel Ara (born 1965), United Kingdom
- Phyllis Archibald (1880–1947), United Kingdom
- Ruth Asawa (1926–2013), United States
- Felicity Askew (born 1899), United Kingdom
- Evelin Winifred Aston (1891–1975), United Kingdom
- Benita Armstrong (1907–2004), United Kingdom
- C.C. van Asch van Wijck (1900–1932), Netherlands
- Manon Awst (born 1983), United Kingdom
- Alice Aycock (born 1946), United States

== B ==
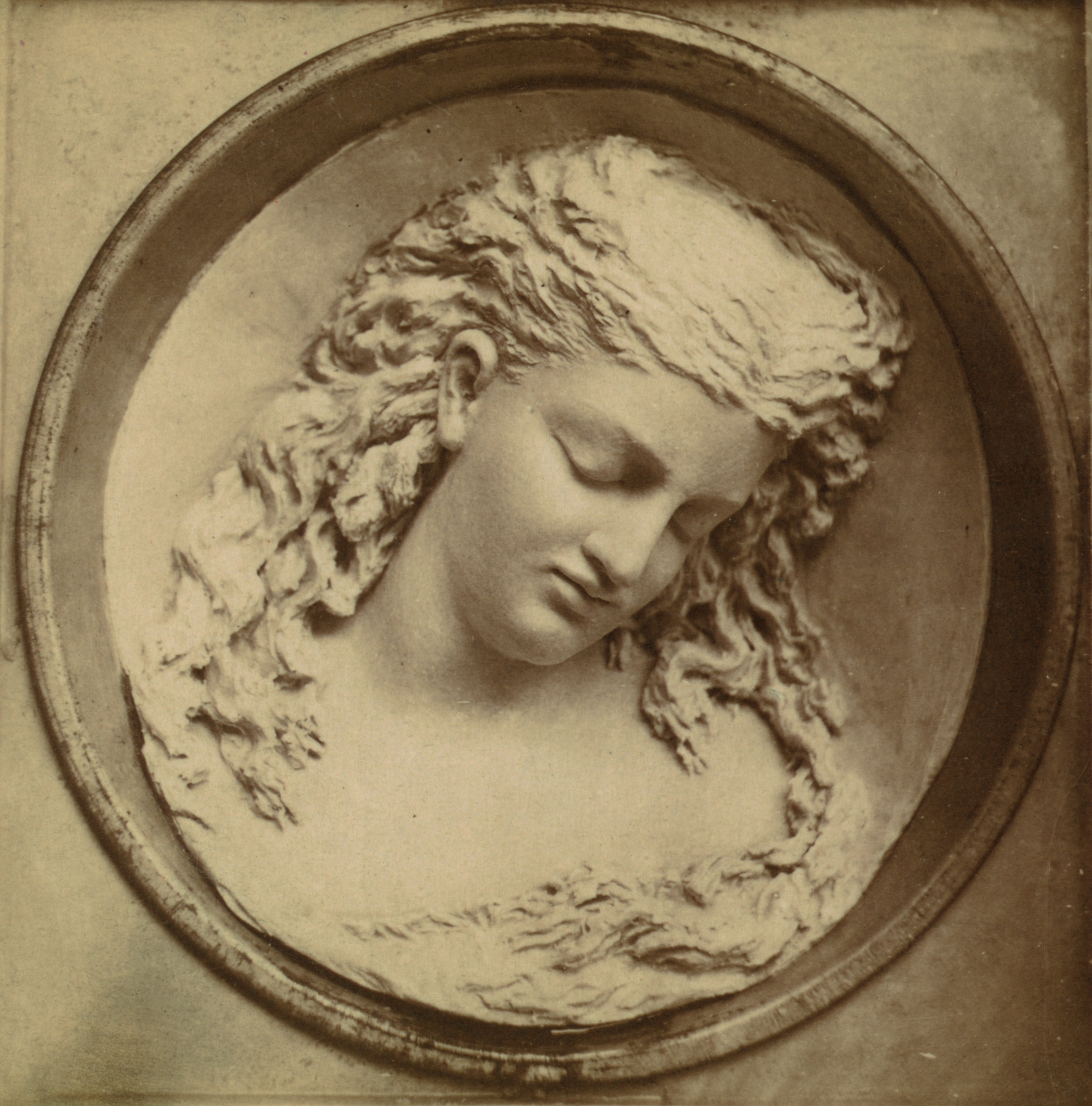
Caroline Shawk Brooks, The Dreaming Iolanthe, (1876), butter sculpture exhibited at 1876 Centennial Exposition

- Inge Bagge (1916–1988), Sweden
- Frances Bagley (born 1946), United States
- Ethelwyn Baker (1899–1988), United Kingdom
- Caroline Peddle Ball (1869–1938), United States
- Zofia Baltarowicz-Dzielińska (1894–1970), Poland
- Fiona Banner (born 1966), United Kingdom
- Frida Baranek (born 1961), Brazil
- Gladys Barron (1884–1967), United Kingdom
- Edith Bateson (1867–1938), United Kingdom
- Emilia Bayer (born 1934), Bulgaria
- Edith Anna Bell (1870–1929), Ireland
- Jeanne Bell (1888–1978), United Kingdom
- Carolina Benedicks-Bruce (1856–1935), Sweden
- Lynda Benglis (born 1941), United States
- Eva Benson (1875–1949), Australia
- Guri Berg (born 1963), Norway
- Lía Bermúdez (1930–2021), Venezuela
- Huma Bhabha (born 1962), Pakistan
- Joyce Bidder (1906–1999), United Kingdom
- Electra Waggoner Biggs (1912–2001), United States
- Camille Billops (1933–2019), United States
- Audrey Blackman (1907–1990), United Kingdom
- Naomi Blake (1924–2018), United Kingdom
- Marguerite Louis Blasingame (1906–1947), United States
- Lucienne Bloch (1909–1999), United States
- Sigrid Blomberg (1863–1941), Sweden
- Judith Bluck (1936–2011), United Kingdom
- Frida Blumenberg (born 1935), South Africa
- Delphine Boël (born 1968), Belgium
- Simone Boisecq (1922–2012), Algeria and France
- Thyra Boldsen (1884–1968), Denmark
- Lee Bontecou (1931–2022), United States
- Chakaia Booker (born 1953), United States
- Isabelle de Borchgrave (1946–2024), Belgium
- Christine Borland (born 1965), United Kingdom
- Daisy Theresa Borne (1906–1998), United Kingdom
- Madeleine Boschan (born 1979), Germany
- Pauline Boumphrey (1886–1959), United States
- Louise Bourgeois (1911–2010), France/United States
- Paige Bradley (born circa 1975), United States
- Marianne Brandt (1893–1983), Germany
- Bessie Marsh Brewer (1884–1952), United States
- Aleksandra Briede (1901—1992), Latvia
- María Brito (born 1947), Cuba
- Caroline Shawk Brooks (1840–1913), United States
- Deborah Brown (1927–2023), United Kingdom
- Irene Mary Browne (1881–1977), United Kingdom
- Michelle de Bruin (born 1967), United Kingdom
- Emilie Benes Brzezinski (1932–2022), Switzerland
- Heidi Bucher (1926–1993), Switzerland
- Krista Buecking (born 1982), Canada
- Kari Buen (born 1938), Norway
- Hede Bühl (born 1940), Germany
- Alicja Buławka-Fankidejska (born 1983), Poland
- Selma Burke (1900–1995), United States
- Edith Woodman Burroughs (1871–1916), United States
- Deborah Butterfield (born 1949), United States
- Fanny Byse (born 1849), United Kingdom

== C ==
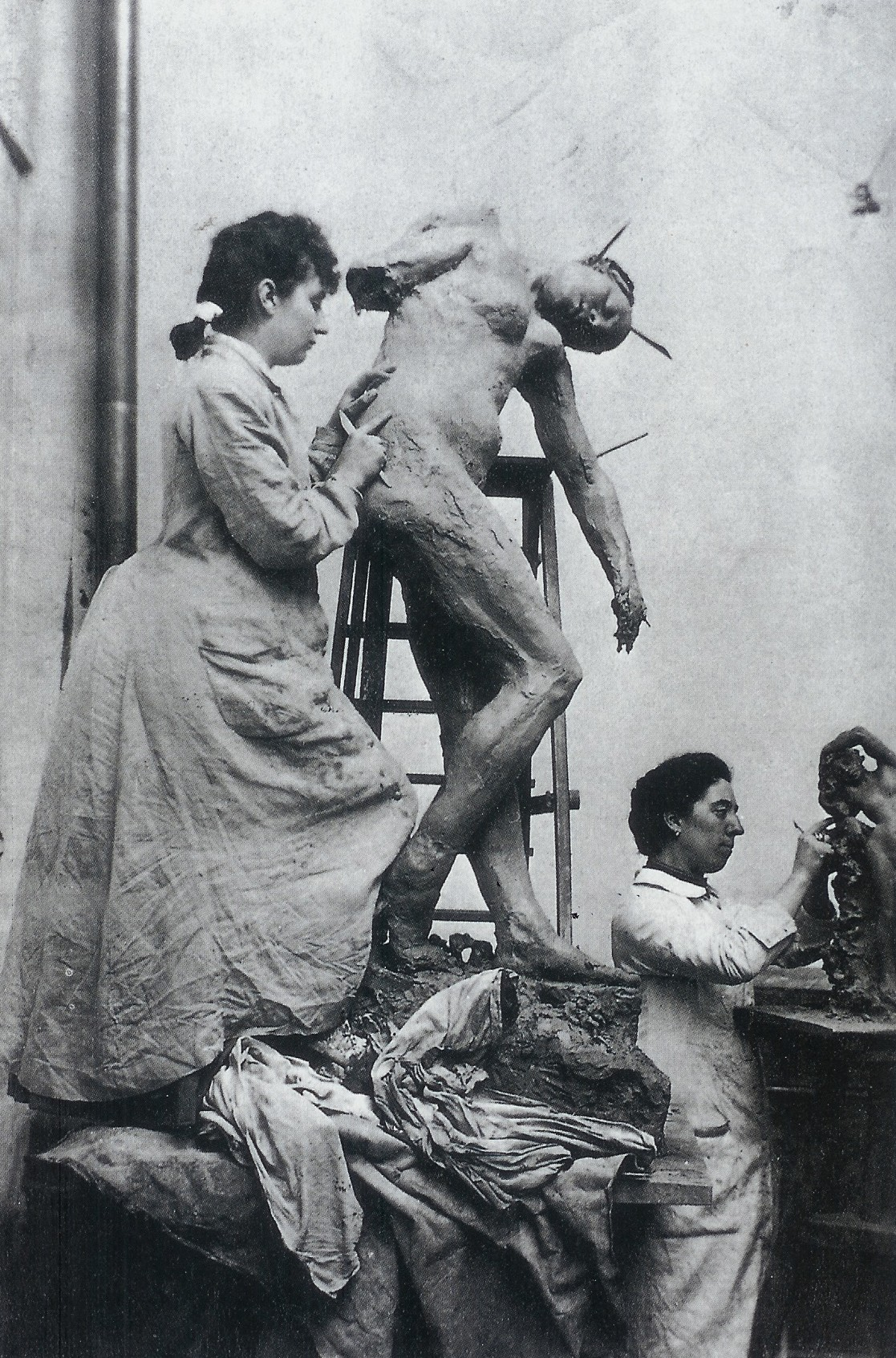
Camille Claudel (left), and Jessie Lipscomb at their studio, 117 de la rue Notre-Dame-des-Champs, Paris, 1887

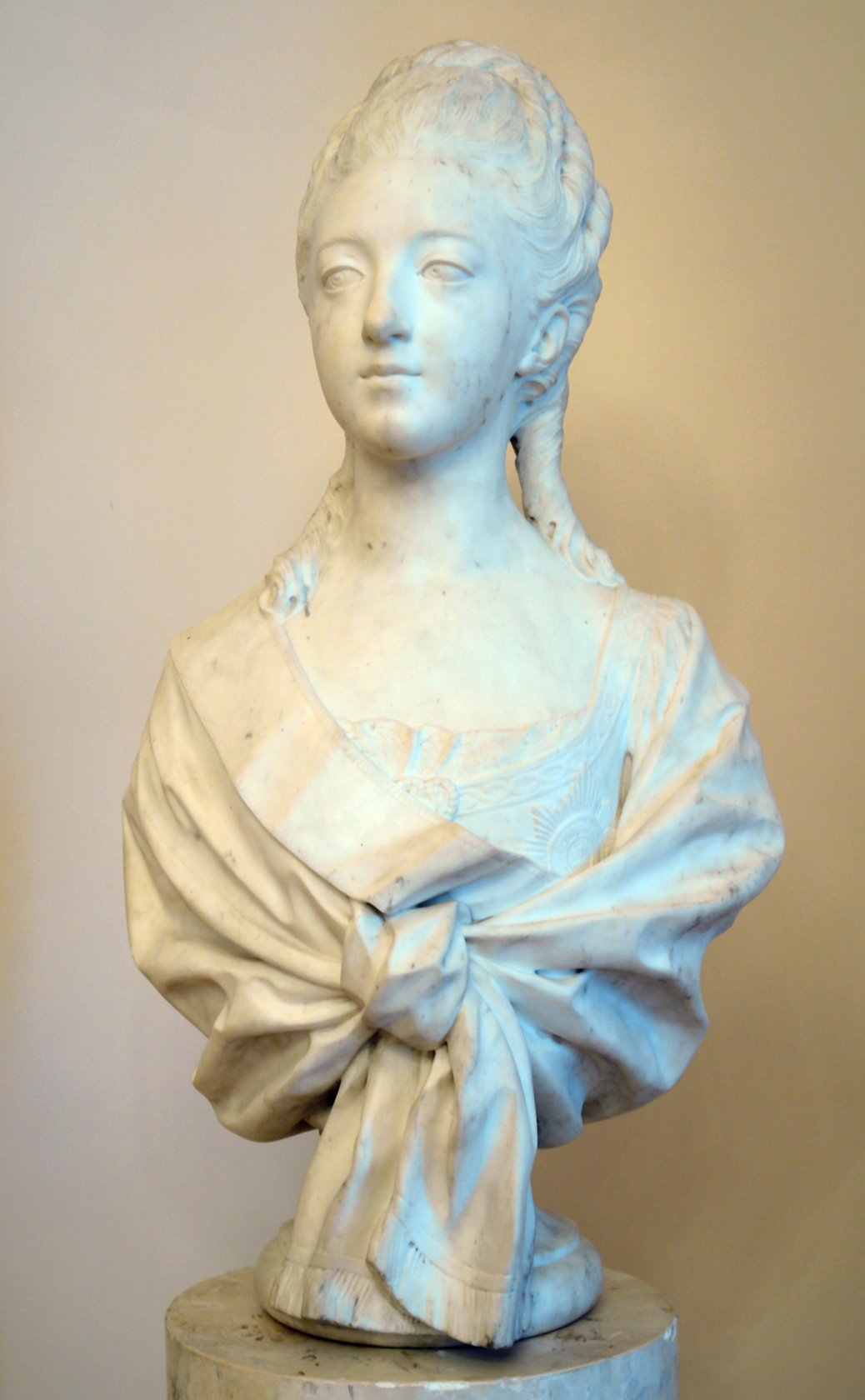
Marie-Anne Collot, Portrait of the Grand Duchess Natalya Alexeyevna (1775)

- Claude Cahun (1894–1954), France
- Florence Callcott (1866–1936), United Kingdom
- Mary Callery (1903–1977), United States
- Estella Campavias (1918–1990), United Kingdom
- Eleanor Cardozo (born 1965), United Kingdom
- Anne Marie Carl-Nielsen (1863–1945), Denmark
- Diane Carr (born 1946), United States
- Elizabeth Catlett (1915–2012), United States
- Marie Cazin (1845–1924), France
- Vija Celmins (born 1938), Latvia
- Lynn Chadwick (1914–2003), United Kingdom
- Elisabeth Gordon Chandler (1913–2006), United States
- Cornellia Van A. Chapin (1893–1973), United States
- Alice Chaplin (1848–1921), United Kingdom
- Judy Chicago (born 1939), United States
- Doris Totten Chase (1923–2008), United States
- Saloua Raouda Choucair (1916–2017), Lebanon
- Fanny Lam Christie (born 1952), Hong Kong
- Anna Chromy (1940–2021), throughout Europe
- Chryssa (1933–2013), Greece
- Lygia Clark (1920–1988), Brazil
- Camille Claudel (1864–1943), France
- Shelagh Cluett (1947–2007), United Kingdom
- Helen Mary Coaton (1911–2005), United Kingdom
- Josette Hébert-Coëffin (1906–1973), France
- Mirit Cohen (1945–1990), Israel
- Nessa Cohen (1885–1976), United States
- Ola Cohn (1892–1964), Australia
- Marie-Anne Collot (1748–1821), France
- Marta Colvin (1907–1995), Chile
- Angela Conner (born 1935), United Kingdom
- Ellen Rankin Copp (1853–1901), United States
- Christine Corday (born 1970), United States
- Kate Cory (1861–1958), United States
- Petah Coyne (born 1953), United States
- Doris Crane (1911–1999), United Kingdom
- Meg Cranston (born 1960), United States
- Cresilla, ancient Greece
- Stella Rebecca Crofts (1898–1964), United Kingdom
- Lena Cronqvist (1938–2025), Sweden
- Dorothy Cross (born 1956), Ireland
- Marianne Csaky (born 1959), Hungary
- Beth Cullen-Kerridge (born 1970), United Kingdom
- Fern Cunningham, (1949–2020) United States
- Ella Rose Curtois (1860–1944), United Kingdom

== D ==
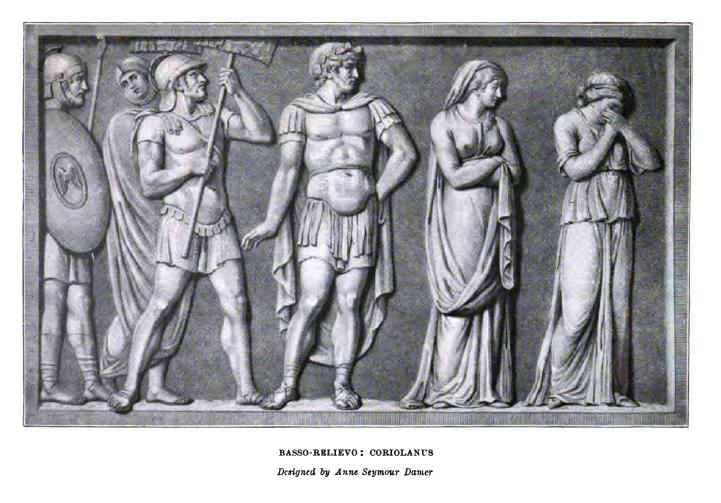
Anne Seymour Damer, Coriolanus, c.1788, bas relief

- Anna Dabis (1847–1927), Germany
- Elsie Dahlberg-Sundberg (1916–2005), Sweden
- Greta Dale (1929–1978), Canada
- Anne Seymour Damer (1749–1828), United Kingdom
- Joan Danziger (born 1934), United States
- Frances Darlington (1880–1940), United Kingdom
- Lea Davidova-Medene (1921–1986), Latvia
- Anne Davidson (1937–2008), United Kingdom
- Emma Lu Davis (1905–1988), United States
- Elizabeth de Cuevas (1929–2023), French-born American
- Dorothy Dehner (1901–1994), United States
- Jennie Delahunt (1877–1954), United Kingdom
- Claudia DeMonte (born 1947), United States
- Lesley Dill (born 1950), United States
- Isabella Discalzi Mazzoni, (c. 15.–16. cent.), Italy
- Michele Oka Doner (born 1945), United States
- Mary Donington (1909–1987), United Kingdom
- Seena Donneson (1924–2020), United States
- Marjorie Drawbell (1903–2000), United Kingdom
- Violet Dreschfeld (1890–1975), United Kingdom
- Dr. Gindi (born 1965), Switzerland
- Ellen Driscoll (born 1953), United States
- Orshi Drozdik (born 1946), Hungary
- Arta Dumpe (born 1933), Latvia
- Susan Durant (1827–1873), United Kingdom
- Điềm Phùng Thị (1920–2002), Vietnam

== E ==
- Abastenia St. Leger Eberle (1878–1942), United States
- Ursula Edgcumbe (1900–1985), United Kingdom
- Nicole Eisenman (born 1965), United States
- Lin Emery (1928–2021), United States
- Céline Emilian (1898–1983), Romania
- Tracey Emin (born 1963), United Kingdom
- Marisol Escobar (1930–2016), Europe/the Americas
- Helen Escobedo (1934–2010), Mexico
- Gisèle d'Estoc (1845-1894), France
- Roberta Everett (1906–1979), United Kingdom

== F ==
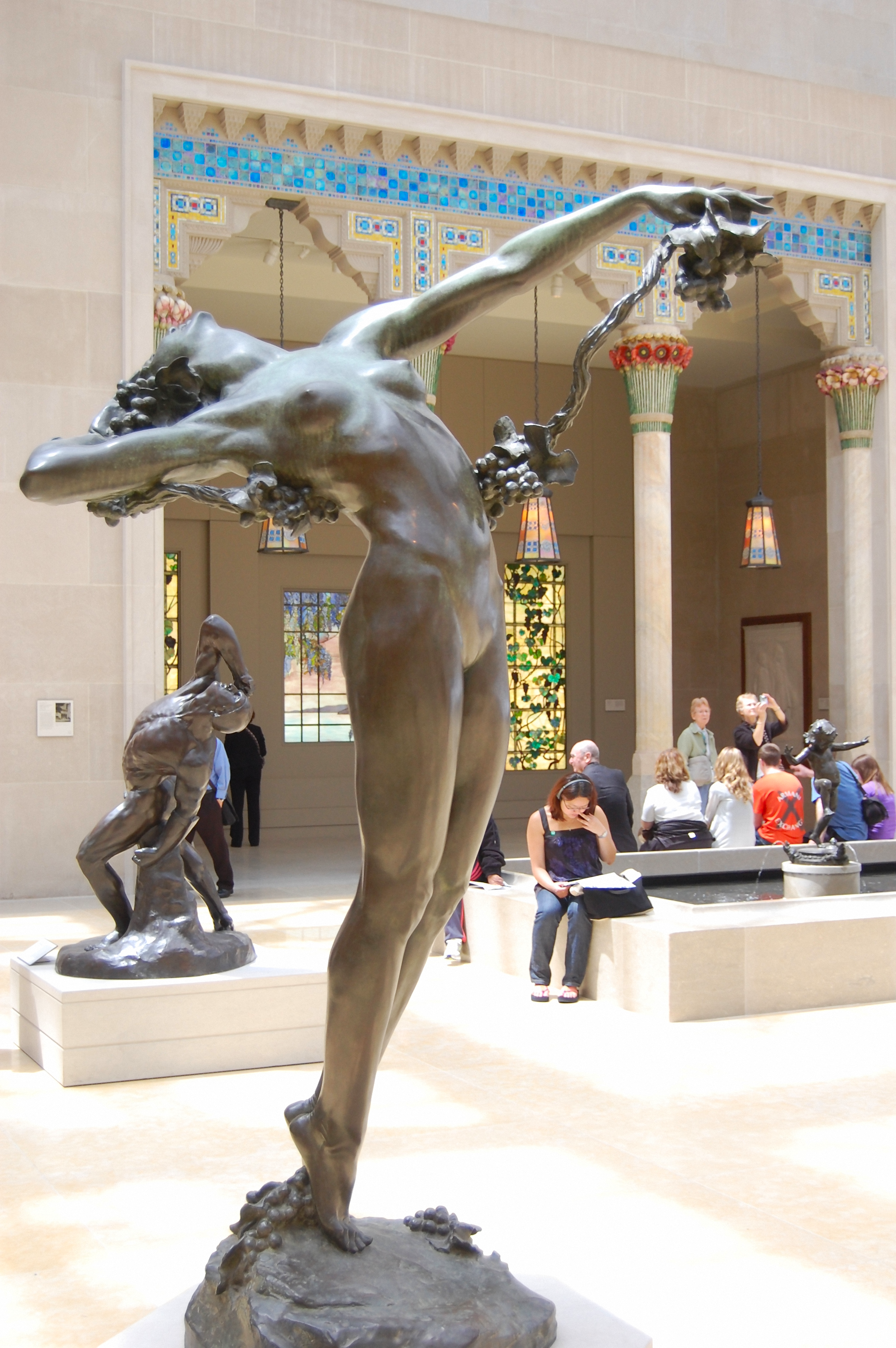
Harriet Whitney Frishmuth, The Vine (1923), Metropolitan Museum of Art, New York City

- Claire Falkenstein (1908–1997), United States
- Abigail Fallis (born 1969), United Kingdom
- Bita Fayyazi (born 1962), Iran
- Rachel Feinstein (born 1971), United States
- Claire Fejes (1920–1998), United States
- Sonja Ferlov Mancoba (1911–1984), Denmark
- Teresita Fernández (born 1968), United States
- Jackie Ferrara (1929–2025), United States
- Carole Feuerman (born 1945), United States
- Ailene Fields (born 1948), United States
- Edith Fischerström (1881–1967), Sweden
- Audrey Flack (1931–2024), United States
- Sylvie Fleury (born 1961), Switzerland
- Dominique Gonzalez-Foerster (born 1965), France
- Margaret Foley (1820–1877), United States
- Laura Ford (born 1961), United Kingdom
- Agnes Freda Forres (c. 1880–1942), United Kingdom
- Alina Forsman (1845–1899), Finland
- Sairi Forsman (born 1964), Mexico
- Julieta de França (1870–1951), Brazilian sculptor
- Elsa Fraenkel (1892–1975), Germany/United Kingdom
- Ruth Francken (1924–2006), United States
- Jane Frank (Jane Schenthal Frank), (1918–1986), United States
- Mary Frank (born 1933), United Kingdom
- Laura Gardin Fraser (1889–1966), United States
- Elisabeth Frink (1930–1993), United Kingdom
- Harriet Whitney Frishmuth (1880–1980), United States
- Meta Vaux Warrick Fuller (1877–1968), United States
- Victoria Fuller (born 1953), United States

== G ==
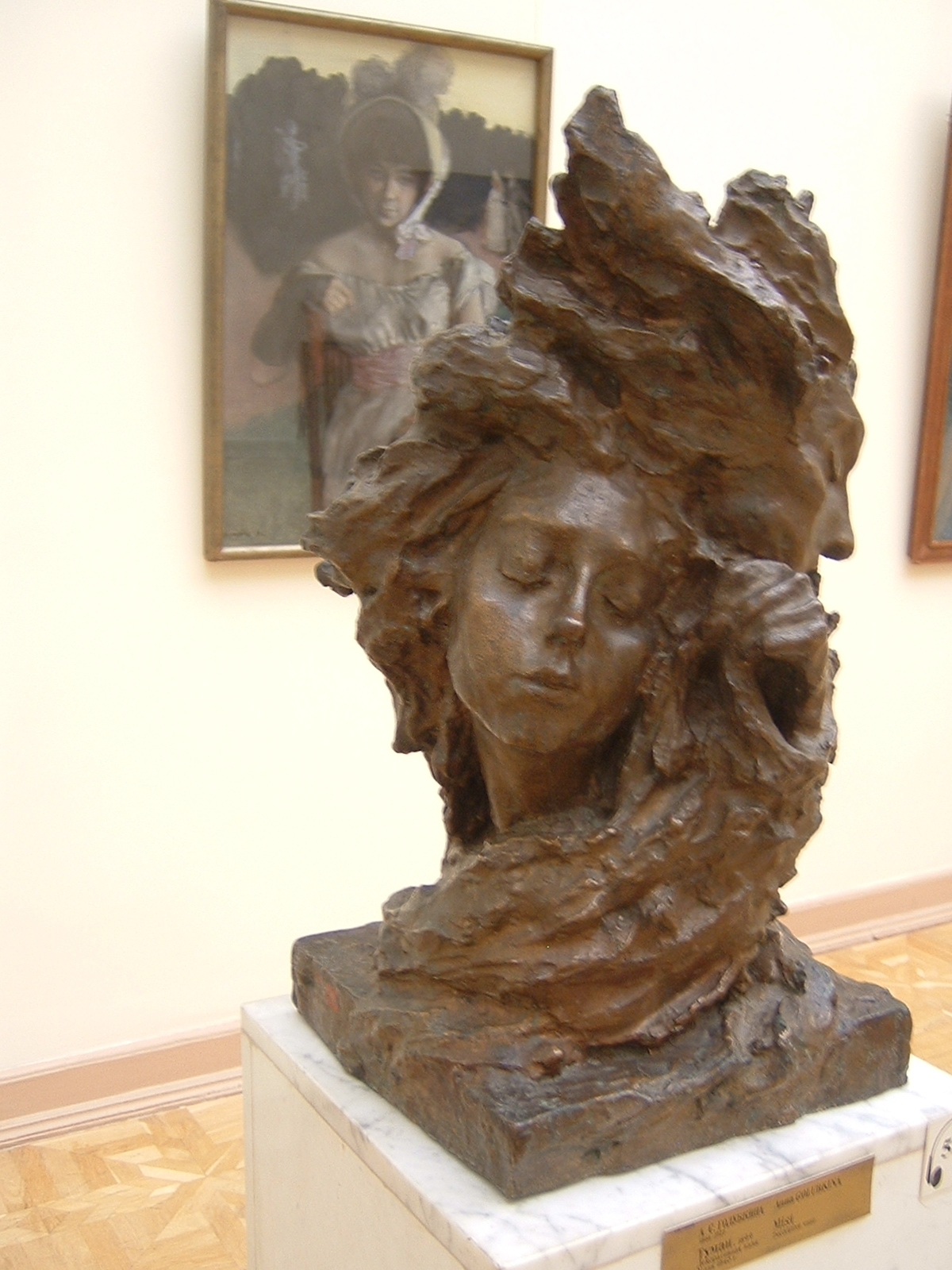
Anna Golubkina, Mist (1899)

- Edith Mabel Gabriel (1882–1972), United Kingdom
- Anya Gallaccio (born 1963), Scotland
- Lily Garafulic (1914–2012), Chile
- Tammy Garcia (born 1969), United States
- Doreen Garner (born 1986), United States
- Rosalie Gascoigne (1917–1999), Australia
- Gill Gatfield (born 1963), New Zealand
- Marea Gazzard (1928–2013), Australia
- Gego (1912–1994), Germany
- Helen Margaret George (1883–1982), United Kingdom
- Isa Genzken (born 1948), Germany
- Eugenie Gershoy (1901–1983), United States
- Ann Gillen (born 1935), United States
- Gerður Helgadóttir (1928–1975), Iceland
- Louise Giblin (born 1963), United Kingdom
- Margaret Giles (1868–1949), United Kingdom
- Karin Giusti (born 1955), United States
- Anna Golubkina (1864–1927), Russia
- Frances M. Goodwin (1855–1929), United States
- Dora Gordine (1895–1991), United Kingdom
- Elsa Gramcko (1925–1994), Venezuela
- Mary Grant (1831–1908), Scotland
- Nancy Graves (1939–1995), United States
- Renee Green (born 1959), United States
- Christine Gregory (1879–1963), United Kingdom
- Lillian Griffith (1877–1972), Wales
- Mimi Gross (born 1940), United States
- Catrin G Grosse (born 1964), Germany
- Sabina Grzimek (born 1942), Germany
- Gunnfríður Jónsdóttir (1889–1968), Iceland
- Ángela Gurría (1929–2023), Mexico
- Eva Gyldén (1885–1973), Finland

== H ==
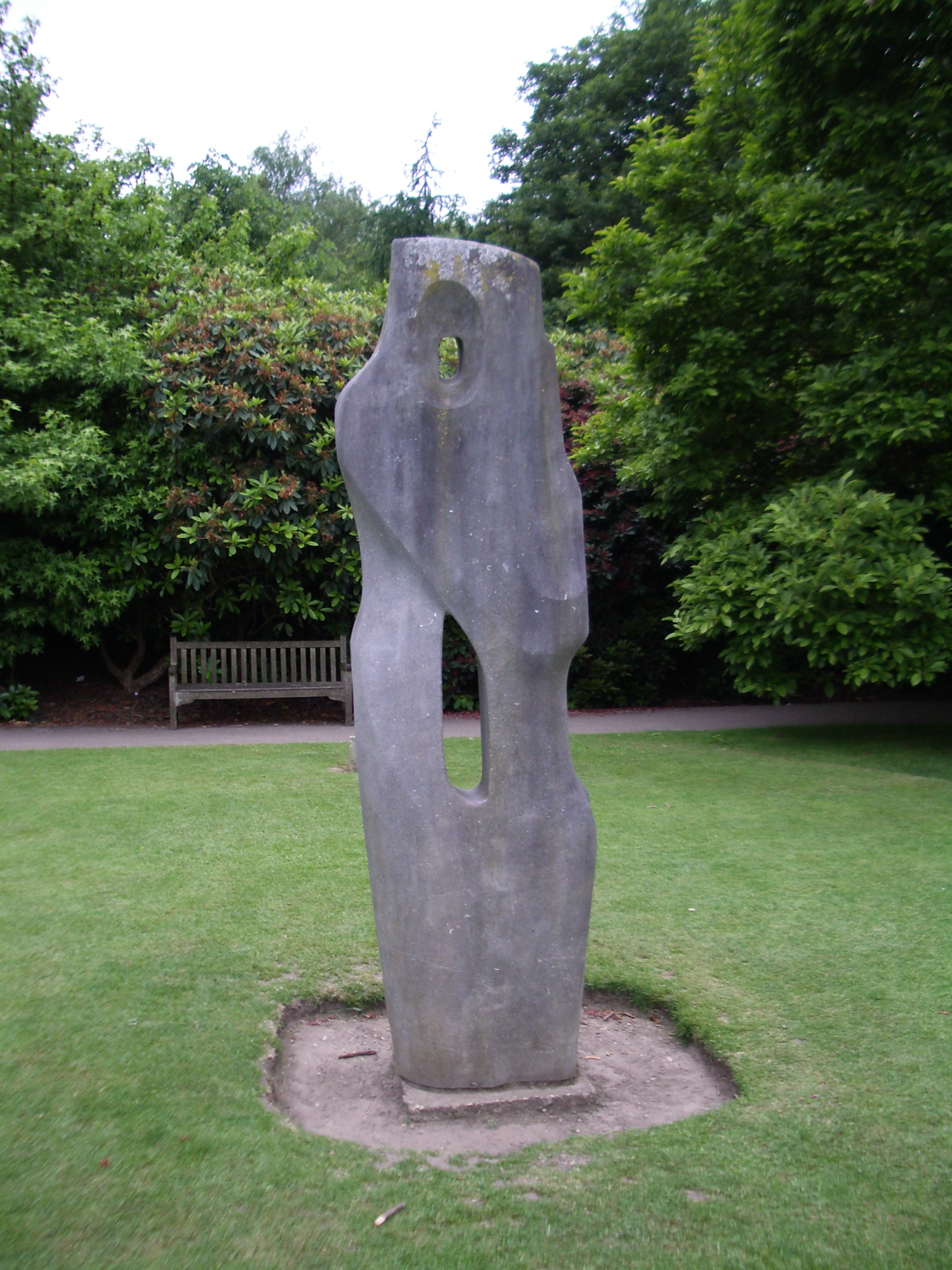
Barbara Hepworth, Monolith-Empyrean, 1953, Kenwood House, London

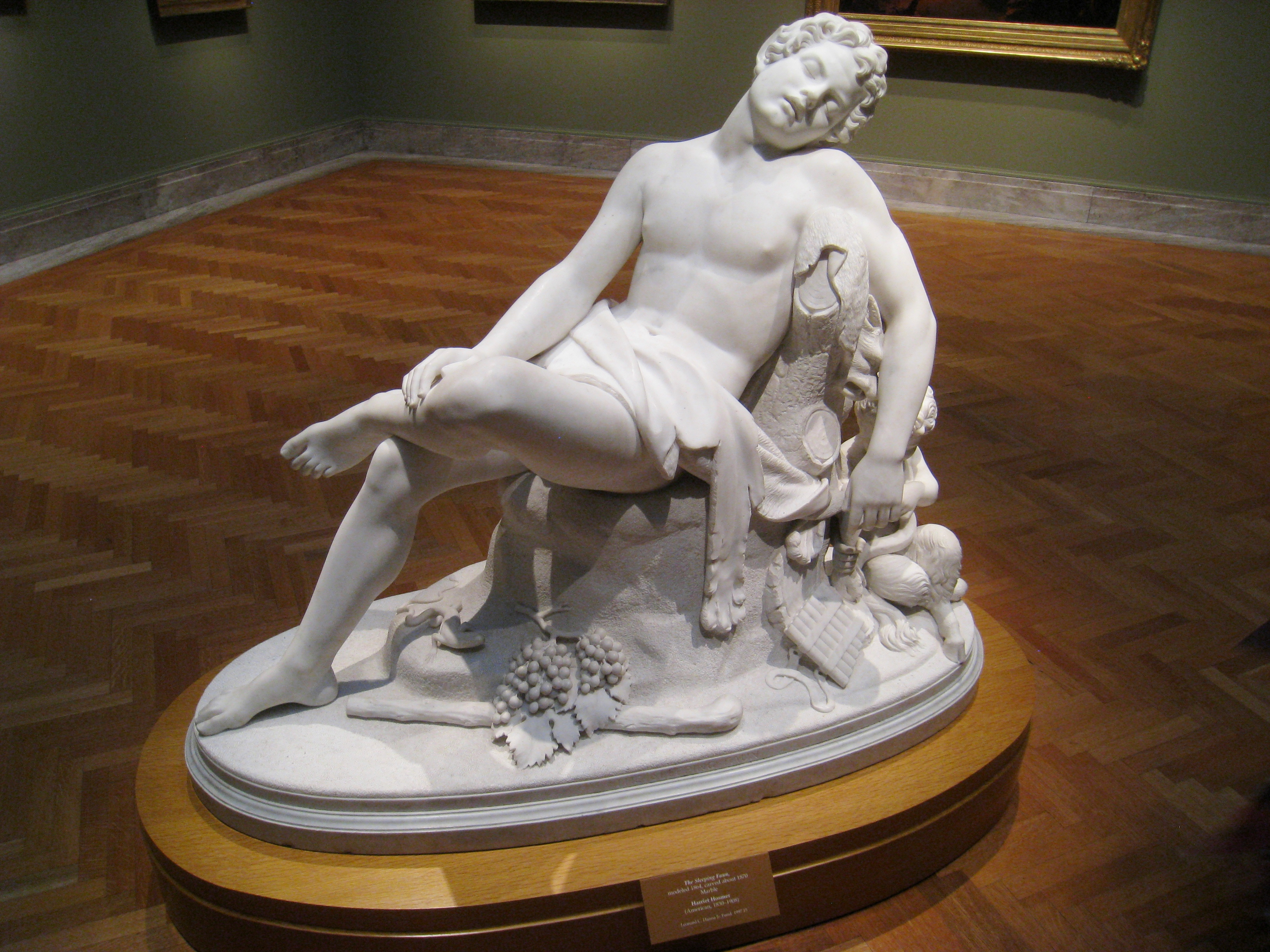
Harriet Hosmer, The Sleeping Faun (c. 1870), Cleveland Museum of Art

- Gabriela von Habsburg (born 1956), Europe
- Emmeline Halse (1853–1930), United Kingdom
- Maggi Hambling (born 1945), United Kingdom
- Ann Hamilton (artist) (born 1956), United States
- Harmony Hammond (born 1944), United States
- Han Sai Por (born 1943), Singapore
- Berta Hansson (1910–1994), painter, sculptor and textile artist
- Rachel Harrison (born 1966), United States
- Bessie Harvey (1929–1994), United States
- Mona Hatoum (born 1952), Lebanon
- Laila Havilio (born 1960), Chile
- Jann Haworth (born 1942), United States
- Gabriel Hayes (1909–1978), Ireland
- Faye HeavyShield (born 1953), Canada
- Deborah Hede (born 1959), United States
- Mathilde ter Heijne (born 1969), France/Germany
- Camille Henrot (born 1978), France
- Barbara Hepworth (1903–1975), United Kingdom
- Gertrude Hermes (1901–1983), United Kingdom
- Eva Hesse (1936–1970), United States
- Eileen Hickman-Smith (1909–1970), United Kingdom
- Nicola Hicks (born 1960), United Kingdom
- Helena Hietanen (born 1963), Finland
- Amelia Robertson Hill (1820–1904), Scotland
- Eila Hiltunen (1922–2003), Finland
- Margel Hinder (1906–1995), Australia
- Nicky Hirst (born 1963), United Kingdom
- Janet Hodgson (1960–2016), England
- Margarete Hoenerbach (1848–1924), Germany
- Malvina Hoffman (1885–1966), United States
- Elizabeth Bradford Holbrook (1913–2009), Canada
- Nancy Holt (1938–2014), United States
- Sara Holt (born 1946), United States/France
- Jenny Holzer (born 1950), United States
- Rebecca Horn (1944–2024), Germany
- Roni Horn (born 1955), United States
- Jocelyn Horner (1902–1973), United Kingdom
- Harriet Hosmer (1830–1908), United States
- Shirazeh Houshiary (born 1955), Iran
- Rachel Lee Hovnanian, (born 1959), American artist
- Irma Hünerfauth (1907–1998), Germany
- Anita Huffington (1934–2025), United States
- Nene Humphrey (born 1947), United States
- Anna Hyatt Huntington (1876–1973), United States

== I ==
- Yiota Ioannidou (born 1971), Cyprus
- Pamela Irving (born 1960), Australia
- Linde Ivimey (born 1965), Australia

== J ==
- Ann James (artist) (1925–2011), United Kingdom/Canada
- May Howard Jackson (1877–1931), United States
- Heather Jansch (1948–2021), United Kingdom
- Jiang Shuo (蔣朔, born 1958), China
- Patricia Johanson (1940–2024), United States
- Adelaide Johnson (1859–1955), United States
- Arnrid Johnston (1895–1972), Sweden
- Jacobine Jones (1897–1976), United Kingdom/Canada
- Karin Jonzen (1914–1998), United Kingdom
- Betty Jukes (1910–2006), United Kingdom

== K ==
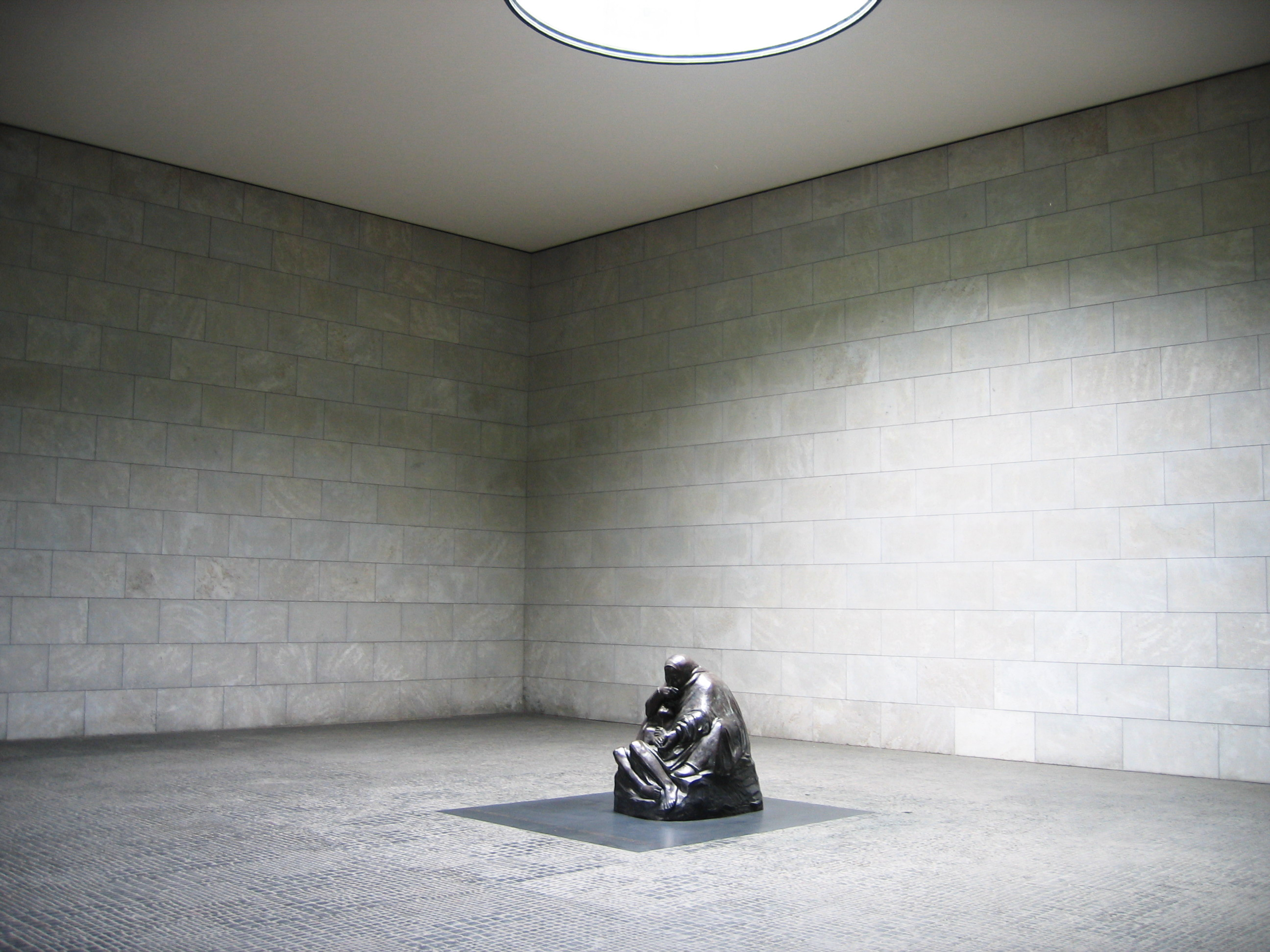
Käthe Kollwitz, Mother with her Dead Son (1937), World War II memorial, Neue Wache, Berlin

- Kaarina Kaikkonen (born 1952), Finland
- Reena Saini Kallat (born 1973), India
- Florence Brevoort Kane (1895–1956), United States
- Gertrude Farquharson Boyle Kanno (1876–1937), United States
- Bernadette Kanter (born 1950), France
- Lila Katzen (1925–1998), United States
- Kate Kelly (1882–1964), United States
- Flora Kendrick (1880–1969), United Kingdom
- Rachel Khedoori (born 1964, Australia), United States
- Bharti Kher (born 1969), India
- Inge King (1915–2016), Australia
- Theo Alice Ruggles Kitson (1871–1932), United States
- Elle Klarskov Jørgensen (born 1958), Denmark
- Lorena Kloosterboer (born 1962), Netherlands
- Rachel Kneebone (born 1973), United Kingdom
- Grace Knowlton (1932–2020), United States
- Katarzyna Kobro (1898–1951), Poland
- Eva Koch (born 1953), Denmark
- Kiki Kogelnik (1935–1997), Austria
- Ida Kohlmeyer (1912–1997), United States
- Meeli Kõiva (born 1960), Estonia
- Kristina Koljaka (1916–2005), Albania
- Käthe Kollwitz (1867–1945), Germany
- Margit Kovács (1902–1977), Hungary
- Louise Kramer (1923–2020), United States
- Yayoi Kusama (草間彌生, 1929–2026), Japan
- Kyung-hee Hong (홍경희, born 1954), South Korea

== L ==
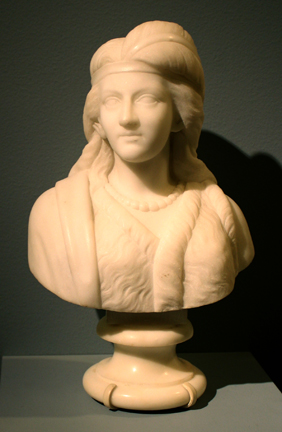
Edmonia Lewis, Minnehaha (1868)

- Rachel Lachowicz (born 1964), United States
- Anna Coleman Ladd (1878–1939), United States
- Marie-Jo Lafontaine (born 1945), Belgium
- Lili Lakich (born 1944), United States
- Karen LaMonte (born 1967), United States
- Gun Lanciai (1920–2013), Finland
- Sigalit Landau (born 1969), Israel
- Abigail Lane (born 1967), United Kingdom
- Cal Lane (born 1968), Canada
- Marta Lange (1903–1985), Latvia
- Greer Lankton (1958–1996), United States
- Liz Larner (born 1960), United States
- Carla Lavatelli (1928–2006), United States
- Mary Lawrence (Tonetti), (1868–1945), United States
- Louise Lawson (1860s – 1899), United States
- Sheila Lea (1901–1992), United Kingdom
- Molly Le Bas (1903–1996), United Kingdom
- Sarra Lebedeva (1892–1967), Russia
- Lee Bul (born 1964), South Korea
- Erica Lee (1888–1981), United Kingdom
- Maya Cohen Levy (born 1955), Israel
- Edmonia Lewis (c. 1844–1907), United States
- Alice Lindley-Millican (1885–1930), United Kingdom
- Doris Lindner (1896–1979), United Kingdom
- Jessie Lipscomb (1861–1952), United Kingdom
- Batia Lishansky (1900–1992), Israel
- Kirsten Lockenwitz (born 1932), Denmark
- Michelle Lopez (born 1970), United States
- Frances Loring (1887–1968), United States/Canada
- Lu Pin (陆频, born 1972), China
- Evelyn Beatrice Longman (1874–1954), United States
- Sarah Lucas (born 1962), United Kingdom
- Agnes Lunn (1850–1941), Denmark
- Gabriele von Lutzau (born 1954), Germany
- Norma Lyon (1929–2011), United States

== M ==
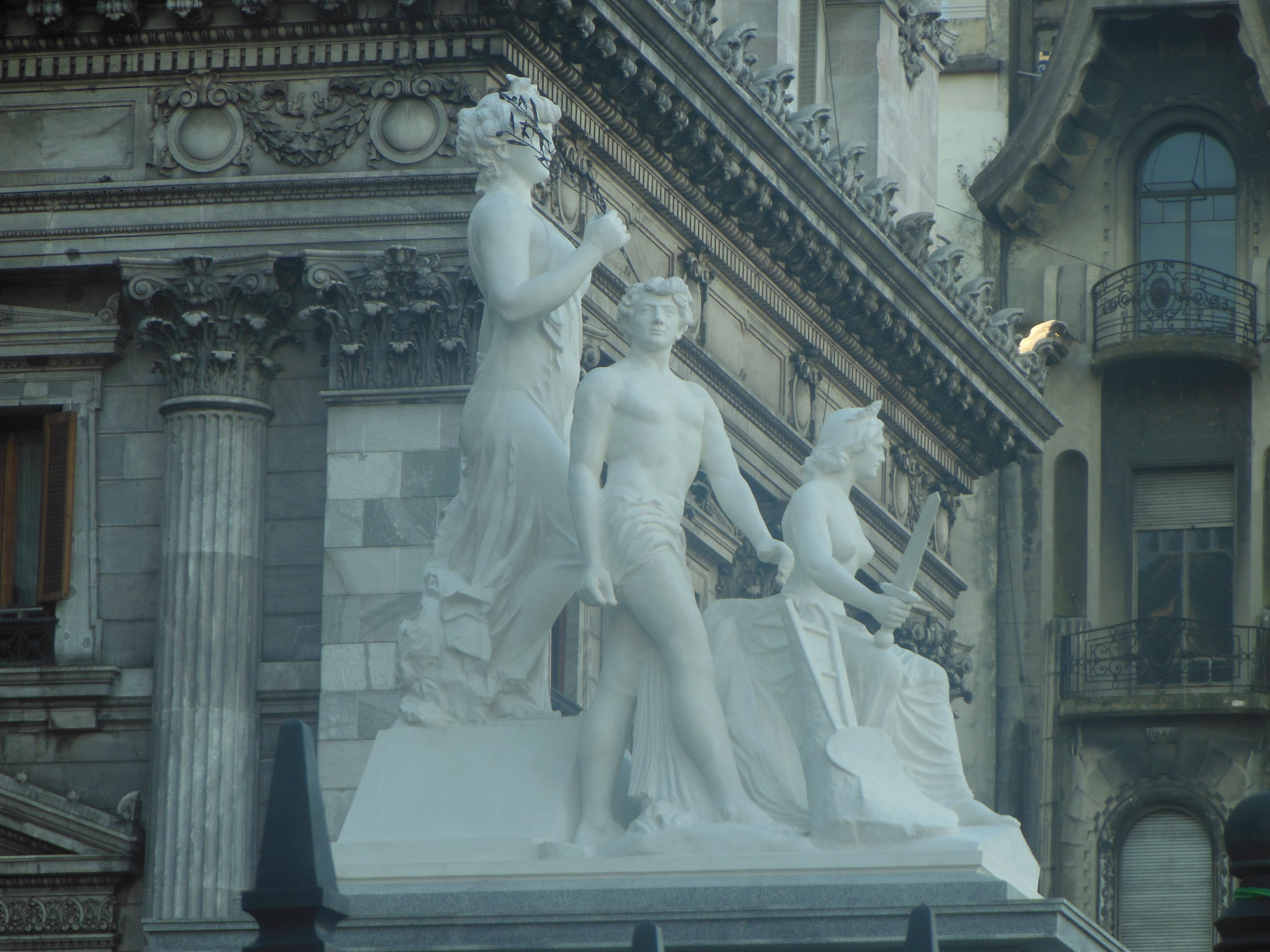
Lola Mora, La Justicia, el Trabajo y la Paz (1916, replica 2014), Palacio del Congreso Nacional, Buenos Aires, Argentina

- Molly Morell Macalister (1920–1969), New Zealand
- Helen Mackay (1897–1973), United Kingdom
- Jilma Madera (1915–2000), Cuba
- Marianne Maderna (born 1944), Austria
- Alice Maher (born 1956), Ireland
- Anna Mahler (1904–1988), Austria
- Edna Manley (1900–1987), Jamaica
- Elsie March (1884–1974) United Kingdom
- Teresa Margolles (born 1963) Mexico
- Maria Marshall (born 1966), United Kingdom/Switzerland
- Adéla Matasová (born 1940), Czech Republic
- Brigitte Matschinsky-Denninghoff (1923–2011), Germany
- Amanda Matthews (born 1968), United States
- Retta T. Matthews (1856–1899), United States
- Catherine Mawer (1803–1877), United Kingdom
- Charlotte Mayer (1929–2022), Czech Republic/United Kingdom
- Monique Mayère (born 1944), France
- Daphne Mayo (1895–1982), Australia
- Geraldine McCullough (1917–2008), United States
- Rooma Mehra (born 1967), India
- Dina Melicov (1905–1969), United States
- Ana Mendieta (1948–1985), Cuba/United States
- Anjolie Ela Menon (born 1940), India
- Geneva Mercer (1889–1984), United States
- Marisa Merz (1926–2019), Italy
- Annette Messager (born 1943), France
- Carol Miller (born 1933), Mexico/United States
- Marta Minujín (born 1943), Argentina
- Isabel Miramontes (born 1962), Spanish/Belgian
- Maggie Mitchell (1883–1953), United Kingdom
- Aiko Miyanaga (born 1974), Japan
- Marg Moll (1884–1977), Germany
- Cathy de Monchaux (born 1960), United Kingdom
- Adeline de Monseignat (born 1987), Monaco
- Esther Moore (1857–1934), United Kingdom
- Lola Mora (1866–1936), Argentina
- Polly Morgan (born 1980), United Kingdom
- Junko Mori (born 1974), Japan
- Hilda Grossman Morris (1911–1991), United States
- Jenny Mucchi-Wiegmann (1895–1969), Germany
- Vera Mukhina (1889–1953), Russia/Soviet Union
- Ethel Myers (1881–1960), United States

== N ==
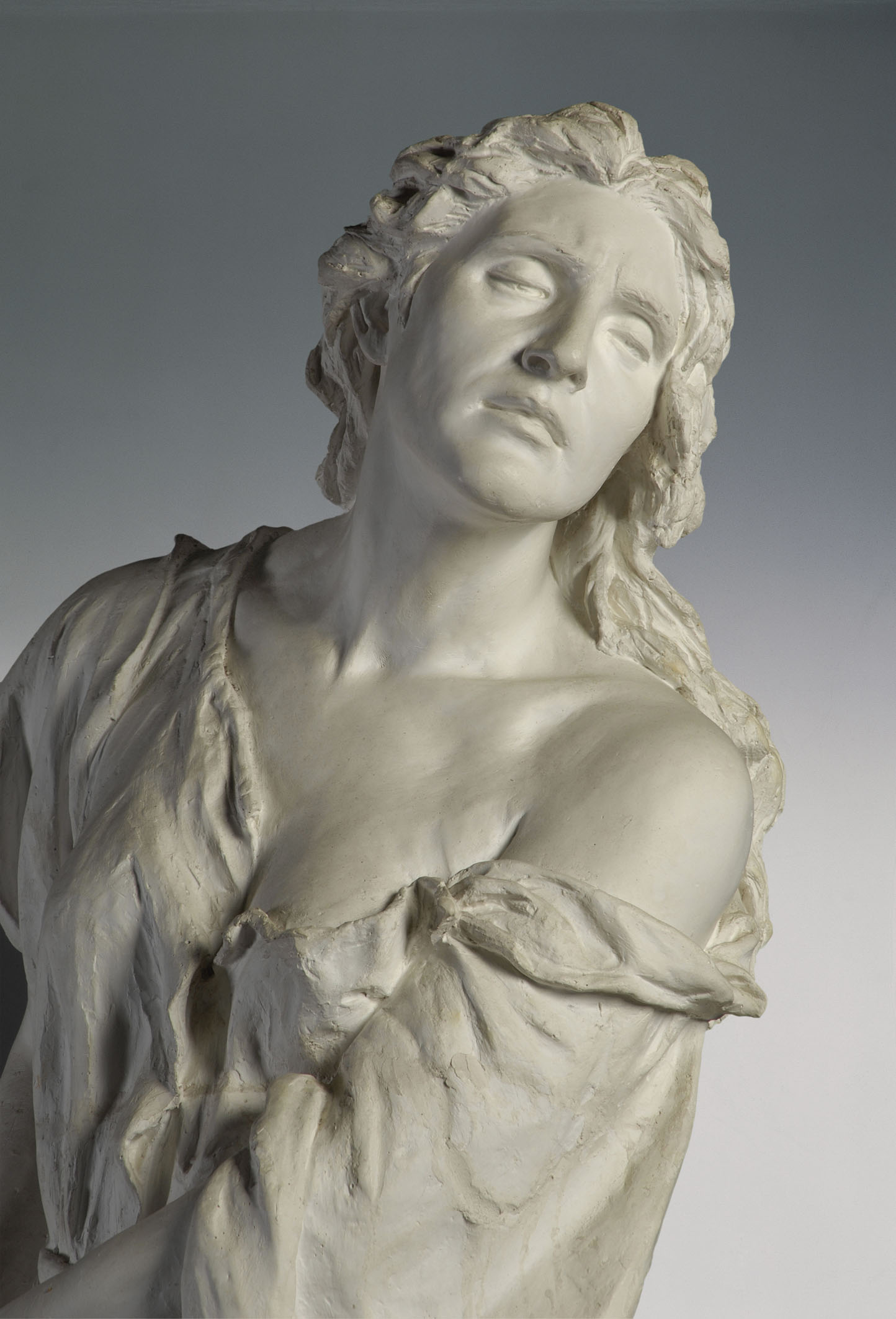
Elisabet Ney, Lady Macbeth (1905), Stadtmuseum Münster, Germany

- Fujiko Nakaya (中谷芙二子, born 1933), Japan
- Marlene Neubauer-Woerner (1918–2010), Germany
- Mariele Neudecker (born 1965), Germany/United Kingdom
- Louise Nevelson (1900–1988), United States
- Blanche Nevin (1841–1925), United States
- Avis Newman (born 1946), United Kingdom
- Elisabet Ney (1833–1907), Germany/United States
- Ida Göthilda Nilsson (1840–1920), Sweden
- Astrid Noack (1888–1954), Denmark
- Cady Noland (born 1956), United States
- Elizabeth Norton (1887–1985), United States
- Marina Núñez del Prado (1910–1995), Bolivia

== O ==
- Louise Ochsé (1884–1944), Belgium
- Katie Ohe (born 1937), Canada
- Yoko Ono (born 1933), United States
- Méret Oppenheim (1913–1985), Germany
- Chana Orloff (1888–1968), Israel
- Lucy Orta (born 1966), United Kingdom
- Kirsten Ortwed (born 1948), Denmark
- Adrienne Outlaw (born 1970), United States

== P ==
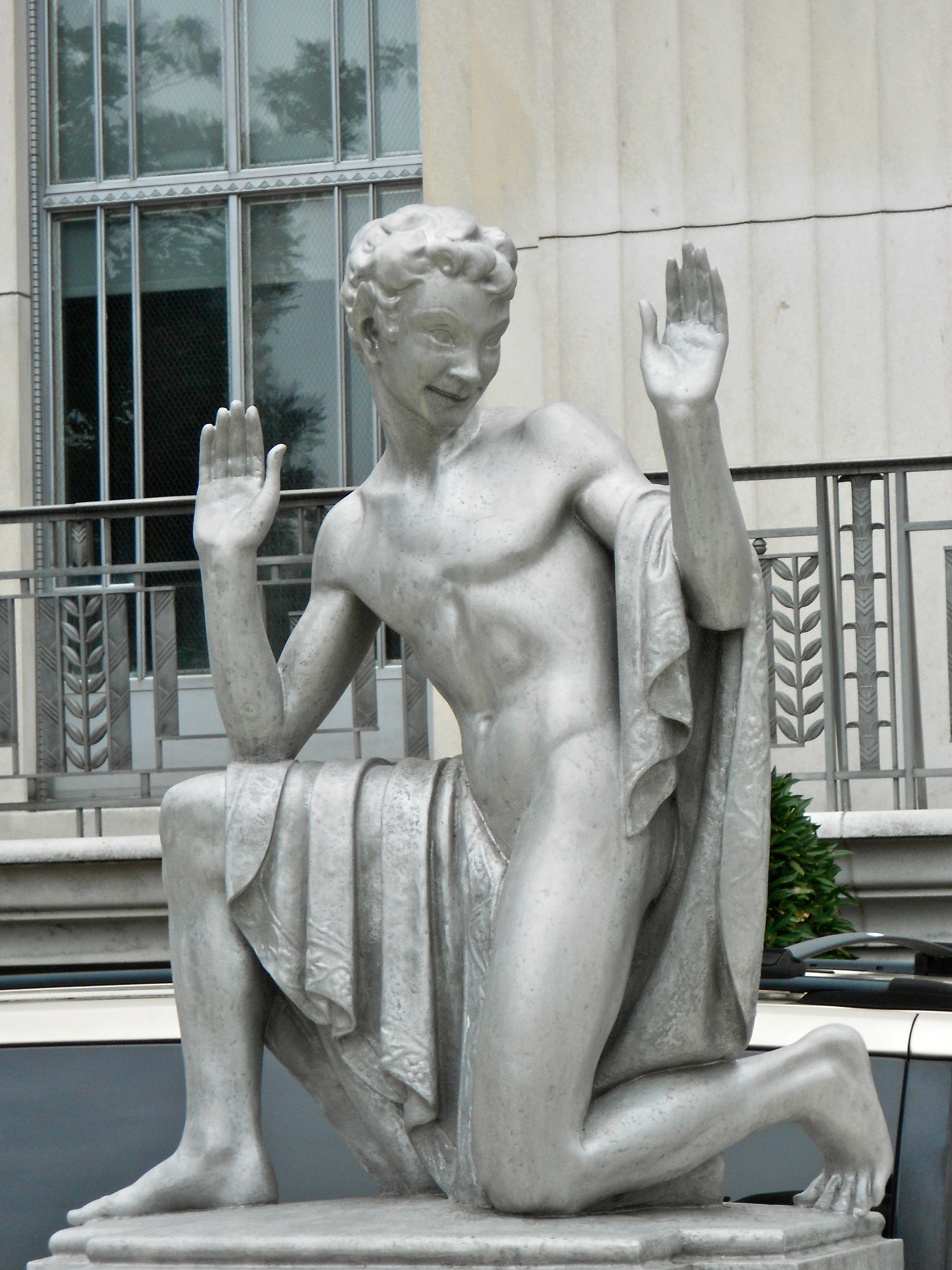
Brenda Putnam, Puck (1930-32, replica 2002), Folger Shakespeare Library, Washington, D.C.

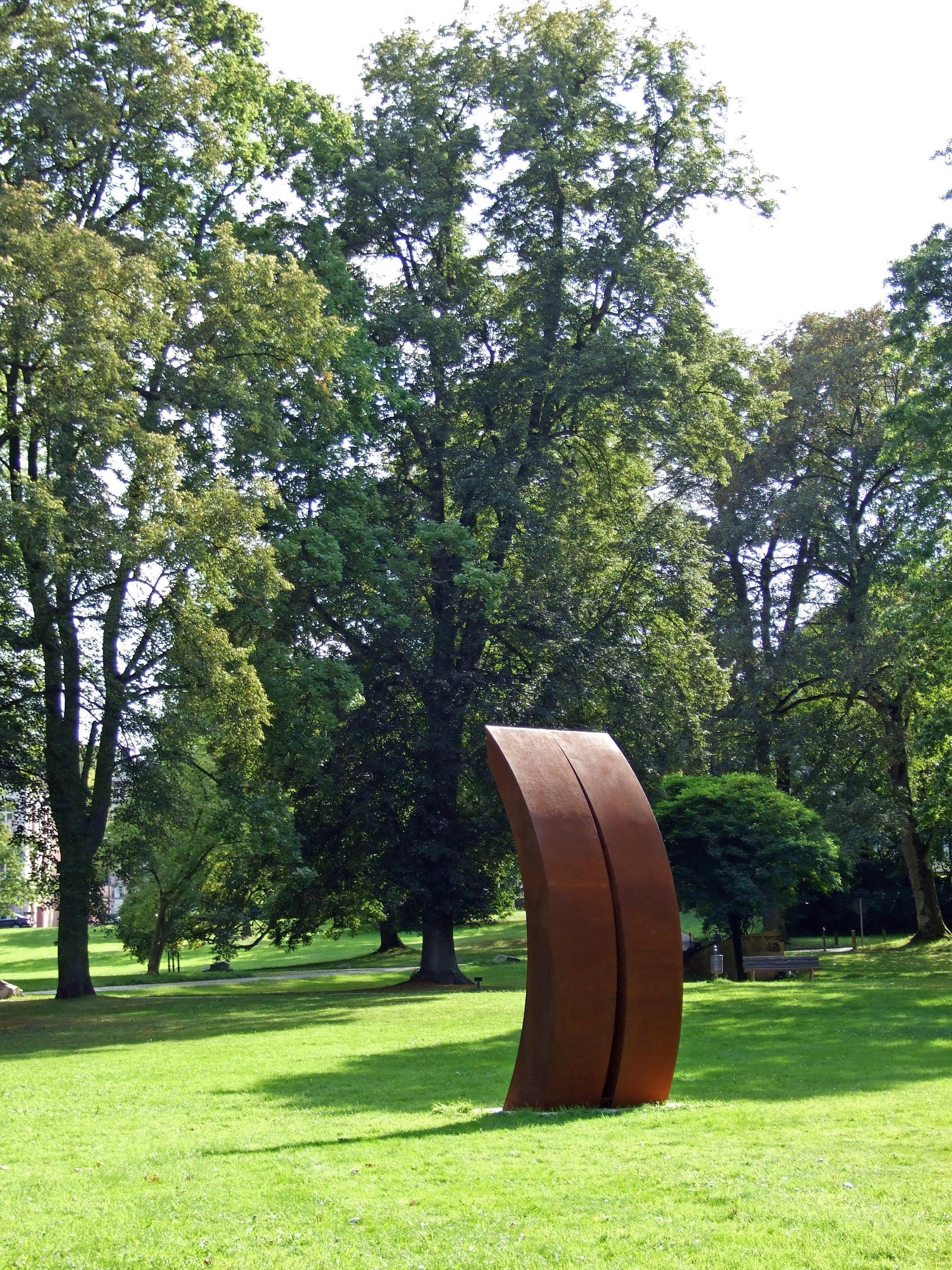
Beverly Pepper, Longo Monolith (2006), Bad Homburg, Hesse, Germany

- Ana Maria Pacheco (born 1943), Brazil
- Bashka Paeff (1894–1979), United States
- Marta Pan (1923–2008), France
- Kathleen Parbury (1901–1986), United Kingdom
- Constance-Anne Parker (1921–2016), United Kingdom
- Cornelia Parker (born 1956), United Kingdom
- Lilian Parker (1874–1947), United Kingdom
- Fiona Peever (born 1964), England
- Alicia Penalba (1913–1982), Argentina
- Beverly Pepper (1922–2020), United States
- Johanne Pedersen-Dan (1860–1934), Denmark
- Nielsine Petersen (1851–1916), Denmark
- Judy Pfaff (born 1946), London
- Liz Phillips (born 1951), United States
- Patricia Piccinini (born 1965), Australia
- Rona Pondick (born 1952), United States
- María Carmen Portela (1898–1983), Uruguay
- Charlotte Posenenske (1930–1985), Germany
- Marjetica Potrč (born 1953), Slovenia
- Etiyé Dimma Poulsen (born 1968), Ethiopia
- Susan Mohl Powers (1944–2023), United States
- Angela Haseltine Pozzi (born 1957), United States
- Katherine T. Hooper Prescott (1851–1926), United States
- Nancy Elizabeth Prophet (1890–1960), United States
- Laila Pullinen (1933–2015), Finland
- Brenda Putnam (1890–1975), United States

== R ==
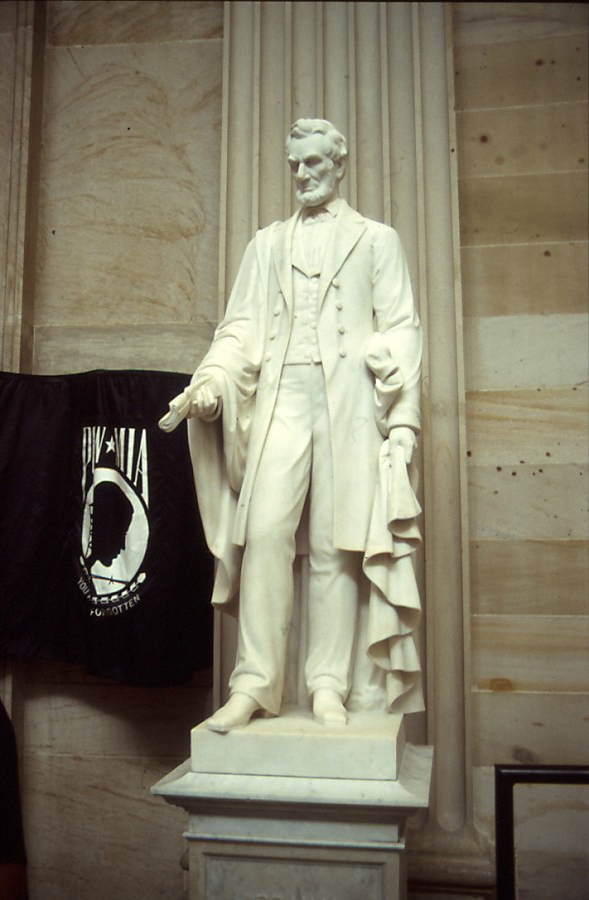
Vinnie Ream, Abraham Lincoln (1871), United States Capitol, Washington, D.C.

- Rabarama (born 1969), Italy
- Dorothee Raetsch (born 1940), Germany
- Tanya Ragir (born 1955), United States
- Caroline Ramersdorfer (born 1960), Austria/United States
- Alma Ramsey (1907–1993), United Kingdom
- Antonietta Raphael (1895–1975), Italy
- Vinnie Ream (1847–1914), United States
- Hazel Reeves (born 1963)
- Essi Renvall (1911–1979), Finland
- Frances Rich (1910–2007), United States
- Myra Reynolds Richards (1882–1934), United States
- Germaine Richier (1902–1959), France
- Linda Ridgway (born 1947), United States
- Lise Ring (born 1936), Denmark
- Laura Rodig (1901–1972), Chile
- Emy Roeder (1890–1971), Germany
- Luisa Roldán (1652–1706), Spain
- Ellen Mary Rope (1855–1934), United Kingdom
- Ethel Rosenfield (1910–2000), Canada
- Properzia de' Rossi (c. 1490–1530), Italy
- Julie Rotblatt-Amrany (born 1958), United States
- Bonnie Rychlak (born 1951), United States
- Ursula von Rydingsvard (born 1942), Germany, United States
- Adolfine Mary Ryland (1903–1983), United Kingdom
- Marina Ryndzyunskaya (1877–1946), Russia

== S ==
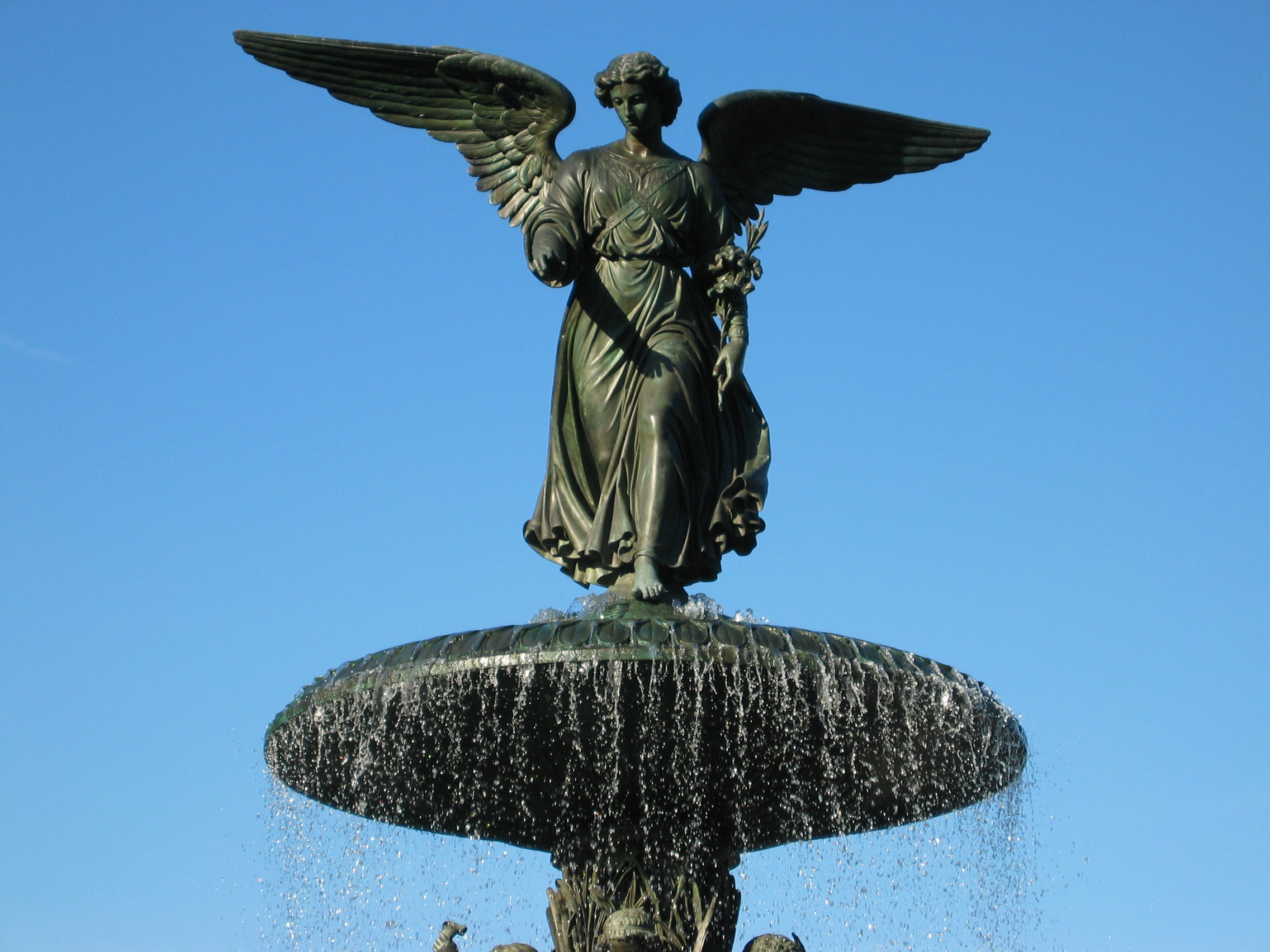
Emma Stebbins, Angel of the Waters (1873), Bethesda Terrace and Fountain, Central Park, New York City

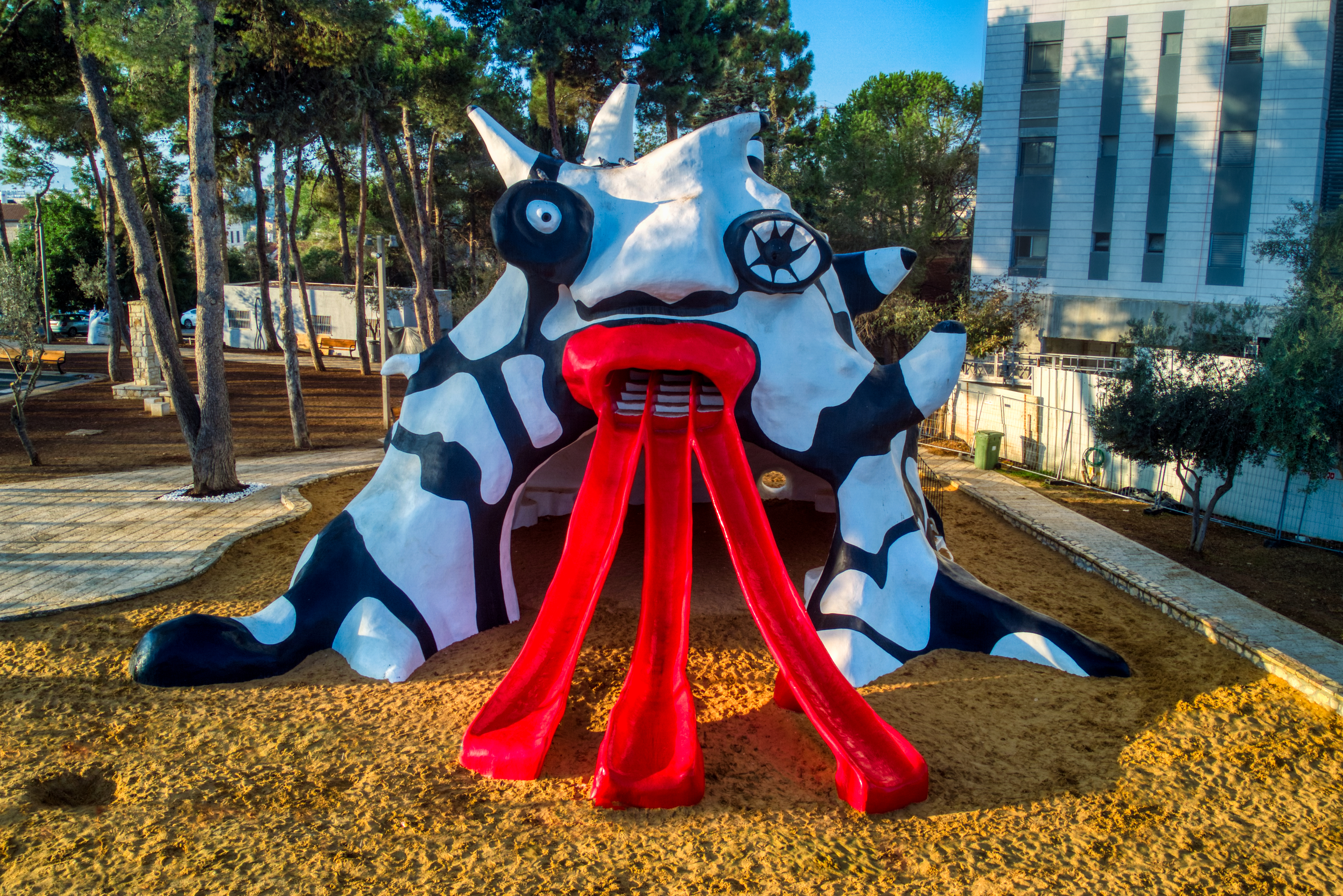
Niki de Saint-Phalle, The Golem (1971), Kiryat Hayovel, Israel

- Nína Sæmundsson (1892–1965), Iceland, United States
- Niki de Saint-Phalle (1930–2002), France
- Takako Saito (斉藤陽子, 1929–2025), Japan
- Doris Salcedo (born 1958), Colombia
- Augusta Savage (1892–1962), United States
- Erzsébet Schaár (1905–1975), Hungary
- Kathleen Scott (1878-1947), United Kingdom
- Ruth Schmidt Stockhausen (1922–2014), Germany
- Bettina Scholl-Sabbatini (born 1942), Luxembourg
- Belle Kinney Scholz (1890–1959), United States
- Helen Schou, (1905–2006), Denmark
- Barbara Schwartz (1949–2006), United States
- Janet Scudder (1869–1940), United States
- Davina Semo (born 1981), United States
- Maria Serebriakova (born 1965), Germany
- Yvonne Serruys (1873–1953), Belgium/France
- Judith Shea (born 1948), United States
- Kathleen Shillam (1916–2002), Australia
- Siona Shimshi (1939–2018), Israel
- Raphaele Shirley (born 1969), United States
- Alyson Shotz (born 1964), United States
- Jeanne Silverthorne (born 1950), United States
- Alice Louise Judd Simpich (1918–2006), United States
- Jane Simpson (born 1965), United Kingdom
- Lilian Simpson (c. 1871–1897), United Kingdom
- Renée Sintenis (1888–1965), Germany
- Marta Skulme (1890–1962), Latvia
- Kiki Smith (born 1954), United States
- Monika Sosnowska (born 1972), Poland
- A. B. S. Sprigge (1906–1980), United Kingdom
- Pia Stadtbäumer (born 1959), Germany
- Jonny Star (Gabriele-Maria Scheda), (born 1964), Germany
- Birgit Stauch (born 1961), Germany
- Emma Stebbins (1815–1882), United States
- Flora Steiger-Crawford (1899–1991), Switzerland
- Jana Sterbak (born 1955), Czechoslovakia/Canada
- Jessica Stockholder (born 1958), United States
- Renee Stout (born 1959), United States
- Marjorie Strider (1931–2014), United States
- Imogen Stuart (1927–2024), Ireland
- Michelle Stuart (born 1933), United States
- Roxanne Swentzell (born 1962), United States
- Stephanie Syjuco (born 1974), Philippines
- Alina Szapocznikow (1926–1973), Poland
- Sarah Sze (born 1969), United States
- Katharina Szelinski-Singer (1918–2010), Germany

== T ==
- Athena Tacha (born 1936), Greece, United States
- Sophie Taeuber-Arp (1889–1943), Switzerland
- Cheryl Tall (born 1946), United States
- Dorothy Tanner (1923–2020), United States
- Dorothea Tanning (1910–2012), United States
- Waldine Tauch (1892/4–1896), United States
- Barbara Austin Taylor (1891–1951), United Kingdom
- Wendy Taylor (born 1945), United Kingdom
- Hilda Theobald (1901–1985), United Kingdom
- Margaret Thomas (1842–1929), Australia
- Rebecca Tobey (born 1948), United States
- Ela To'omaga-Kaikilekofe (born 1969), New Zealand
- Þorbjörg Pálsdóttir (1919–2009), Iceland
- Mabel Torrey (1886–1974), United States
- Amy Toscani (born 1963), United States
- Elisabeth Toubro (born 1956), Denmark
- Rosemarie Trockel (born 1952), Germany
- Zoja Trofimiuk (born 1952), Australia
- Anne Truitt (1921–2004), United States
- Su-Mei Tse (born 1973), Luxembourg
- Susanne Tunn (born 1958), Germany
- Alison Turnbull (born 1956), United Kingdom
- Heather Tweed (born 1959), United Kingdom

== U ==
- Hema Upadhyay (1972–2015), India
- Francis Upritchard (born 1976), United Kingdom
- Aytsemnik Urartu (1899–1974), Armenia
- Ingunn Utsi (born 1948), Norwegian Sami

== V ==
- Marja Vallila (1950–2018), United States
- Coosje van Bruggen (1942–2009), Netherlands/United States
- Hanne Varming (1939–2022), Denmark
- Josefina de Vasconcellos (1904–2005), United Kingdom
- Cydra Vaux (1962–2013), United States
- Dorothy Venning (1885–1942), United Kingdom
- Mary Vieira (1927–2001), Brazil
- Bessie Potter Vonnoh (1872–1955), United States
- Ruth Vodicka (1921–1999), United States
- Joana Vasconcelos (born 1971), Portugal

== W ==
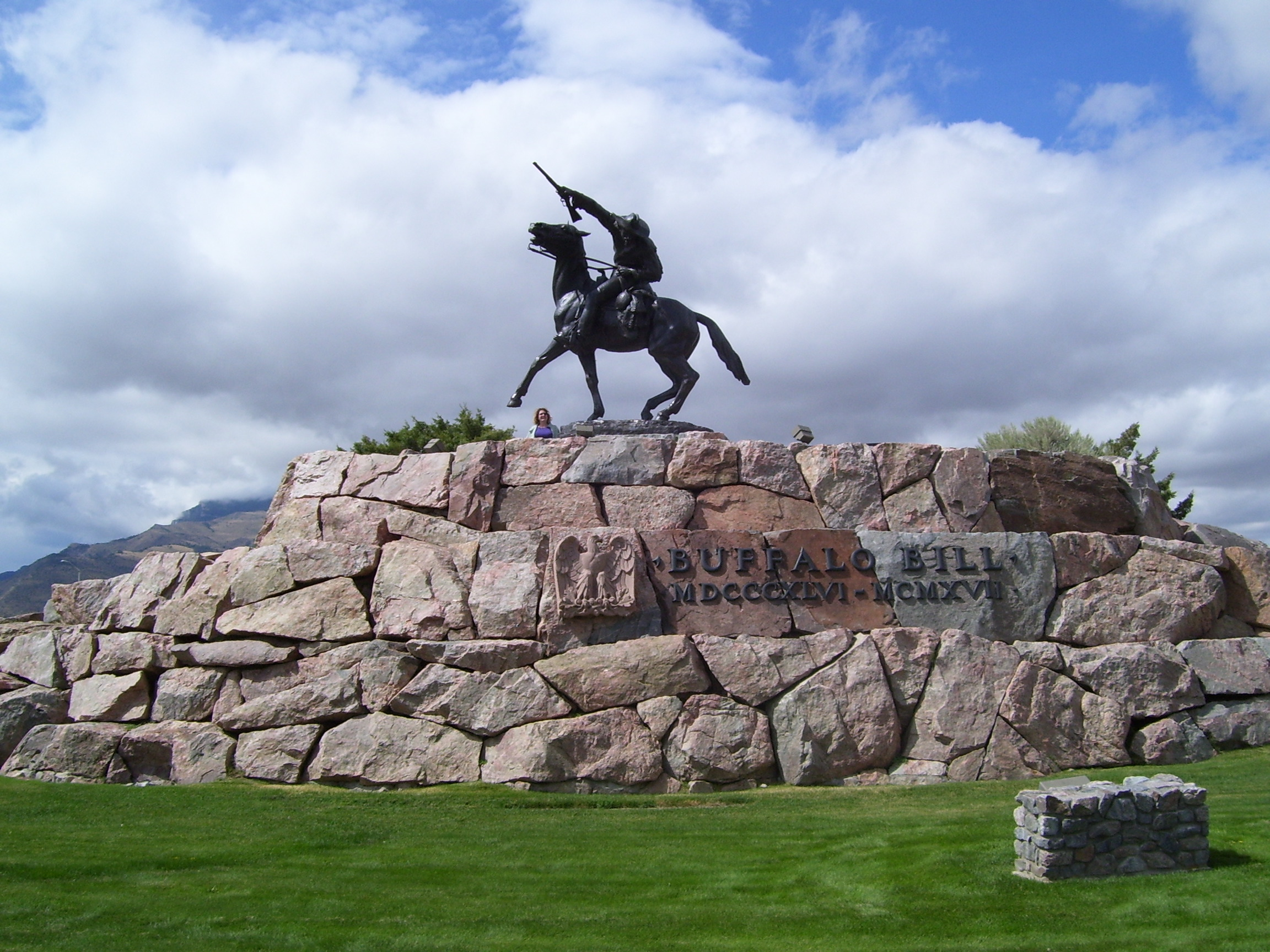
Gertrude Vanderbilt Whitney, Buffalo Bill - The Scout, 1924, commemorating Buffalo Bill Cody in Cody, Wyoming

- Lillian Wade (1870–1923), United Kingdom
- Olga Wagner (1873–1963), Denmark
- Sylvia Wald (1915–2011), United States
- Isabelle Waldberg (1911–1990), Switzerland
- Hilda Annetta Walker (1877–1960), United Kingdom
- Nellie Walker (1874–1973), United States
- Katherine Wallis (1861–1957), Canadian
- Marijke van Warmerdam (born 1959), Netherlands
- Mary Spencer Watson (1913–2006), United Kingdom
- Cecilia Webb (1888–1957), United Kingdom
- Mary Hortense Webster (1881–1965), United States
- Katharine Lane Weems (1899–1989), United States
- Barbara Westermann (born 1958), Germany
- Clara Westhoff (1875–1954), Germany
- Carmen Wenzel (born 1931), Mexico
- Erica White (1904–1991), United Kingdom
- Rachel Whiteread (born 1963), United Kingdom
- Anne Whitney (1821–1915), United States
- Gertrude Vanderbilt Whitney (1875–1942), United States
- Marguerite Wildenhain (1896–1985), United States
- Alison Wilding (born 1948), United Kingdom
- Hannah Wilke (1940–1993), United States
- Cathy Wilkes (born 1966), United Kingdom
- Lucy Gwendolen Williams (1870–1955), United Kingdom
- Anne Wilson (born 1949), United States
- Hermione Wiltshire (born 1963), United Kingdom
- Margaret Winser (1868–1944), United Kingdom
- Jacqueline Winsor (born 1941–2024), United States
- Faith Winter (1927–2017), United Kingdom
- Dorothy Stanton Wise (1879–1918), United Kingdom
- Lilli Wislicenus (1872–1939), Germany
- Elizabeth Wright (born 1964), United Kingdom
- Patience Wright (1725–1786), United States
- Elizabeth Wyn Wood (1901–1966), Canada
- Marysole Wörner Baz (1936–2014), Mexico
- Florence Wyle (1881–1968), United States, Canada

== Y ==
- Enid Yandell (1870–1934), United States
- Kennedy Yanko (born 1988), United States
- Melanie Yazzie (born 1966), United States
- Anicka Yi (born 1971), South Korea/United States
- Susan York (born 1951), United States
- Daisy Youngblood (born 1945), United States

== Z ==
- Valentina Zeïlé (born 1937), Latvia/France
- Paula Zima (born 1953), United States
- Andrea Zittel (born 1965), United States
- Astrid Zydower (1930–2005), Germany/United Kingdom

== See also ==
- List of female architects
- List of sculptors
