= Margarete Hoenerbach =

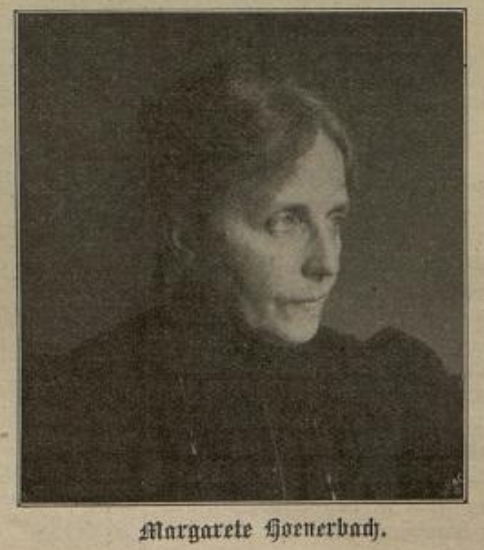
Margarete Hoenerbach (Der Bazar, 20 January 1908)

Margarete Hoenerbach (19 September 1848 – 1924) was a German painter, graphic artist, medallist, and sculptor.

== Life ==
Hoenerbach was born in Deutz, Cologne. She trained privately with Otto Rethel and Alfred Hertel in Düsseldorf and settled in Berlin after stays in Paris and Italy. She initially devoted herself to portrait, still life, and landscape painting.

In 1868, the drawing and painting school of the Verein der Berliner Künstlerinnen was founded as the first public institution where women received basic and systematic training in art. Women were not admitted to the art academy until 1919. In 1891, the association and the school established themselves as permanent institutions within the Berlin art scene with generous subsidies from the Prussian Ministry of Education. The Secessionists Philipp Franck, Hans Baluschek, Ludwig Dettmann, Martin Brandenburg, Ulrich Hübner, George Mosson, and Franz Skarbina was connected to the artists' association as a teacher at the drawing and painting school and as an honorary member.

Hoenerbach was appointed director from 1892 to 1909. Well-known students included Paula Modersohn-Becker in 1896, Ilse Jonas until 1909 and lecturers Jacob Alberts, Curt Stoeving, Martin Körte, Ernst Friedrich Hausmann, Ludwig Dettmann, Max Uth, Jeanna Bauck, and in 1897 Käthe Kollwitz.

From 1887 to 1911, she was represented with her work in the annual exhibitions of the Berlin Academy and in Munich. In the Allgemeine Kunstchronik Wien, Franz Hermann commented on her contribution to the 12th exhibition of the Association of Female Artists and Art Friends in 1890 in the Royal Academy building in Berlin:

A 'garden hall decoration' by Marg. Hönerbach suffers from overly strong emphasis on the decorative, whose great talent is revealed without contradiction in a miniature panel 'Vorrathskammer' that was also given. What Fraulein Hönerbach offers us in this barely hand-sized frame is incomparably higher than the gigantic proportions of the first picture of her. In this unpretentious little corner, executed in the finest way, there is a distribution of light, a solution of color contrasts, an atmosphere that all in all has a delightful effect.

In 1900 Hoenerbach participated with five pictures at the "Woman's Exhibition, 1900, Earl's Court, London, SW" with the address in Zehlendorf, Potsdamer Straße 39. In 1911, at the same address in the exhibition house, Potsdamerstraße 39, first Berlin jury-free exhibition: "You can also see good sculptures of women, they are based on Minne and Maillol, but still have their own life. The portrait study by Margarete Hoenerbach is excellent, [...]" ( Der Sturm)

An eye ailment led her from painting and graphics to sculpture. For the Technische Hochschule in Charlottenburg (now Technische Universität Berlin) she created the monument to the rector Guido Hauck and his tomb.

She died in 1924 in Berlin.

== Works ==
- In vino veritas (ram's skull with stuffed roemer, roses and grapes), 1886.
- Blessed are the pure in heart, oil on canvas, 72 × 58 cm; sign.ur: M. Hoenerbach 1896 (art trade 1987).

== See also ==
- List of female sculptors
