= Susanne Tunn =

German sculptor (born 1958)

Susanne Tunn (born 1958) is a German sculptor. She is well known for her big sculptures made from stone, but works as well in other natural materials such as tin, wood, concrete, plants or dust. Whether she is working with outsize or tiny formats, they always emit a strong physical effect.

== Biography ==
Born in Detmold (1958) she studied Art and Sociology at the University of Bielefeld. She lives in Alfhausen, near Osnabrück.

In 1998 she was awarded the Prize of the 350th anniversary of the Peace of Westphalia for her installation 166 beds – Peace and Noise, a site-specific sculpture in concrete and a sound installation.

Since 1992 she is lecturer in stone sculpture at the International Summer Academy of Fine Arts in Salzburg, Austria.

== Work ==
Her sculptures pay witness of her radical way of working: the material itself in its given form is a main focus throughout the working process. Another important focus is the site-relationship.

Some of her significant site-specific works are:

5 tables, 1989–2004, which include sculptures from stone and plants located in Germany (Table of Thinking), Spain (Table of the Desert), Sweden (Table of the Sea), Switzerland (The Mountain-Table), Romania (Table for two couples and a dog), the sculpture POL-Stein (made of stone) which is located in Bad Oeynhausen, Germany opposite an architectural work of Frank Gehry and set to be a contrast to it, and more recently the chapel of the Johannes Wesling Hospital at Minden (2004–2008), which is recognized as the first hospital chapel in Germany completely developed and built by a contemporary artist.

Her concern is more and more the conception and development of sculptural systems including material, form and site.

She has published books about several of her pieces of art. Being of high quality aesthetically (the book Im Inneren des Baumes, 1990, was awarded by the German Stiftung Buchkunst), these books can be considered as a literary expansion of her sculptural work.

=== Projects/Sculptures and permanent installations ===
- 2009–2011 The Key and A.D., two sculptures for COLOSSAL – Kunst Fakt Fiktion, exhibition of contemporary art in the light of the 2000th anniversary of the Varus Battle, Curator Jan Hoet, Kalkriese, Germany
- 2004–2008 Chapel, sculptural building of the chapel in the Johannes Wesling Hospital Minden, Germany
- 2004 Table for two Couples and a Dog, Freck/Avrig, Romania
- 2004 ATEM – META, Felix-Nussbaum-Haus/Kulturgeschichtliches Museum, installation on top of the roof of Villa Schlikker and in the Anette Röhr Gallery, Osnabrück, Germany
- 1999 The Mountain-Table, Alvier, Switzerland
- 1998 166 Betten – Peace and Noise, site specific sculpture and sound installation. Realisation for the art award on the occasion of the 350th anniversary of Peace of Westphalia, Hagen a.T.W., Germany
- 1996 Pole stone, sculptural installation in outside area of the Energie-Forum-Innovation by Frank Gehry, Bad Oeynhausen, Germany
- 1995 Table of the Sea, Skagerrak, Sweden
- 1992 Table of the Desert, Sierra de los Filabres, Spain
- 1989 Beginning of the project ›5 Tables‹. Table of Thinking, Minden, Germany

=== Selected solo exhibitions ===
- 2006 Perlen aus Stein, Lechner Museum Ingolstadt, Germany
- 2005 Tisch für zwei Paare und einen Hund /Table for two Couples and a Dog, Brukenthal Museum, Sibiu and park and old glass house of Brukenthal summer residence, Freck/Avrig, Romania
- 2022 Kraft der Stille, Lechner Museum Ingolstadt, Germany

=== Selected group exhibitions ===
- 2010 Unsichtbare Schatten Invisible shadows, Museum MARTa Herford
- 2009 Place of Memory – Place of Vision, Museo di Roma in Trastevere and Galleria Ugo Ferranti, Rome, Italy
- 2007 MARTa schweigt, Museum MARTa Herford, Germany
- 2005 (my private) Heroes, Museum MARTa Herford, Germany
- 2002 Aquaria. Über die außergewöhnliche Beziehung von Wasser und Mensch, Landesgalerie am Oberösterreichischen Landesmuseum Linz, Austria, und Kunstsammlungen Chemnitz, Chemnitz, Germany
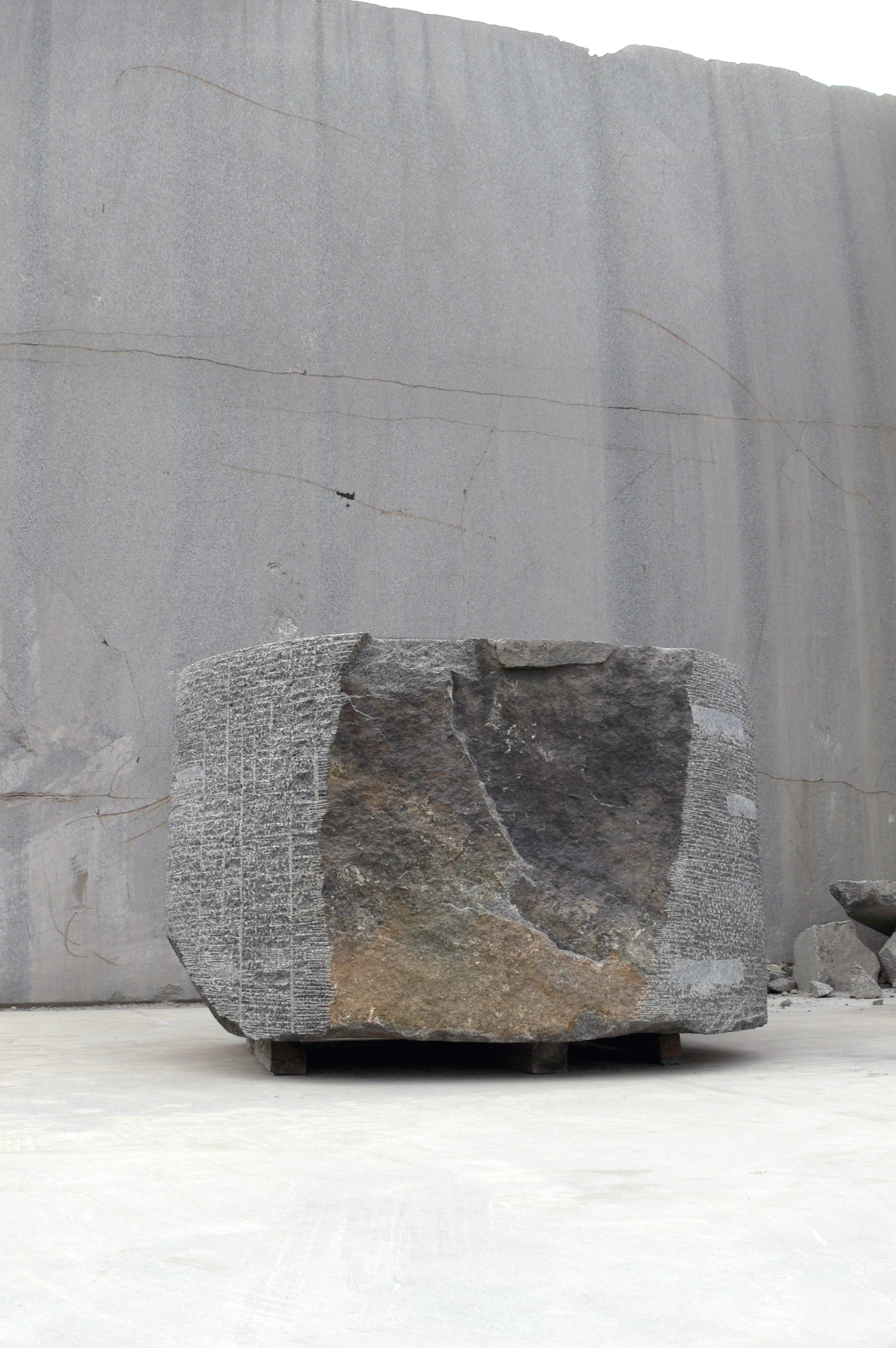
Rotation, 2012

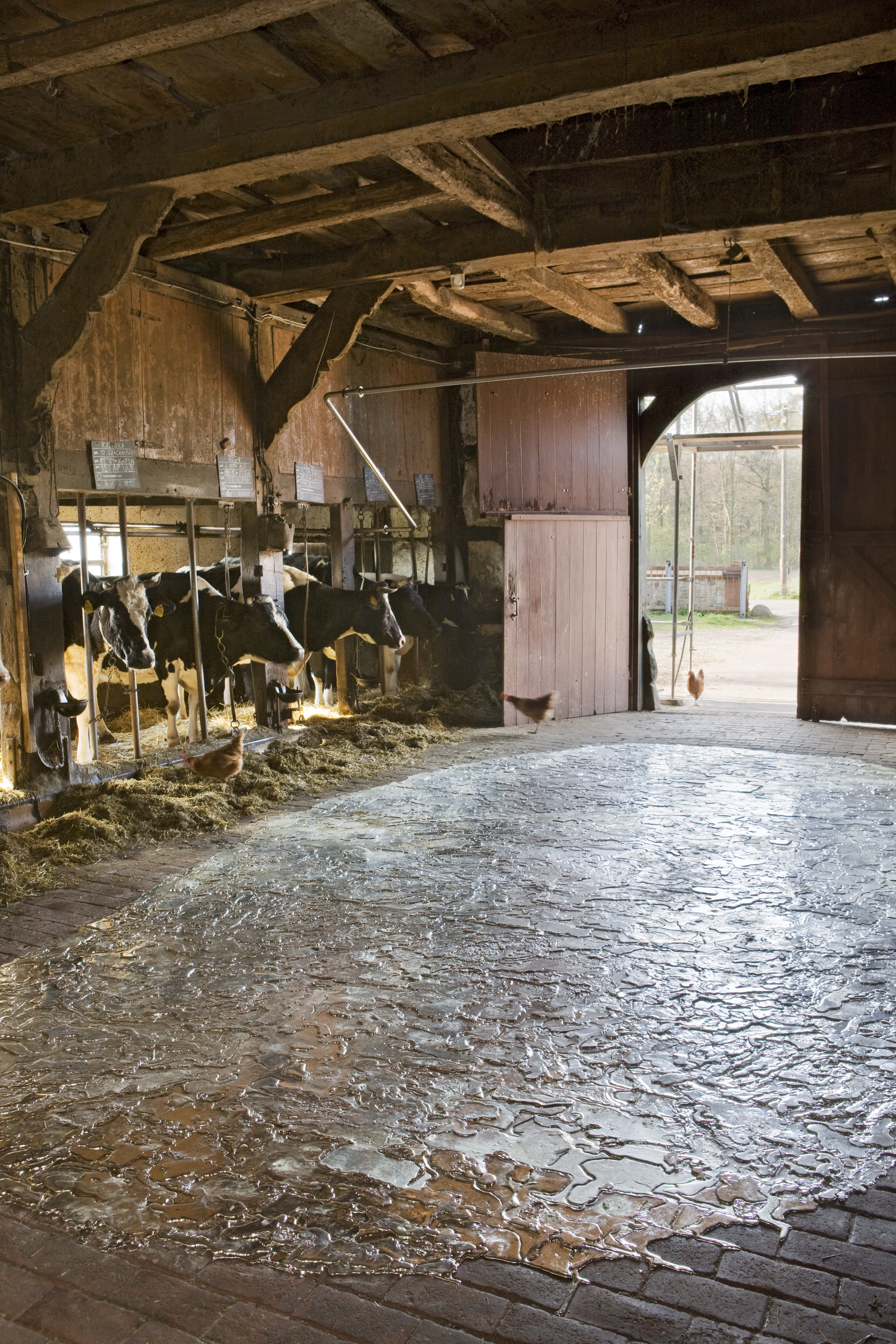
A.D., Zinnschüttung, 2009-2011

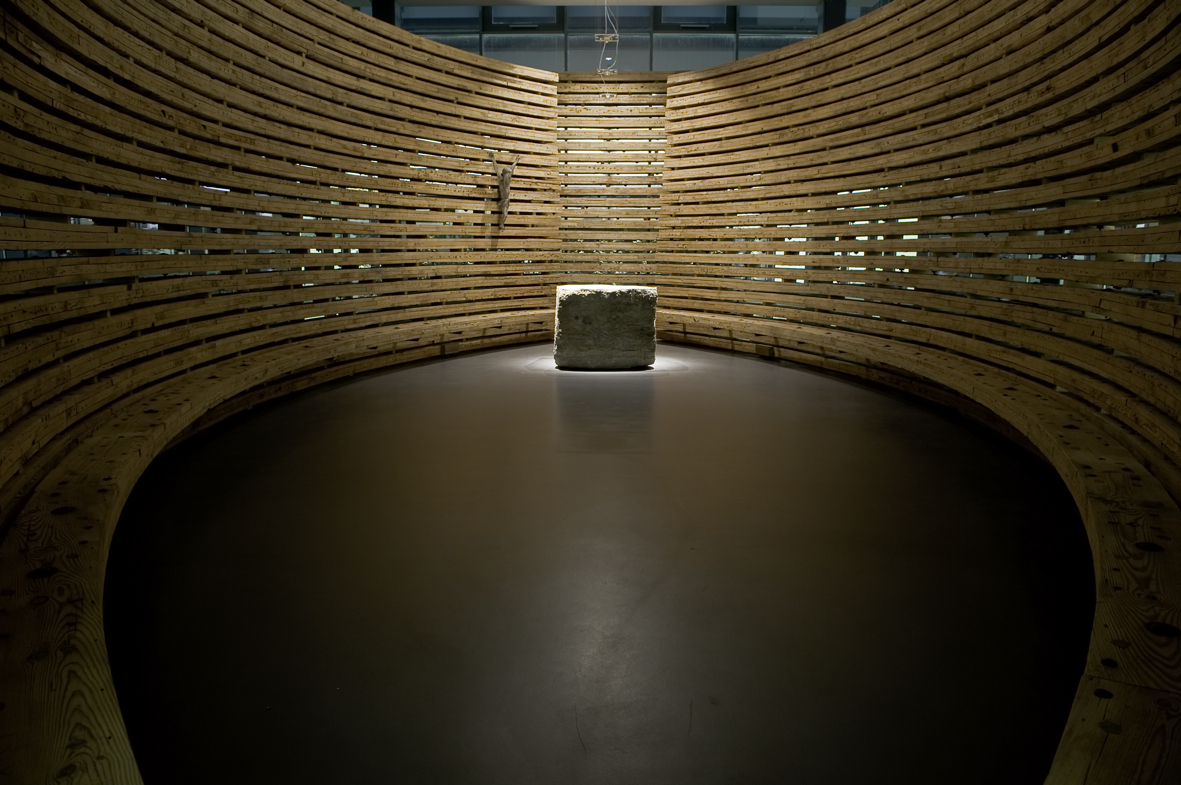
Kapelle Klinikum Minden, Innenraum, 2008

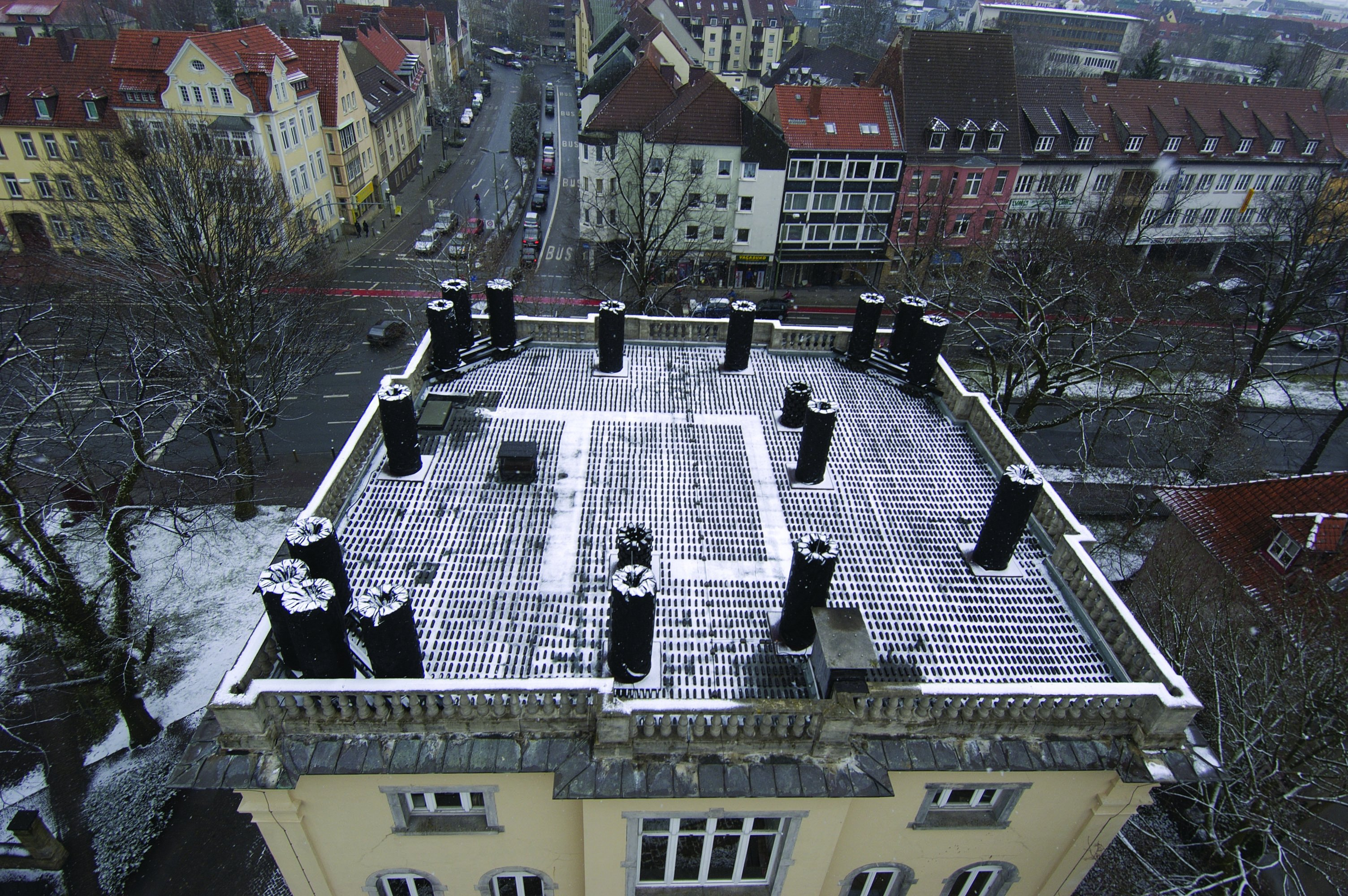
atem meta, Braunkohlebriketts, 2004, Installation auf dem Dach der Villa Schlikker

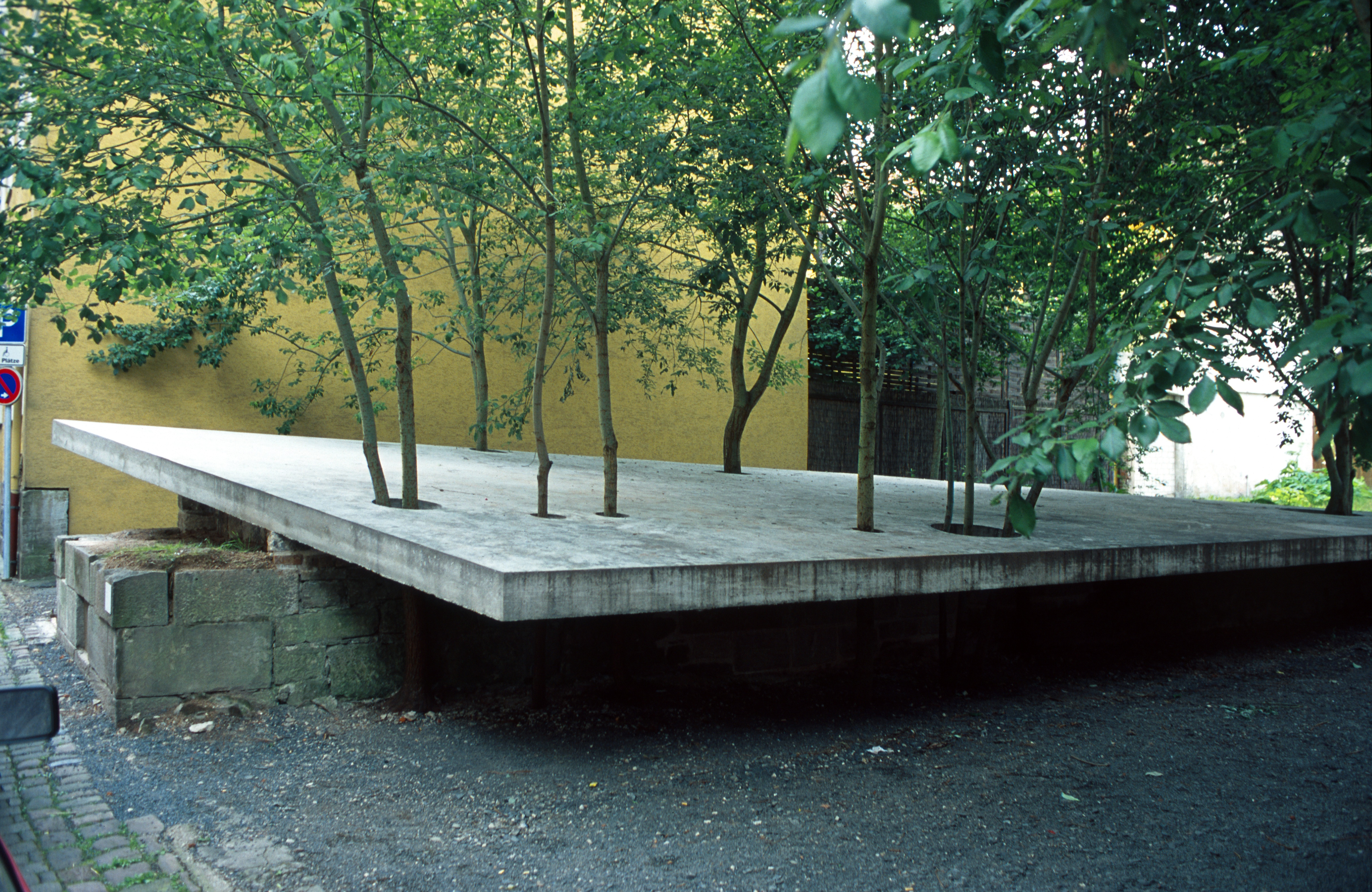
Loh, Skulptur, 2000

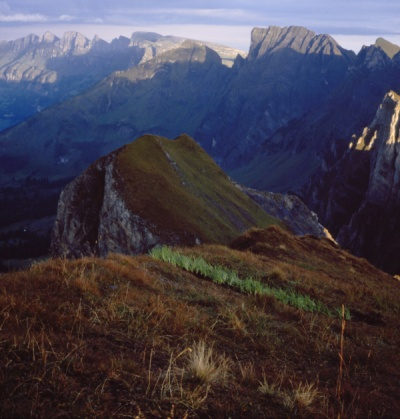
Tisch des Berges, 1999

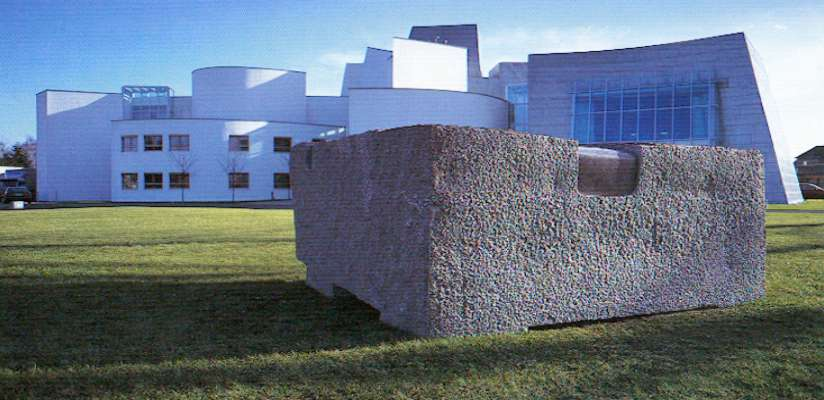
Pol-Stein, 1996

== Selected published works ==
- Susanne Tunn: Table for two Couples and a Dog, 2005, text by Liviana Dan, 16 pages, German/English/Romanian
- Susanne Tunn: ATEM – META, text by Philippe van Cauteren, photo: Christian Grovermann, 44 pages, German/English, 2004 Osnabrück
- Susanne Tunn: "(Chapel) 2004-2008", 27 colour prints, Photos by Peter Hübbe, text by Jan Hoet and Jörg Mertin, 56 pages, German/English, Kirchberg (Austria) 2008
- Susanne Tunn: Das Kongo-Syndrom, 1999, include a talk with Barbara Wally and Susanne Tunn40 pages, German/Englisch,
- Susanne Tunn: 166 Betten – Peace and Noise, 1998, Text by Jan Hoet, Nancy Spero, Leon Golub and Susanne Tunn, 48 pages, German/English
- Susanne Tunn: Tisch des Berges – The Mountain-Table, 2001, poem and text by Ilma Rakusa and Susanne Tunn, 16 pages, German/English
- Susanne Tunn: Tisch des Meeres – Table of the Sea, 1996, text by Dorothee von Windheim and Susanne Tunn, 18 pages, German/Englisch,
- Susanne Tunn: Tisch der Wüste – Mesa del Desierto – Table of the Desert, 1992, text by Barbara Wally, 16 pages, German/Spanish,
- Susanne Tunn: Tisch des Denkens – Table of Thinking, 1991, text by Ursula Blanchebarbe, 16 pages
- Susanne Tunn: Im Inneren des Baumes, 1990, text by Ursula Blanchebarbe and Volker Rodekamp, being awarded by Stiftung Buchkunst, Germany, 48 pages, German/Englisch

== Bibliography ==
- Unsichtbare Schatten – Bilder der Verunsicherung, Invisible Shadows, 2010, MARTa Herford, 216 pages, German/English
- Hellwach Gegenwärtig – Ausblicke auf die Sammlung MARTa, Contemporary alert – look in, look back, look ahead, Herford 2009, 156 pages, German/English
- Colossal, 2009, text by Jan Hoet, Stefan Lüddemann and Michael Kröger, 286 pages, German/English, Bad Iburg, Germany
- Andreas Mertin/Jörg Mertin: Religiöse Räume, Ta katoptrizomena, A Magazin for Art/Culture/Theology/Aesthetics, issue 54, www.theomag.de/54
- Jan Hoet: MARTa schweigt. Garde le silence, le silence te gardera, The Art of Silence from Duchamp to the Present. The Mystery of the Etruscans. 256 pages, German/English, MARTa Herford 2007
- 20 Jahre Steinbildhauersymposion, 208 pages, German/English, International Sommeracademy for Art, 2007, Salzburg, AT
- Sammlung Collection MARTa Herford 01, 124 Seiten, German/English, Herford 2006
- Jan Hoet: (my private) Heroes, 2005, 296 pages, MARTa Herford, Kerber Verlag
- Aquaria. Über die außergewöhnliche Beziehung von Wasser und Mensch, The Fascinating World of Man and Water, 319 pages, German/English, Linz 2002
- Sonsbeek 9, Lokus – Focus, 2001, Band 1 und 2, English/Netherlands, text and interview by Dieter Roelstraete, Arnhem 2001, NL
- 3 Räume – 3 Flüsse, Ihr wart ins Wasser eingeschrieben, 125 pages, volume 2, 2001 Hann. Münden
- Stadt(t)-art NRW, Kunst in 56 homöopathischen Dosen, Text by Peter Schmieder, 1997 Güterloh
