= Rachel Lee Hovnanian =

American artist

- Born: 1959 (age 66–67); Parkersburg, West Virginia, US
- Occupation: artist
- Website: rachelleehovnanian.com

Rachel Lee Hovnanian (born 1959) is an American conceptual artist whose work has been exhibited at the Baltimore Museum of Art. She focuses on themes of digital addiction and the pursuit of beauty and perfection.

== Education ==
Hovnanian completed a Bachelor of Fine Arts at the University of Texas at Austin in 1982. She then did postgraduate studies at Parsons School of Design. She moved to New York City shortly after graduating from art school.

== Work ==
Hovnanian works across sculpture, installation art, and painting. Her early pieces explored the themes of beauty and perfection. For example, according to Vogue, her 2009 exhibition Power and Burden of Beauty "featured a series of sculptures of beauty-queen trophies who had turned to substance abuse and homicide, and a swimsuit changing room with a warped funhouse mirror". Her 2010 show Too Good to be True also addressed beauty pageants.

Her 2018 three-part Women's Trilogy Project, according to Alessandra Codinha, was "the first time in recent memory that a single artist will have three sequential exhibitions in a New York gallery". The first part, NDD Immersion Room, "requir[ed] visitors to surrender their phones and spend time alone in a reproduction of a crepuscular forest". The second, Happy Hour, showed imagery of Girl Scouts and debutantes alongside Hovnanian's family photographs. The third, PURE, had dozens of oversized bars of Ivory soap carved in marble. In spring 2026, Nature Deficit Disorder was exhibited at the Baltimore Museum of Art.

Hovnanian's recent exhibition, Open Secrets, as well as other shows, have focused on human connection and isolation, particularly in the context of digital addiction, and the proliferation of technology in daily life. Open Secrets was the first solo exhibition at the Palazzo di Seravezza by a woman or an American. Other thematically similar works include Fuck My Life, My Battery is Dead, a mobile exhibit out of a three-wheeled Vespa Piaggio Ape truck, and Dinner for Two, a table setting where the only two guests appear via video monitors.

In 2022, she presented Angel's Listening, at a collateral event at the Centro Studi e Documentazione della Cultura Armena (CSDCA) held concurrently with the 59th Venice Biennale: it consisted of seven angels cast in bronze with their mouths taped shut. As part of the exhibition, viewers were invited to "write something they couldn't say or didn't say during COVID"; Hovnanian compiled those messages into a 2024 exhibition, You Are Not Alone, Angels Listening, in Pietrasanta, and published them as a book.

== Personal life ==
Rachel Robertson Lee was born in Parkersburg, West Virginia, in 1959. Her mother, Peg Lee, was a cooking school teacher and later director; her father, Edwy Lee, was a writer and professor of English. She was one of five children, with four brothers (one of whom drowned at age 2). After stints living in New York City and on an Ohio farm, the family moved to Houston in 1969.

Hovnanian is dyslexic and struggled with reading, but "art came very naturally to her". Her parents both painted and took her to visit abstract expressionists of their acquaintance.

She married Ara K. Hovnanian in Dallas, Texas, on February 23, 1985. They had sons Alton and Alexander and daughter Serena. The family lived near Red Bank, New Jersey. Alton was killed in 2002, aged 15, in a boating accident.

Hovnanian keeps a top-floor apartment in a Venice palazzo where she lives part of the year.
