= Ruth Vodicka =

American sculptor (1921–99)

Ruth Chai Vodicka (November 23, 1921 – March 24, 1999) was an American sculptor.

An alumna of the Sculpture Center and of the City College of New York, Vodicka began working in welded metal in the 1950s. Early in her career she would repair items with her welder's torch in order to afford more art supplies. She was also a member of the Sculptors Guild. Vodicka donated a collection of her papers to the Archives of American Art at the Smithsonian Institution in 1977. Vodicka died in March 1999 at the age of 77.
