= Mary Hortense Webster =

British artist

- Born: 1881
- Died: 1965 (aged 83–84)
- Education: Art Academy of Cincinnati
- Known for: Sculpture

Mary Hortense Webster (1881–1965) was an American sculptor.

== Biography ==
Webster had instruction as a painter at the Art Academy of Cincinnati with Barnhorn and Nowattny, the Académie Julian in Paris, Verlet, Waldmann, Paris, with George Hitchcock in the Netherlands, and Charles Hawthorne in Provincetown, Massachusetts. Afterwards, she decided to focus on sculpture as her specialty. Webster trained under the distinguished American portrait sculptor Lorado Taft at the Art Institute of Chicago, the city in which she eventually settled. She also worked as Taft's assistant and secretary at his Midway Studios in Chicago. Webster was a native to Oberlin, Ohio and one of the early members of the Women's Art Club of Cleveland. Webster also took classes at Oberlin College for drawing and painting.

Webster was best known for painting and sculpture. Within these mediums, her main subjects were portraits, busts, and sculptures. She was most active in Chicago, Illinois, and Portland, Ohio. She was also a teacher in Lock Haven, Pennsylvania; Owatonna, Minnesota (1907–1910); and was Head of the Art Department in Portland Art Museum Schools (1910–1913). Webster was mentioned in 1921 in The American Magazine of Art for upholding high standards.

In the gallery of Cordon in 1965, Webster's sculpture had an honored place in the exhibition of work of member artists with an "In Memorium" art tea. She was the president of the Cordon at the time of her death in January. The guest speaker at this event was Harold Haydon who was associate professor of art at the University of Chicago and director of the Midway studios.

== Works ==
Sculpture of Horace Mann (Created between 1905 and 1936)

- Dimensions 125.6 cm x 95 cm x 5 cm
- Medium- Gilt Plaster
- Current Owner: Stanford University-Dispersed Art Collection

With her instructor, Taft (1860 - 1936), she created a sculpture of the well known American politician.

Portrait of Mrs. Forest Bidwell (1916)

- Featured in the Catalogue of the One Hundred and Eleventh Annual Exhibition of the Pennsylvania Academy of the Fine Arts (February 6, 1916- March 26, 1916)
- At this time, she lived at 51 South Professor Street, Oberlin, Ohio.

== Exhibitions and collections ==
A list of her exhibitions and collections can be found here on the Illinois Women Artists Project page:

- Paris Salon of 1906
- Cincinnati Museum, Ohio, 1916
- The 111th Annual Exhibition of the Pennsylvania Academy of Fine Arts, Philadelphia, 1916
- A six-time contributor to the Annual Exhibition of Works by Chicago and Vicinity Artists, Art Institute of Chicago (AIC), 1918–32,
- Annual Exhibition of Oil Paintings & Sculpture by American Artists, AIC, 1924
- Lorado Taft, Krannert Art Museum, University of Illinois at Urbana-Champaign, 1982
