= Madeleine Boschan =

German artist

Madeleine Boschan (born 1979) is a German sculptor and visual artist. She lives and works in Berlin, Germany.

== Life ==
Madeleine Boschan studied at the Hochschule für Bildende Künste Braunschweig from 2000 to 2006 and at the École Supérieure d’Art et Design du Havre in 2002.

Her work has been presented in numerous solo and group exhibitions in Europe and North America, including at Hamburger Bahnhof in Berlin, Kunstmuseum Wolfsburg, Weserburg – Museum für moderne Kunst in Bremen, Stedelijk Museum in Ypres, Museo di Santa Giulia in Brescia, Marc Straus Gallery in New York, Mercedes-Benz Museum, Stuttgart , Museum für Konkrete Kunst Ingolstadt and Art Center Los Angeles. Her works are held in public and private collections including the Mercedes-Benz Art Collection, Philara – Sammlung zeitgenössischer Kunst in Düsseldorf, the Tiroler Landesmuseum Ferdinandeum, and the Galerie Stadt Sindelfingen.

In 2018, Boschan was awarded first prize for an art-in-architecture project at the Institute of Quantum Physics and Biosciences at Ulm University.

== About ==
Boschan conceives of space as a structure of relationships. Her work explores how spatial relations shift, condense and realign through sculptural, painterly and drawn interventions. Her works are developed in response to the specific conditions of a place or situation and engage the movement, perception and physical presence of the viewer.

Over the course of her practice, Boschan has developed an interest in spatial transitions and passages as well as in forms of enclosure and dwelling. Her sculptures negotiate openness and enclosure, proximity and distance. Her wall paintings respond to existing proportions, sightlines and architectural structures, while her drawings introduce moments of pause and concentrated perception within exhibition spaces.

Sculpture, wall painting and drawing are distinct but related articulations of the same spatial thinking. Across these media, Boschan develops spatial constellations that direct the gaze, organise movement and intensify attention. Her practice includes sculptures and installations, site-specific interventions, wall paintings and permanent works in public and architectural contexts.

== Solo exhibitions ==
- 2026 Ouf - Ausstellungsraum für Gegenwartskunst, Düsseldorf
- 2025 Galerie Bernd Kugler, Innsbruck, Austria
- 2024 Oberpfälzer Künstlerhaus, Kebbel Villa, Schwandorf
- 2023 Kunstverein Friedrichshafen, Friedrichshafen
- 2022 Kirche St. Getrud, Cologne, Galerie Bernd Kugler, Innsbruck, Austria
- 2019 Sunday-S Gallery, Copenhagen, Denmark / Galeria Maior, Palma de Mallorca, Spain / Galerie Bernd Kugler, Innsbruck, Austria
- 2017 Galerie Lange und Pult, Zurich, Switzerland / Collectors Agenda, Vienna, Austria / Partance, Galerie Bernd Kugler, Innsbruck, Austria
- 2016 Hezi Cohen Gallery, Tel Aviv, Israel
- 2015 Escapement (with Andy Hope 1930), Neue Galerie Gladbeck, Germany / Galerie Bernd Kugler, Innsbruck / Herrenhaus Edenkoben, Germany / Larry, Berlin, Germany
- 2014 Technicolor: a) Feld, b) Fläche, Marburger Kunstverein, Marburg, Germany / Capri, Vitamin, Reutlingen, Germany / Deal with ´em, Jagla, Köln, Germany
- 2013 Closed Space Stories, Hezi Cohen Gallery, Tel Aviv, Israel / Don't you wonder sometimes 'bout sound and vision, Kunstverein Heppenheim, Heppenheim, Germany / Say a body. Where none. Say a place. Where none. For the body. To be in., Kunstverein Ulm, Ulm, Germany / Scope = immeasurable, Einraumhaus, Mannheim, Germany / Anwesenheit unerreichbarer Bezugspunkte, Galerie Bernd Kugler, Innsbruck, Austria
- 2012 An open Field, a Factory, a By-pass, Gloria, Berlin, Germany
- 2011 Kayfabe, Galerie Bernd Kugler, Innsbruck, Austria / Kwadrat, Berlin, Germany / Niteflix, Autocenter, Berlin, Germany
- 2010 Kalt, modern und teuer, Kwadrat, Berlin, Germany / Cosmic Camping, Appartement, Berlin, Germany

== Group exhibitions ==
- 2026 Galerie Bernd Kugler, Innsbruck
- 2025 Achim Freyer Kunsthaus, Berlin / LeBureau, Düsseldorf
- 2024 Galerie Bernd Kugler, Innsbruck / »daß die Göttin nicht himmelwärts, sondern herab nach ihren Freunden blickt«, Secci Gallery, Florenz / Salon Schmitz, Köln
- 2023 Die Welt ist noch auf einen Abend mein, Galería Ehrhardt Florez, Madrid / The future has an orange background, notforsale, Basel / James Choice, Galerie Bernd Kugler, Innsbruck / European Art Association, Berlin
- 2022 Moving in stereo, Mercedes-Benz Museum, Stuttgart, DE / Power!Light!, Kunstmuseum Wolfsburg / Die Schönheit von Combray, Galerie Bernd Kugler, Innsbruck / Entwürfe Kunst am Bau Stadtwerke Schorndorf
- 2021 Nothing in particular, Friedrichs Foundation, Weidingen, DE / Same Same but Different – Art from Germany and Austria, Galerie Crone, Vienna, AT / La renaissance de flâner, Galerie Bernd Kugler, Innsbruck, AT / 31: women. (Exhibition after Marcel Duchamp, 1943)., Daimler Art Collection, Berlin, DE
- 2020 31:women. (Exhibition after Marcel Duchamp, 1943)., Daimler Art Collection, Berlin, Berlin / Städtisches Museum Schloss Salder, Salzgitter Salzgitter / Galerie Bernd Kugler, Innsbruck, Austria Innsbruck
- 2019 some trees, Nino Mier Gallery, Los Angeles, Los Angeles / Comrades of time IV, Whatspace c/o Hardspace, Basel Basel / Avanti, Michael Horbach Stiftung, Cologne Cologne
- 2018 Junge Kunst / Junge Künstler, Skulpturenpark Heidelberg, Heidelberg / Light in / as image, Daimler Art Collection Stuttgart-Möhringen
- 2017 Galerie Lange + Pult, Zurich, Switzerland / Marc Strauss Gallery New York City, US / Modern sculpture, Galería Casado Santapau, Madrid, Spain / Weserburg | Museum für Moderne Kunst, Bremen / Berlin-Klondyke, Umetnostna Galereija Maribor, Maribor, Slowenia / Abbot Kinney, Venice, US / Galerie Bernd Kugler, Innsbruck, Austria
- 2016 Enea, Jona, Switzerland / Secession, Vienna, Austria / Kunsthaus Erfurt / Mirante, Vienna, Austria/ Galerie Bernd Kugler, Innsbruck, Austria
- 2015 Wo ist hier?# 2: Raum und Gegenwart, Kunstverein Reutlingen, Germany / Enea, Jona, Switzerland / Galerija Contra, Zagreb, Slovenia / Stedelijk Museum, Ypres, Belgium / Geisberg, Berlin, Germany / Salon Dahlmann, Berlin, Germany / Kulturforum Altenkamp, Schloss Holte–Stukenbrock, Germany / Caritatis, Semperdepot, Vienna, Austria
- 2014 Galerie Klaus Gerrit Friese, Stuttgart, Germany / Galerie Börgmann, Mönchengladbach, Germany / Kunstraum Kreuzberg / Bethanien, Berlin, Germany
- 2013 Hipp Halle, Gmunden, Austria / Novecento mai visto. Highlights from the Daimler Art Collection. From Albers to Warhol to now, Museo di Santa Giulia, Brescia, Italy / The Legend of the Shelves, Autocenter, Berlin, Germany
- 2012 Accelerating toward Apocalypse (Private / Corporate VII), Daimler Contemporary, Berlin, Germany / Gare de l'Est, Esslinger Kunstverein, Villa Merkel, Esslingen, Germany / En désordre, Philara – Sammlung zeitgenössischer Kunst, Düsseldorf, Germany / Neuer Pfaffenhofener Kunstverein, Pfaffenhofen, Germany / Kwadrat, Berlin, Germany / Abstract confusion, Kunsthalle Erfurt, Erfurt, Germany / Status. Berlin (1), Künstlerhaus Bethanien, Berlin, Germany / Galerie Bernd Kugler, Innsbruck, Austria / Eine Frau, ein Baum, eine Kuh, Museum für Konkrete Kunst Ingolstadt, Ingolstadt, Germany
- 2011 Based in Berlin, Hamburger Bahnhof, Berlin, Germany / Berlin Klondyke, Art Center, Los Angeles / Synecdoche, Bourouina Gallery, Berlin, Germany / Abstract confusion, Kunstverein Ulm, Ulm, Germany

== Awards and residencies ==
- 2027: Artist in Residence, AIR 101, Gmunden, Austria (upcoming)
- 2015: Artist in Residence, Herrenhaus Edenkoben, Germany
- 2014: Exhibition grant, Hessische Kulturstiftung, Germany
- 2011: Artist in Residence, Islington Mill, Manchester, United Kingdom
- 2018: First prize, art-in-architecture competition, Institute of Quantum Physics and Biosciences, Ulm University, Germany

== Selection of public and private collections ==
- Mercedes-Benz Art Collection, Stuttgart, Germany
- Philara – Sammlung zeitgenössischer Kunst, Düsseldorf, Germany
- Tiroler Landesmuseum Ferdinandeum, Innsbruck, Austria
- Galerie Stadt Sindelfingen, Germany
- Wurlitzer Collection
