= Cheryl Tall =

American visual artist (born 1946)

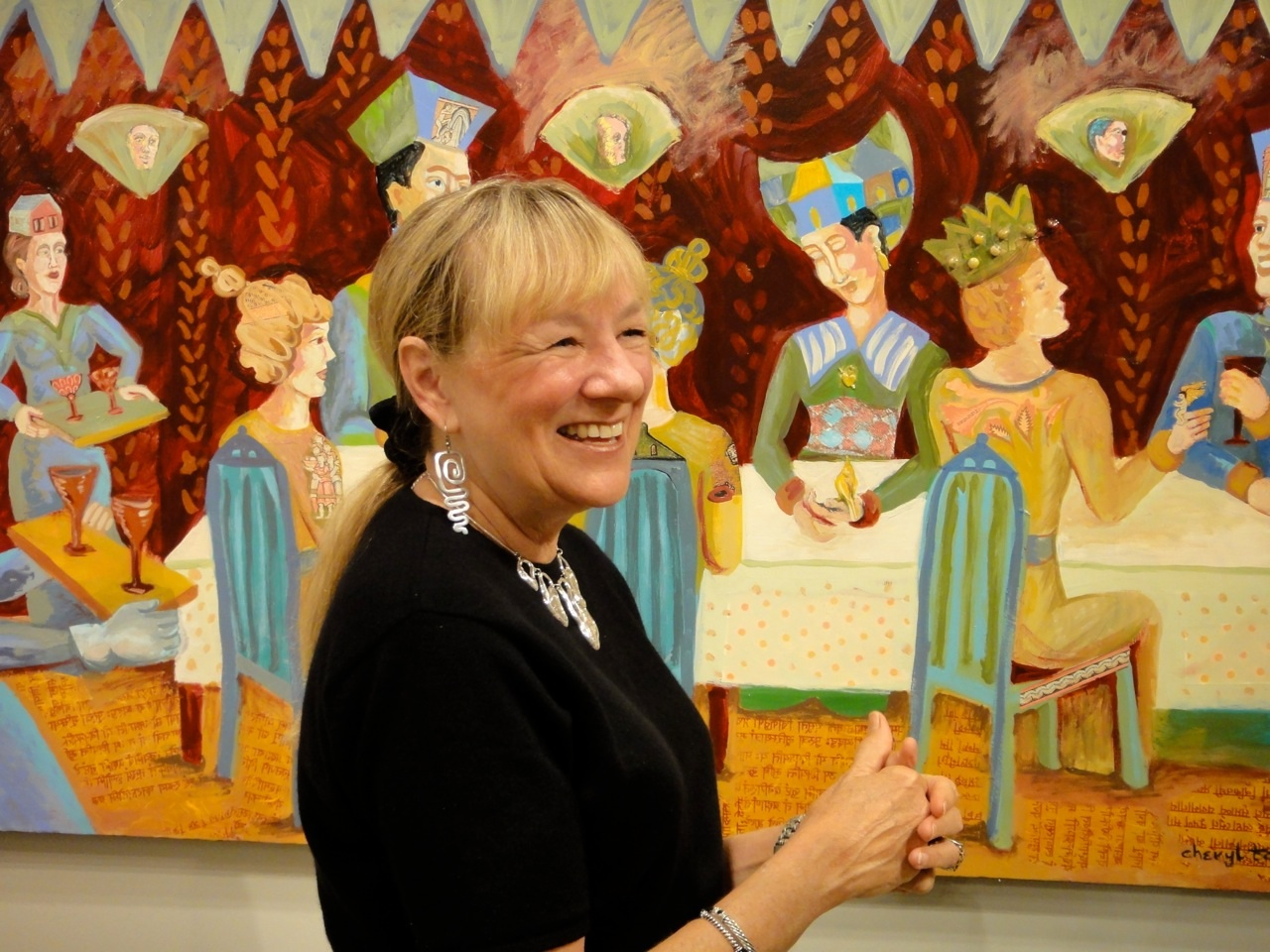
- Cheryl Tall in front of her works.
- Born: Cheryl Tall; 1946 (age 79–80)
- Occupations: Sculptor, artist
- Style: Figurative
- Website: www.cheryltall.com

Cheryl Tall (born in New Jersey in 1946) is an American visual artist whose work is primarily in the medium of sculpture and large wall installations in addition to, mixed-media, oil and acrylic painting. Tall is most notable for her intricate sculptures and her works have been in prominent and private collections all over the world. She has an MFA from the University of Miami and her present art studio is in Leucadia, CA.

== Work ==
Tall's primary medium is clay, coil built into large figurative sculptures and larger wall installations. Her work focuses on the relationships between people and their surroundings while her subject matters often include architectural and figurative elements. Tall likes to use references from classical mythology to portray archetypal situations. Ripe goddess figures combined with tree forms and animal shapes, expressing her desire for the harmonious existence of human beings with each other and with nature. While many of these images are inspired by personal experiences, she feels that the viewer can find himself in them.

Tall's work has been described as,"Togetherness and apartness. As an expression of duality, many of her works portray two or more figures in close proximity, sometimes with two heads that seem to come from the same body. She effects co-joining as a visual means to explore the tensions and strengths inherent in close relationships."

Her work has been published in 20 books including; 500 Figures, 500 Animals, 500 Dolls, 500 Dolls II, 500 Vases, Confrontational Ceramics, Winged Manor, No More Starving Artists, Ceramics Today, American Art Collector, The ACGA Book, The Ceramic Design Book, Surface Design, Making Marks and Sole Purpose among others.

Tall has also been featured in magazines such as, Ceramic Monthly, Ceramics Art and Perception, Clay Times, Studio Potter, Pottery Making Illustrated, Sculptural Pursuit, and American Craft Magazine.

Her work can be seen in various museum collections both nationally and internationally and she has had exhibitions and residencies all over the world including, The Banff Centre for the Arts, Banff, Canada, the International Workshop of Ceramic Art, Tokoname, Japan; Greece, France, International Ceramic Studios, Kecskemét, Hungary; Ganjin Celadon Festival, Gangjin, Korea; Mexico, China, England, Watershed Center for Ceramic Arts, Newcastle, ME, and the United States.

== Influence ==
Tall's pieces tend to fuse storybook illustration with surrealism and medieval folk art. She deals with global issues by posing pop culture references against 12th century characters, portraying multiple figures in close proximity, while exploring the tensions and strengths inherent in today's society.

Influential artists for Tall include Robert Arneson, Shepard Fairey, Andy Goldsworthy, Viola Frey, Paul Klee, Giorgio de Chirico, Oskar Kokoschka and Giselbertus. She has also studied and been influenced by prominent clay artists such as Judy Moonelis, Christine Federighi, Paul Soldner, Patty Warishina, and Adrian Arleo.

== Teaching ==
Tall teaches two-day workshops at universities and museums all over the world. These workshops encompass her personal techniques in quick coil building and large scale sectional sculptures, glazing, and finishing. They are intended for intermediate to advanced students but she also takes time out to teach private classes for students of all levels in sculpting, clay and paint from her studio in Leucadia, CA.

== Collections ==
- The King-Size Ceramic Museum, Shanghai, China
- International Workshop of Ceramic Arts, Tokoname, Japan
- The Ceramic Research Center, Arizona State University, Tempe, Arizona
- Gangjin International Ceramic Museum, Gangjin, Korea
- Foosaner Art Museum, Melbourne, Florida
- Burroughs-Chapin Museum of Art, Myrtle Beach, South Carolina
- Florida Atlantic University, Boca Raton, Florida
- Penn State University, State College, Pennsylvania
- Palomar College, San Marcos, California
