= Cydra Vaux =

American sculptor

Cydra Robinson Vaux
- Cyda Vaux
- Born: 28 June 1962; Utah
- Died: 13 July 2013 (aged 51)
- Education: Seton Hill University
- Known for: Sculpture

Cydra Robinson Vaux (June 28, 1962 – July 13, 2013) was a feminist sculptor and art teacher. She became a member of the Society of Sculptors in 2001 and the Pittsburgh Society of Artists in 1999.

== Biography ==
Cydra R. Vaux was born June 28, 1962, in Utah. She lived in Minneapolis until age 5 and then in California from age 5 to 7, before she and her family moved to Pittsburgh, where she resided through high school. Vaux attended Seton Hill University, where she received a B.A. in theater in 1985. In 1995, she returned to Seton Hill, where she completed work for her art education certification. From 2000 to 2013, Vaux worked as an art teacher at Shadyside Academy Junior School.

Vaux's work studied the female figure in terracotta and was rooted in traditional and feminist art history. Vaux's sculptures have been shown at the Brooklyn Museum, American Jewish Museum, Three Rivers Arts Festival, Manchester Craftsmen's Guild and numerous galleries in Pittsburgh.

Vaux died July 13, 2013, of breast cancer.

== Awards ==
- Vivian Lehman Award for Portraiture, Society of Sculptors @ 75 Years, American Jewish Museum, Pittsburgh, PA September 5–12, 2010
- Fulbright Hays Group Project Abroad Grant, Art and Society:Brazil/U.S. Educational Partnership, sponsored by Center for Latin American Studies/University of Pittsburgh and the Andy Warhol Museum. Rio de Janeiro and Bahia: July 7 – August 8, 2009.
- Paul G. Benedum Teaching Fellowships Program and the Wimmer/Kamin Family, funding to visit art sites and UNESCO World Heritage sites throughout India for 17 days, including the potters colony of Kumartuli, Kolkata; Varanasi; Khajuraho; stone carvers community, Mamallapuram; The Meenakshi-Sundareswara Temple, Madurai; Ellora Caves, Aurangabad; Elephanta Caves, Mumbai, among other sites, November 2005
- Invited panel member for Women In Art: The Tradition Continues Symposium, Seton Hill University, Greensburg, PA, 2005
- Pittsburgh First Night: led a group of women to make a lantern for the Lantern Project, Pittsburgh, PA, 2000
