= New Sculpture =

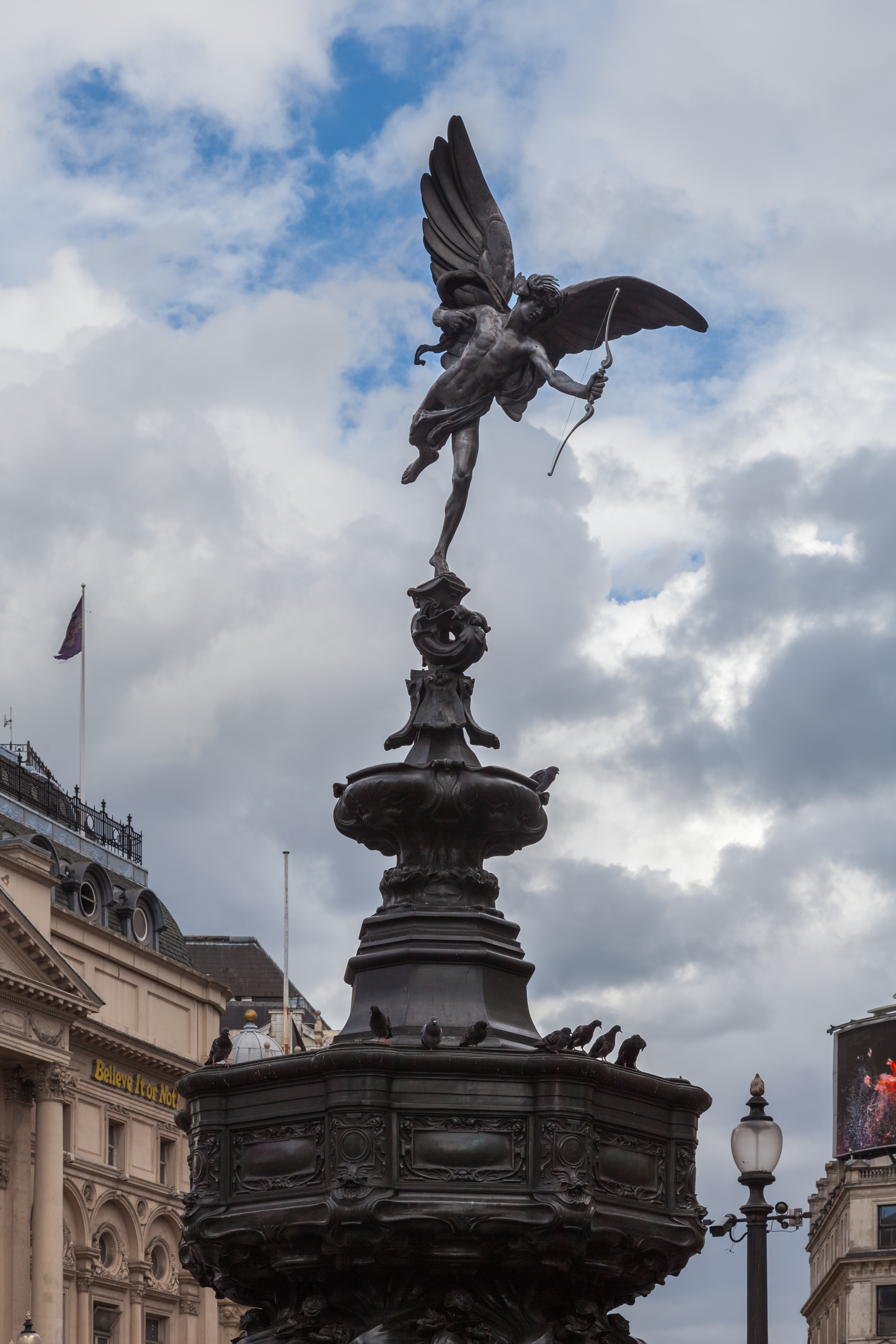
Alfred Gilbert's Shaftesbury Memorial Fountain in Piccadilly Circus, London, is one of the best-known examples of the New Sculpture.

New Sculpture was a movement in late 19th-century British sculpture with an emphasis on naturalistic poses and spiritual subjects. The movement was characterised by the production of free-standing statues and statuettes of 'ideal' figures from poetry or mythology. These figures were usually in bronze but a mixture of materials, such as ivory and gem stones, to give a polychromic effect, were also used. "New Sculpture" is most closely associated with the period from 1880 to 1910, although some artists continued to work in the style much further into the 20th-century.

The term "New Sculpture" was coined by the art critic Edmund Gosse, who wrote a four-part series for The Art Journal in 1894. After a protracted period of a stylized neoclassicism, sculpture in the last quarter of the century began to explore a greater degree of naturalism and wider range of subject matter. The French sculptor Jules Dalou, in his eight-year English exile after the Paris Commune events in 1871, taught modelling at the South Kensington School of Art, and then at the Lambeth School of Art. He profoundly influenced a new generation of British sculptors, helping to usher in a new approach to the medium.

The catalyst for this development is usually understood to be the exhibition, in 1877, of Frederic Leighton's An Athlete Wrestling with a Python. This was Leighton's first major sculpture, and he intended it as a challenge to the prevailing styles of sculpture. It reflected his interest in a more dynamic and vibrant representation of the human body and a shift from easily legible and didactic subject matter. Many sculptors looked to the Athlete and created responses to it in the following years.

The New Sculpture represents an alternate formulation of a new direction for sculpture at the end of the nineteenth century. Whereas the major French alternative to mid-19th-century sculpture, Auguste Rodin, increasingly left the accurate representation of the human body behind, the New Sculptors by and large chose to grapple with issues arising from the naturalistic representation of the body and the detailed rendering of its surface variations. The New Sculpture does not represent one singular style, but rather a range of options developed to make sculpture more vital and lifelike.

A small exhibition dedicated to the New Sculpture was held at Tate Britain during the summer and early autumn of 2010. Works on display included Pandora by Harry Bates, Mother Teaching Child and three small bronzes by Alfred Gilbert, The Singer, Applause and Folly by Edward Onslow Ford, Lycidas by James Havard Thomas, The Sluggard by Frederic Leighton and The Nymph of Loch Awe by F.W. Pomeroy.

== Sculptors ==
Major figures associated with the New Sculpture, either by making a significant contribution to the movement or whose work was influenced by that of the major protagonists include:

- C. J. Allen
- Harry Bates
- Gilbert Bayes
- Sir Thomas Brock
- William Robert Colton
- Benjamin Creswick
- Jules Dalou
- Frances Darlington
- Conrad Dressler
- Alfred Drury
- Henry Charles Fehr
- Edward Onslow Ford
- George Frampton
- William Silver Frith
- Alfred Gilbert
- Margaret Giles
- Albert Hodge
- Frank Lynn Jenkins
- Goscombe John
- Édouard Lantéri
- Thomas Stirling Lee
- Frederic Leighton
- Ruby Levick
- Andrea Carlo Lucchesi
- Bertram Mackennal
- Thomas Nelson Maclean
- Paul Raphael Montford
- Esther Mary Moore
- Edwin Roscoe Mullins
- Henry Albert Pegram
- Charles James Pibworth
- F.W. Pomeroy
- Henry Poole
- William Reynolds-Stephens
- John Wenlock Rollins
- Ellen Mary Rope
- Frederick Schenck, active 1886–1907
- George Blackall Simonds
- Lilian Simpson
- Florence Steele
- John Macallan Swan
- James Havard Thomas
- Hamo Thornycroft
- Albert Toft
- Alfred Turner
- Arthur George Walker
- Reginald Fairfax Wells
- Lucy Gwendolen Williams
- Francis Derwent Wood
