= Édouard Lantéri =

French sculptor

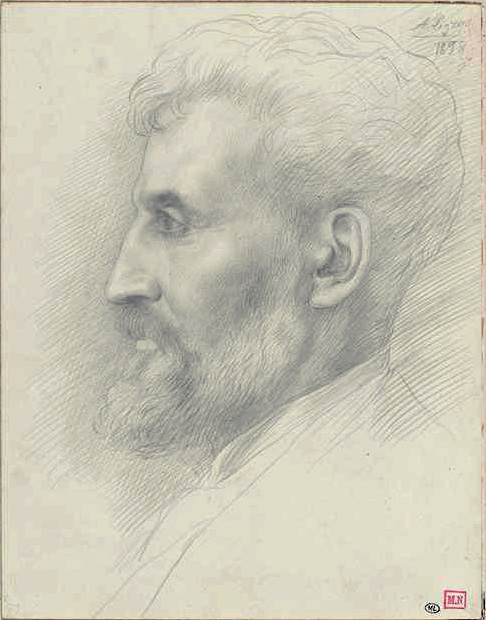
- Édouard Lantéri by Alphonse Legros
- Born: 31 October 1848; Auxerre, France
- Died: 22 December 1917 (aged 69); London, England
- Education: François-Joseph Duret, Aimé Millet, École des Beaux-Arts (Jean-Baptiste Claude Eugène Guillaume, Pierre-Jules Cavelier)
- Known for: Sculpture
- Movement: New Sculpture

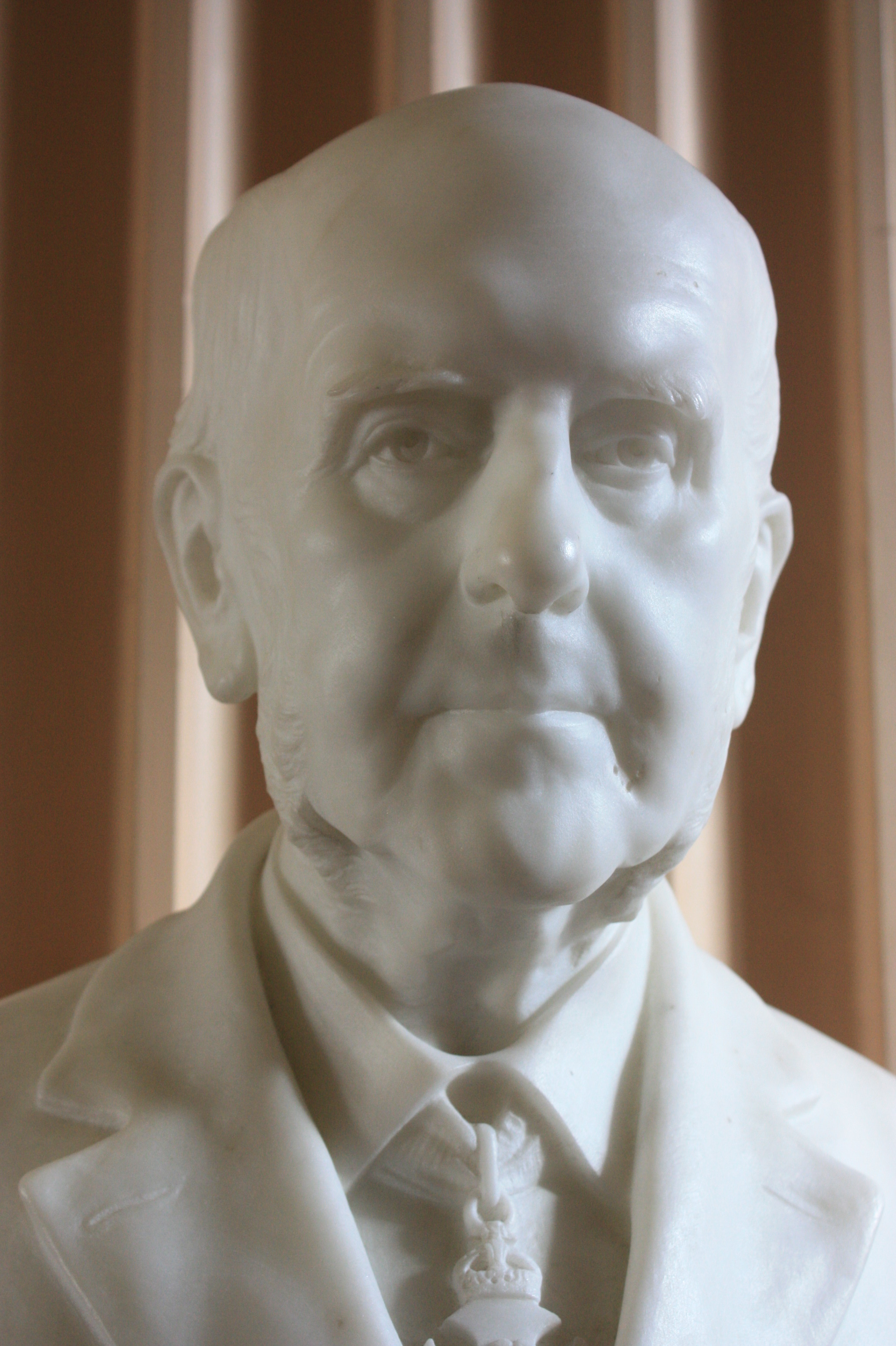
Bust of Sir Archibald Geikie, by Edward Lanteri 1916, Old College, University of Edinburgh

Édouard Lantéri (31 October 1848 – 22 December 1917) was a French-born British sculptor and medallist whose romantic French style of sculpting was seen as influential among exponents of New Sculpture. His name is also frequently spelled without accents as Edouard Lanteri and his first name sometimes given in its English form as Edward.

== Biography ==
Lantéri was born in Auxerre, France but later took British nationality. He studied art in the studios of François-Joseph Duret and Aimé Millet and at the school of fine arts under Jean-Baptiste Claude Eugène Guillaume and Pierre-Jules Cavelier. A period of poverty led him to becoming a cabinetmaker, but in 1872, at the age of 24, on the recommendation of fellow sculptor Jules Dalou, he moved to London to work as a studio assistant to Joseph Edgar Boehm. He stayed at the studio until 1890 and influenced Boehm's pupil Alfred Gilbert.

Lantéri's sculptures were mainly modelled in clay before being cast in bronze, though he would also work in stone. He produced portrait busts, statuettes and life size statues. As of 1880 he taught at the National Art Training School in South Kensington, which became the Royal College of Art in 1896, and in 1900 became the college's first professor of modelling (1900–10); in this role he was involved with the architectural and decorative sculpture for Sir Aston Webb's Victoria & Albert Museum, London.

== Written works ==
Towards the end of Lantéri's life he wrote a series of three books, explaining the art of human and animal composition in sculpture. First released as a collection of three books, they are now commonly found as two, with the animal sculpture separate from the human form. These books are still common required texts for many sculpture courses. The foreword to the original book was by friend and fellow sculptor Auguste Rodin who refers to Lantéri as "Dear Master"

- Modelling; A Guide for Teachers and Students (three volumes), London, Chapman and Hall (1911)
- Modelling and Sculpting the Human Figure, Dover Publications Inc., new edition (1986)
- Modelling and Sculpting Animals, Dover Publications Inc., new edition (1986)

== Notable pupils ==
- William Kellock Brown
- Mary Gaskell Gillick (nee Tutin)
- Benjamin Clemens
- Alexander Carrick
- T. Mewburn Crook
- Francis William Doyle-Jones
- Margaret Giles
- Allen Hutchinson
- Charles Sargeant Jagger
- Gilbert Ledward
- Ruby Levick
- Walter Marsden
- Esther Moore
- Oliver Sheppard
- Clare Sheridan
- Francis Shurrock
- Lilian Simpson
- Florence Steele
- Albert Toft
- Lillian Wade
- Reginald Fairfax Wells
- Charles Wheeler
- Lucy Gwendolen Williams
- Dorothy Stanton Wise
- Francis Derwent Wood
