= Cherilla Storrs Lowrey =

American clubwoman

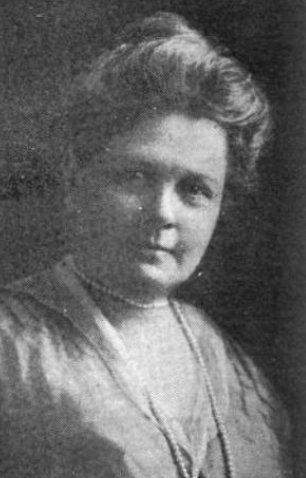
- Cherilla Storrs Lowrey, from a 1917 publication
- Born: Cherilla Lillian Storrs; August 18, 1861; Utica, New York
- Died: January 9, 1918 (aged 56); Honolulu, Hawai'i
- Occupations: Clubwoman, educator
- Relatives: William Richards Castle (brother-in-law); William Richards Castle Jr. (nephew)

Cherilla Lillian Storrs Lowrey (August 18, 1861 – January 9, 1918) was an American educator and clubwoman based in Hawaii. She was a founder and first chairwoman of The Outdoor Circle, "Hawaii's oldest environmental organization".

== Early life ==
Storrs was born in Utica, New York. She moved to California as a girl with her widowed mother.

== Career ==
Lowrey moved to Hawaii in 1882 to teach at Kawaiahao Seminary, a girls' school. She also taught at the Punahou School, and was an assistant principal there in 1883. She was active in the Free Kindergarten and Children's Aid Association (FKCAA), the Women's Board of Missions, the YWCA, and Women's War Council. She was one of the first two women to serve on the Honolulu Planning Commission.

In 1912, Lowrey was one of the original seven members and the first president of The Outdoor Circle, a women's organization based in Honolulu, initially under the auspices of the Kilohana Art League. The Circle was dedicated to city beautification, especially against billboards and in favor of public fountains, parks, playgrounds, and gardens, and "to conserve and develop the natural beauties of the landscape by encouraging the growth of native trees and shrubs, and the introduction of such new ones as belong to tropical life". The Outdoor Circle had hundreds of members by 1915, many of them wives of wealthy white sugar and lumber executives, like Lowrey, whose husband was president of the Oahu Sugar Company and the Waiahole Water Company, and vice-president of the Honolulu Gas Company.

== Personal life and legacy ==
Storrs married merchant Frederick Jewett Lowrey in 1884. They had four children together. She died after a stroke in 1918, aged 56 years, in Honolulu.

The Outdoor Circle and other friends commissioned a marble fountain by sculptor Roger Noble Burnham, in memory of Lowrey. A species of loulou palm, Pritchardia lowreyana, was named for Lowrey by botanist Joseph F. Rock. Hawaiian Mission Houses for several years presented a dramatic re-enactment of Cherilla Lowrey’s contribution to the community at the Oʻahu Cemetery Pūpū Theatre. The Outdoor Circle continues into the 21st century as an environmental organization in Hawai'i. "No environmental group has had such a profound, positive impact on Hawai'i as The Outdoor Circle," Duke Bainum said in a 2000 newspaper interview.
