= Esther Moore =

British artist (1857–1934)

Esther Mary Moore
- Born: 6 November 1857; Burnley, England
- Died: 1934 (aged 76–77); Devon, England
- Education: Royal College of Art
- Known for: Sculpture

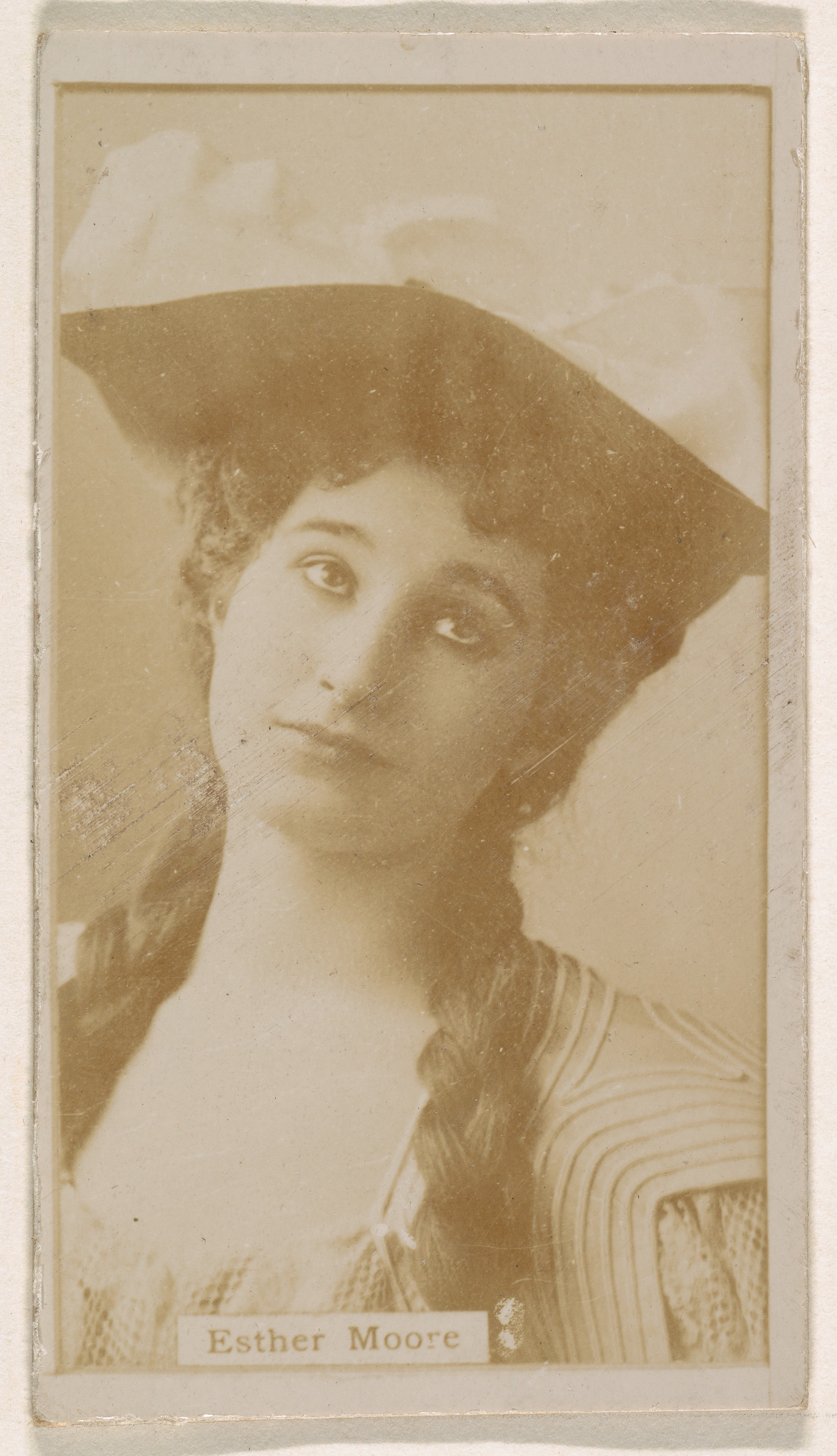

Esther Mary Moore (6 November 1857–1934) was a British artist known for her sculptures, metalwork and jewellery.

== Biography ==
Moore was born in Burnley in Lancashire, one of the eight children of Mary Margerison and Henry Moore, who was a master spinner who employed over 900 mill workers plus a number of servants for the family home. After his wife died, he relocated the family to Hampshire and then, in the early 1890s to Bedford Park at Chiswick in London.

Esther Moore worked as a designer for a silversmith until she won a scholarship to the National Art Training School, NATS, where she was taught by the sculptor Édouard Lantéri. Among her contemporaries at NATS, which became the Royal College of Art in 1896, were a number of other female sculptors including Margaret Giles, Ruby Levick, Florence Steele, Lilian Simpson and Lucy Gwendolen Williams. After further training in Paris, Moore established a studio in Chiswick and began exhibiting at the Royal Academy, RA, in London. Between 1890 and 1919 she showed some 19 pieces at the RA, including Art Nouveau statuettes and busts. In 1893 she won a silver medal in the National Art Competition and in 1896 exhibited several pieces, including a cabinet she designed with the architect Charles Harrison Townsend, at the Arts and Crafts Exhibition Society. For the Della Robbia Pottery in Birkenhead, Moore designed decorative sculptures and household items including lamps and light fittings. During her career Moore also designed silver and bronze panels, memorials and decorative jewellery, and she exhibited with the Society of Women Artists, with the Royal Scottish Academy, at the Walker Art Gallery in Liverpool and at the Paris Salon. Her work was featured in both The Studio and The Art Journal magazines during her life.

Two of Moore's sisters, Florence and Charlotte, also became artists, as did her father after he retired from business. Esther Moore spent her later years in Devon and the Royal Cornwall Museum has examples of her sculptures. The Minneapolis Institute of Art holds her bronze statuette The Charmed Circle of Youth.
