= Ruby Levick =

Welsh sculptor (1871–1940)

- Born: Ruby Winifred Levick; 11 September 1871; Llandaff, Glamorgan, Wales
- Died: 31 March 1940 (aged 68); London, England
- Occupation: Sculptor
- Spouse: Gervase Bailey (m. 1905–1940)

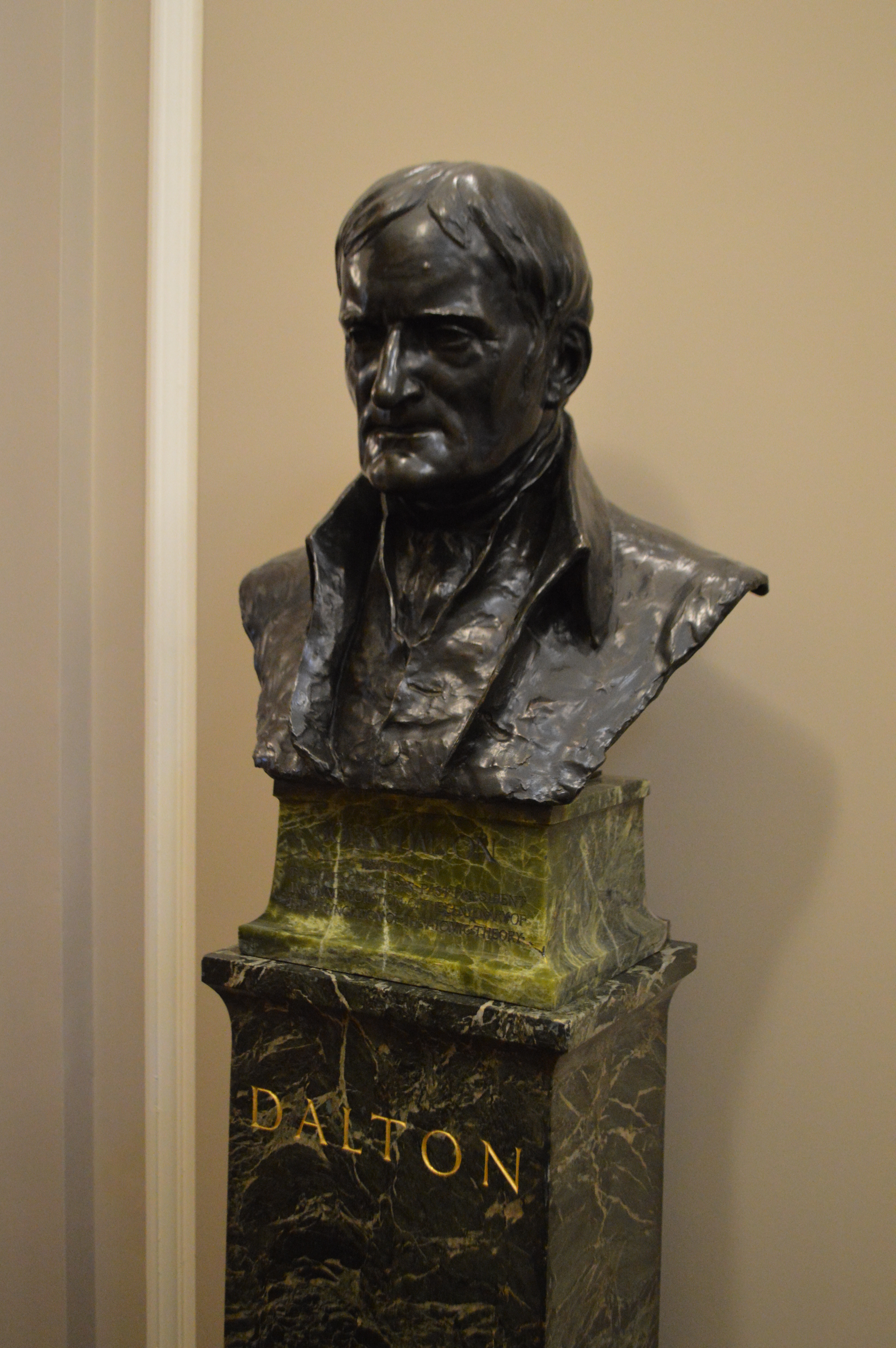
Levick's bust of John Dalton, in the collection of the Royal Society of Chemistry at Burlington House, London

Ruby Winifred Levick (11 September 1871 – 31 March 1940) was a Welsh sculptor and medallist who had many of her works exhibited at the Royal Academy.

== Biography ==
Levick was born in Llandaff, Glamorgan, the daughter of George Levick, a civil engineer from Blaina, and Jeannie Sowerby. Her younger brother was the explorer George Murray Levick. She studied at the National Art Training School, NATS, in London between 1893 and 1897, where she was taught by the sculptor Édouard Lantéri and where she won a gold medal for her statuette Boys Wrestling. Among her contemporaries at NATS, which became the Royal College of Art in 1896, were several other notable female sculptors including Margaret Giles, Esther Moore, Florence Steele, Lilian Simpson and Lucy Gwendolen Williams. Throughout her career Levick specialised in bronze statuettes and garden pieces, often of children at play or of people in motion. Her statuettes of male athletes and groups of working people, for example Fishermen Hauling in a Net, were much admired. Levick also created a number of works for churches. These included a set of panels for the Chapel of St Edmund in Hunstanton plus panels and reredos for St Brelades in Jersey.

Levick exhibited her work at the Society of Medallists in 1898 and 1901, with the Arts and Crafts Exhibition Society in 1899, 1903 and 1916 and also at the Walker Art Gallery in Liverpool, the Ridley Art Club and at the Royal Academy in London.
