= Charles James Pibworth =

English sculptor

- Born: 1878; Barton Regis, Gloucestershire, England
- Died: 8 November 1958 (aged 79–80); England
- Known for: Sculpture

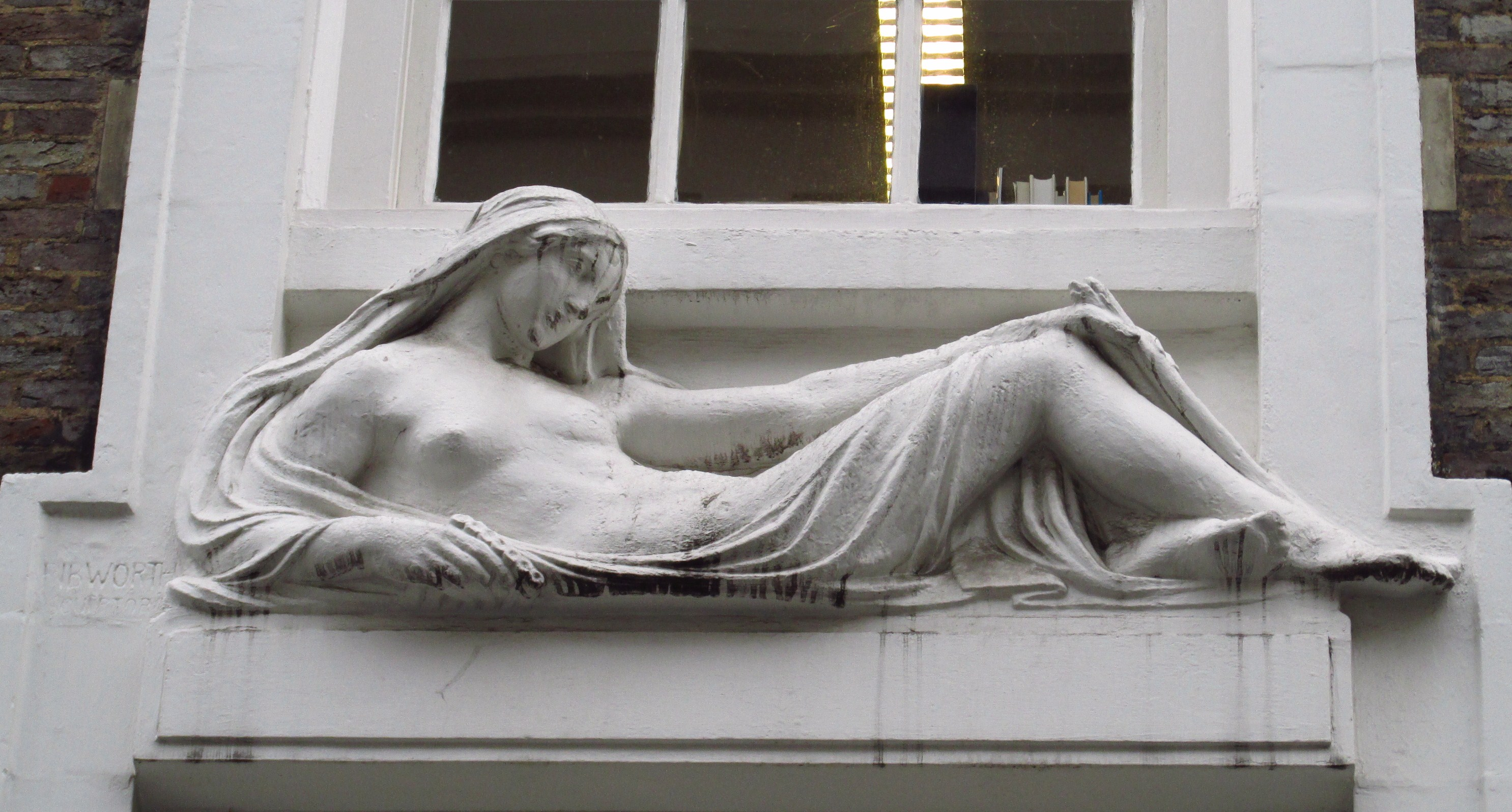
Euterpe (1912) by Pibworth on Archer Street in Soho

Charles James Pibworth (1878 – 8 November 1958) was an English sculptor. He is known for his architectural sculpture and as a member of the New Sculpture movement.

== Biography ==
Charles James Pibworth was born in Barton Regis, now part of Bristol, to Charles K Pibworth, a bootmaker, in 1878. His artistic training involved study at the Bristol School of Art, the Royal College of Art and the Royal Academy Schools under Onslow Ford, George Frampton and Thomas Brock. After studying, Pibworth exhibited at both Royal Academy Exhibitions and the Paris Salon, with works of portraits and mythological figures.

Pibworth worked specialise in architectural Sculpture, working extensively alongside Charles Holden in his early career. He was a member of the Royal Society of British Sculptors, elected a fellow in 1907, as well as a member of the Art Workers' Guild in 1910.

His public commissions include a bust of Sir Johnston Forbes-Robertson for Drury Lane Theatre, the war memorial at the Turf Club, and the twenty-one life-size figures for Bristol’s Central Library. Examples of his work can be found at the Leicester Museum and Art Gallery and at Aberdeen Art Gallery.

== See also ==
- New Sculpture
