= Florence Steele =

British artist (1857–1948)

Florence Harriet Steele
- Born: 1857; Reigate, England
- Died: 1948 (aged 90–91)
- Education: Royal College of Art
- Known for: Sculpture, metalwork

Florence Harriet Steele (1857–6 January 1948) was a British artist known as a sculptor, designer and metalworker.

== Biography ==
Steele was born in Reigate and was the youngest of the eight children of Harriet and John Steele, a local general practitioner.

Between 1892 and 1896 Steele studied at the National Art Training School, NATS, in London where she was taught by the sculptor Édouard Lantéri. Among her contemporaries at NATS, which became the Royal College of Art in 1896, were a number of other female students who became notable sculptors including Margaret Giles, Ruby Levick, Esther Moore, Lilian Simpson and Lucy Gwendolen Williams. While at NATS, Steele won several prizes including a gold medal in 1894. In 1896 Steele established a studio in Hammersmith in west London and soon came to be highly regarded as an Art Nouveau designer and metalworker. She created a large amount of work in silver including jewellery, mirror frames, caskets, walking stick heads, christening cups and alms dishes and, in bronze, portrait medallions and sundials. Steele also created trophies and civic regalia for a number of British local authorities.

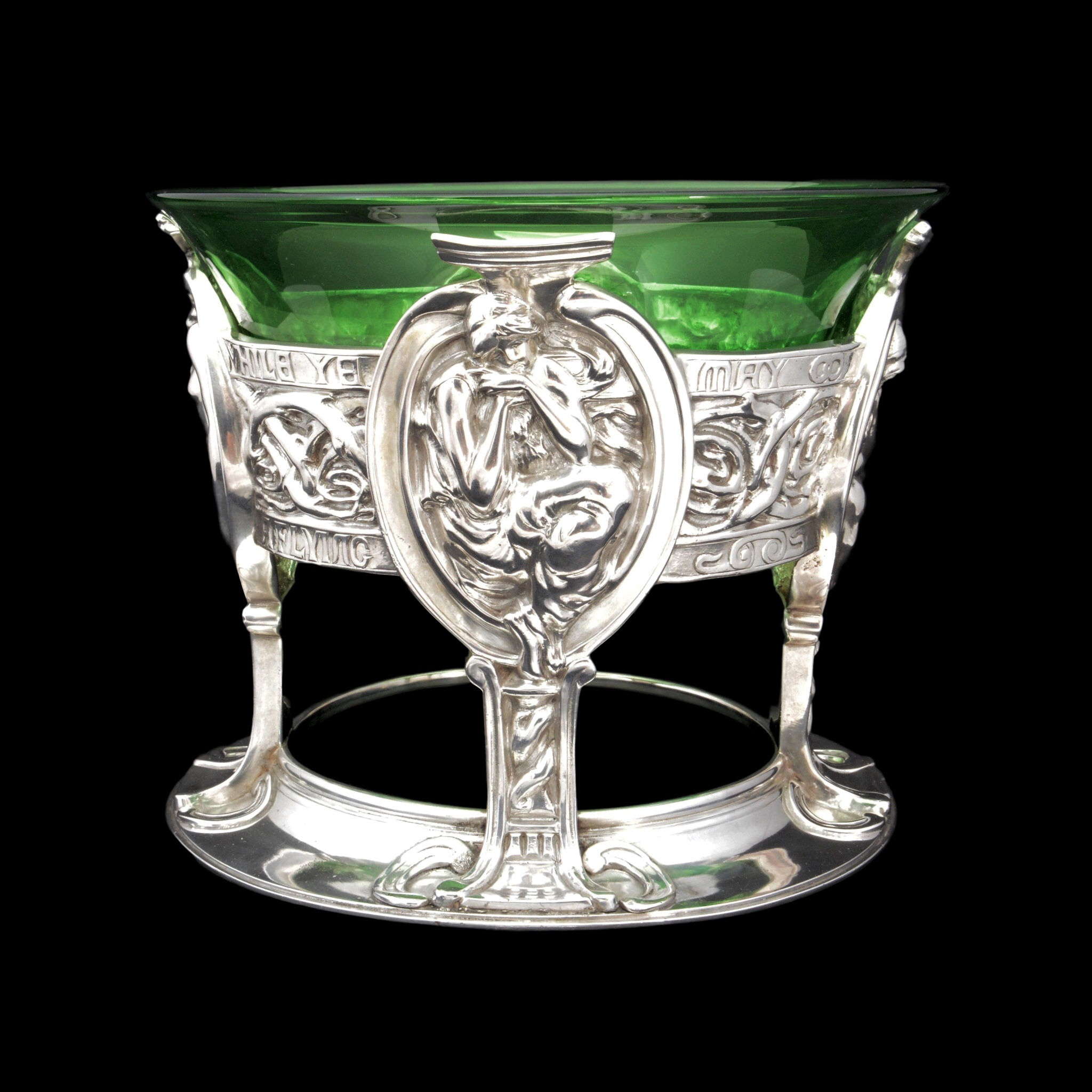
A silver centre-piece by Steele

Between 1896 and 1918 Steele had some 34 works shown at the Royal Academy including the statuette Hero finding the body of Leander and the bas relief Dawn Dispelling Sleep and Night. From 1896 onwards Steele also regularly exhibited with the Arts and Crafts Exhibition Society. Examples of her metalwork were included in both the 1901 Glasgow Exhibition and the 1903 City of Bradford Exhibition. For the city of Preston Steele created a triptych in silver and enamel which was presented to the Earl of Derby when he was granted the freedom of the city in 1903. Steele also designed a chain of office to be used by the mayoress of Preston from 1906. These, and several other designs by Steele, were featured in the art magazines of the time, including The Studio, the Art Journal and the Art Workers Quarterly.

On a contract basis, she produced designs for both Pilkington and Elkington & Co. and a number of her Pilkington tile designs were shown at the Paris International Exhibition of 1900. Her work was promoted by the Art Union of London which produced a limited edition of Dawn Dispelling Sleep and Night for subscribers in 1910. In 1914 she showed, at the Royal Academy, a medal design for the Women's School of Medicine and in 1917 designed a memorial, in stone, for the Weddell family of Glasgow.
