= Bessie Wheeler =

American painter

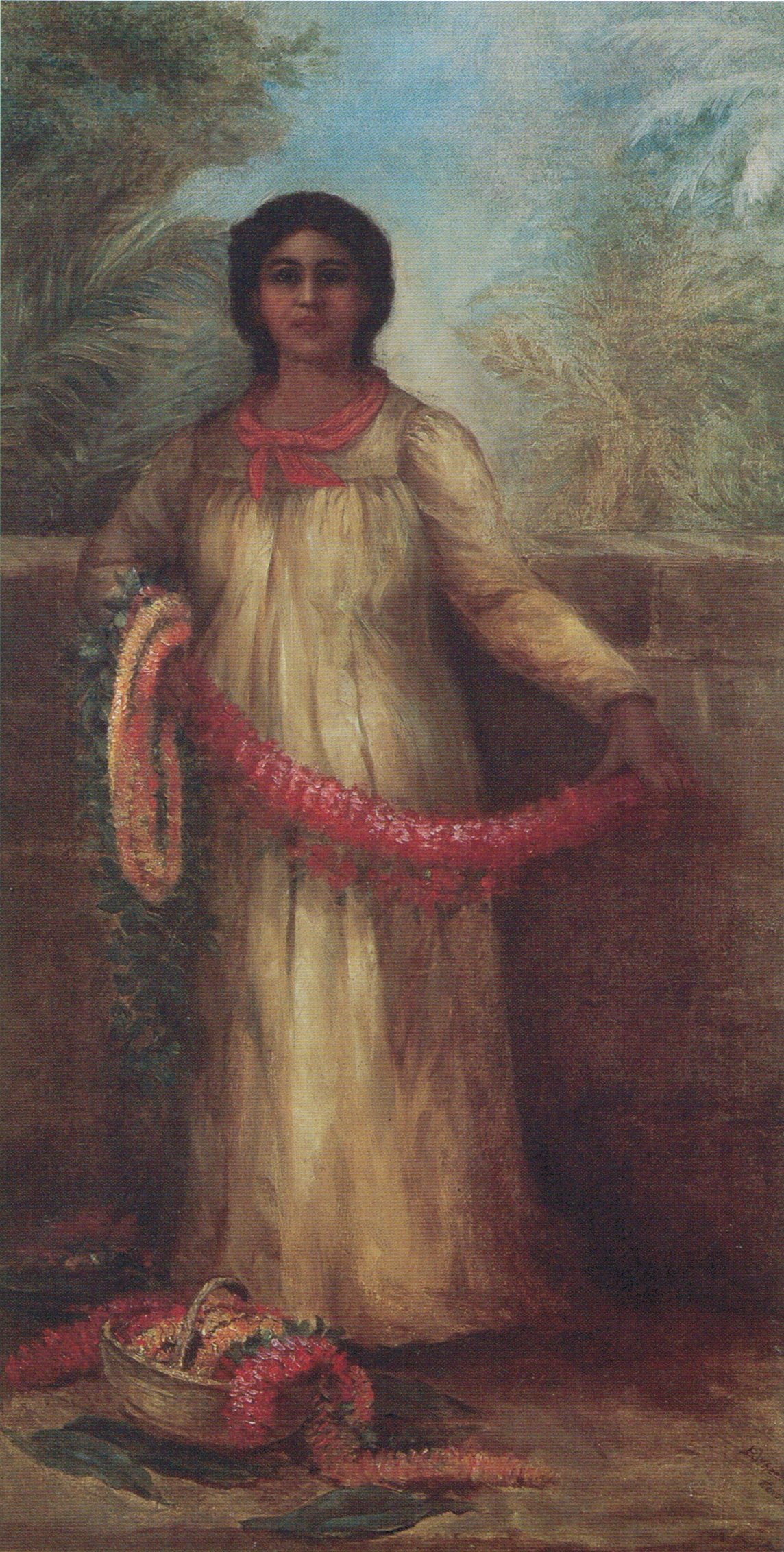
Bessie Wheeler, Flower Lei Seller, c. 1900

Bessie Wheeler (1876–?), was an American painter about whom little is known. She painted portraits of people encountered on the streets of Honolulu around 1900. She contributed illustrations to Thrum's Hawaiian Annual and was a member of the Kilohana Art League.
