= Harry Bates (sculptor) =

British sculptor

- Born: 26 April 1850; Stevenage
- Died: 30 January 1899 (aged 48); London
- Known for: Sculpture
- Awards: Royal Academy

Harry Bates ARA (26 April 1850 – 30 January 1899) was a British sculptor. He was elected to the Royal Academy in 1892 as A.R.A. and was an active, if intermittent, member of the Art Workers Guild. He was a central figure in the British movement known as New Sculpture.

== Early life and education ==
Bates was born on 26 April 1850 in Stevenage in Hertfordshire. He began his career as a carver's assistant, and before beginning the regular study of plastic art he passed through a long apprenticeship in architectural decoration working from 1869 for the firm of Farmer & Brindley.

== Career ==
In 1879 he went to London and entered the South London School of Technical Art (formerly known as Lambeth School of Art, now the City and Guilds of London Art School). There he studied under Jules Dalou and won a silver medal in the national competition at South Kensington. In 1881, he was admitted to the Royal Academy schools, where in 1883 he won the gold medal and the travelling scholarship with his relief of Socrates teaching the People in the Agora.

In 1883 he immediately went to Paris, where he took up an independent studio (on Dalou's suggestion) in 1883–85. He was influenced by Rodin, who advised him on occasion about his work. A head and three small bronze panels (the Aeneid), executed by Bates in Paris, were exhibited at the Royal Academy, and selected for purchase by the Chantrey Bequest trustees; but the selection had to be cancelled, because they had not been modelled in Britain.

In 1886, Bates returned to Britain and was elected to the Art Workers Guild.

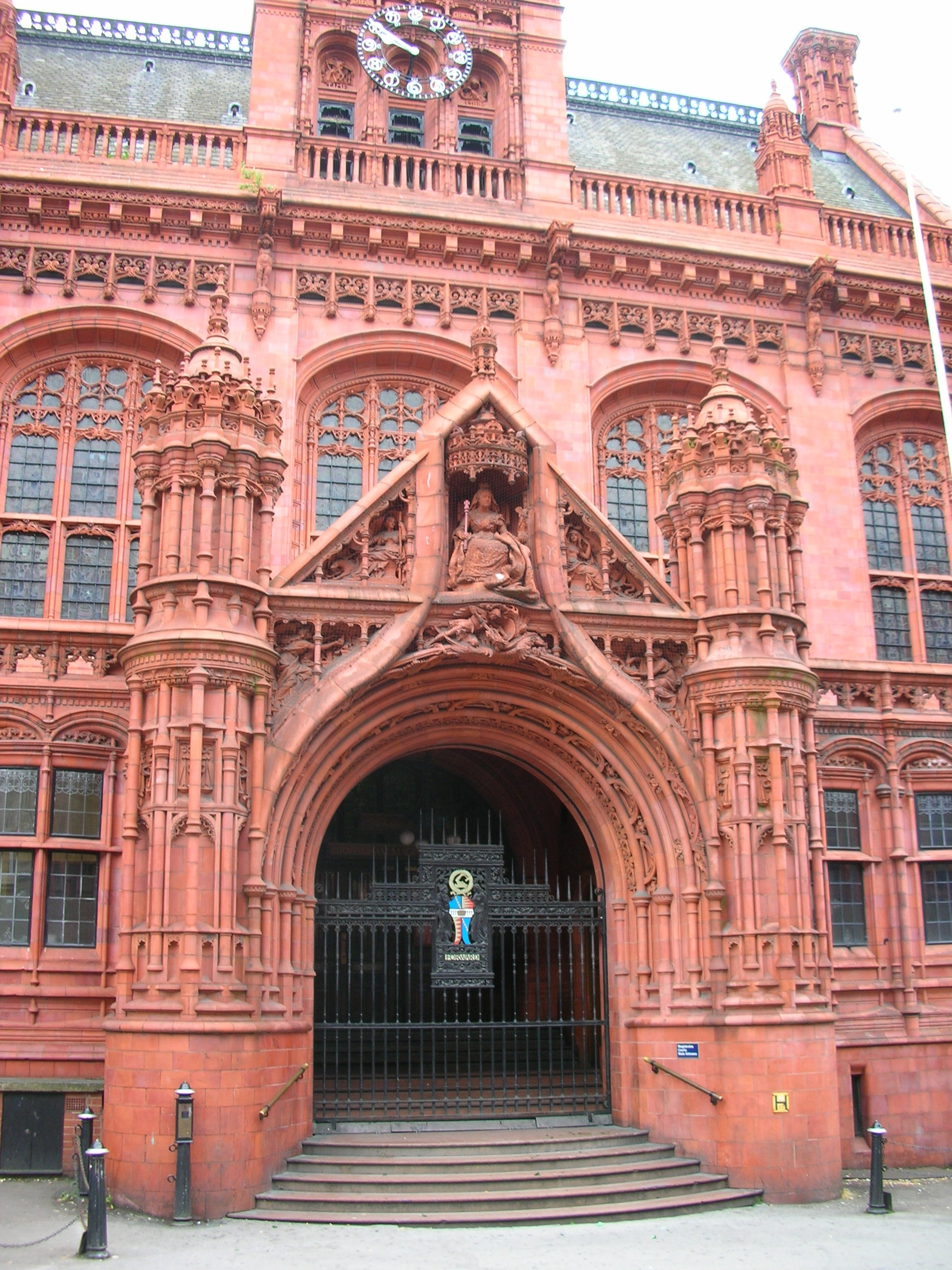
Bates's figure of Victoria above the Victoria Law Courts in Birmingham

He created panels of Aeneas (1885), Homer (1886), three panels of Psyche and Rhodope (1887).

Bates's primary skill lay in the composition and sculpting of relief sculpture, and it is in this medium that he achieved his most technically and aesthetically refined work. The freestanding ideal sculpture remained the most important of sculptural genres, however. Bates gradually turned to statues such as the 1889 Hounds in Leash, which is essentially a relief composition translated to three dimensions. In this work, Bates demonstrated his ability to convey muscular intensity and movement and led to his greater success and ambition.

His next major statue, the 1890 Pandora, was more truly a figure in the round. The life-sized figure was unusually nude, compared to other contemporary depictions. In 1890 this was received as a "fresh reading of the subject, and instead of the customary elf-like or voluptuous woman [Bates] has shown a tender, very gentle and happy maiden, whose features are charming". In this work Bates experimented with polychromy and mixed materials, making it self-consciously into a paradigmatic example of his artistic priorities. The box she holds is an actual decorative casket made of ivory and gilt bronze and elaborately carved with scenes from the Pandora legend. It was exhibited in 1890 at the Royal Academy Summer Exhibition and purchased within the following year for the Chantrey Bequest. The gallery label at the Tate said in 2010, "Bates shows the moment of hesitation before Pandora opens the forbidden box. He suggests Pandora's mood of consideration and temptation while also recognising the inevitable fulfilment of the myth. This way he acknowledges the compulsion of character, and frailty of the human spirit." His creation of the marble altar front for the Holy Trinity church in Sloane Street, London was another piece he created in 1890.

In the year of his death 1899, Bates finished Mors Janua Vitae (death, gateway of life), now at Walker Art Gallery Liverpool. In 2007 it has been described as "bizarre polychrome symbolist fantasy".

One of his final commissions was a large bronze statue of Queen Victoria unveiled in Albert Square in Dundee shortly after his death.

== Personal life and death ==
Bates died in poverty, having drained his finances "by his insistence on financing the Calcutta statue of Lord Roberts from his own pocket." He died on 30 January 1899 at his residence, 10 Hall Road, St. John's Wood, N.W. He was buried at Stevenage on 4 February.

== Assessment ==
The 1911 Encyclopædia Britannica wrote: "The portrait-busts of Harry Bates are good pieces of realism: strong, yet delicate in technique, and excellent in character. His statues have a picturesqueness in which the refinement of the sculptor is always felt. Among the chief of these are the fanciful Maharaja of Mysore, somewhat overladen with ornament, and the colossal equestrian statue of Lord Roberts (1896) upon its important pedestal, girdled with a frieze of figures, now set up in Calcutta, and a statue of Queen Victoria for Dundee. But perhaps his masterpiece—in which his interest in polychromy and mixed materials in a format that fused decorative art and sculpture achieved its fullest realization—was an allegorical presentment of Love and Life, a winged male figure in bronze, with a female figure in ivory being crowned by the male." The 1911 Encyclopædia Britannica felt, "his premature death robbing English plastic art of its most promising representative at the time".

As of 2022, the figure of Pandora is understood "as one of the many femme fatales whose deadly attraction mesmerised Victorian men." While continental sculptors experimented with the ancient chryselephantine technique in the 1840s, Bates Pandora was the first chryselephantine work by a British artist.

Bates is primarily remembered as one of the most important sculptors working with the traditions of the decorative arts within the New Sculpture movement. Both through his innovative use of polychromy and his allusive subject matter, he is understood to be one of primary representatives of international Symbolism within British sculpture.

== Gallery ==
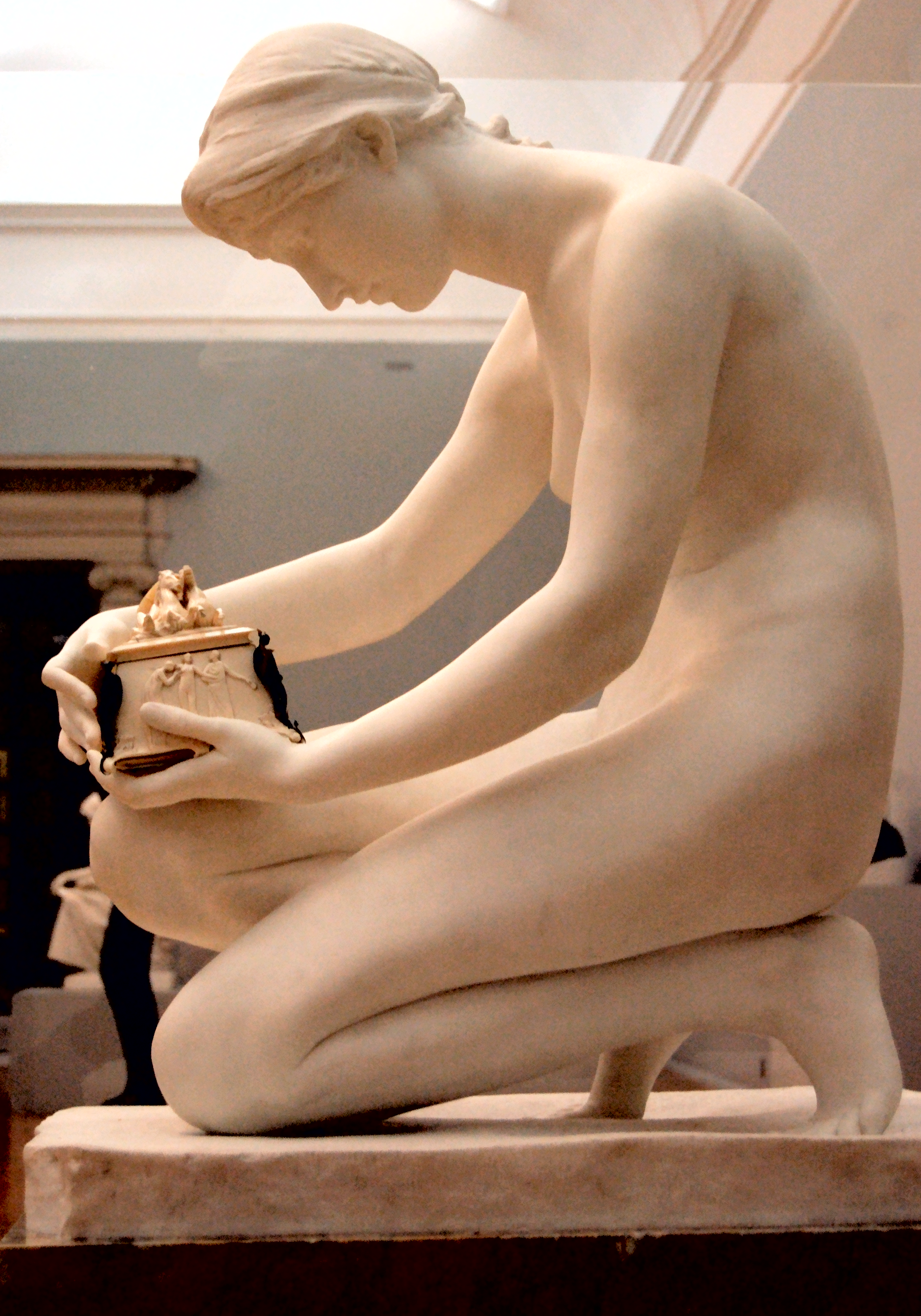
Statue of Pandora, 1891, owned by Tate Britain, London

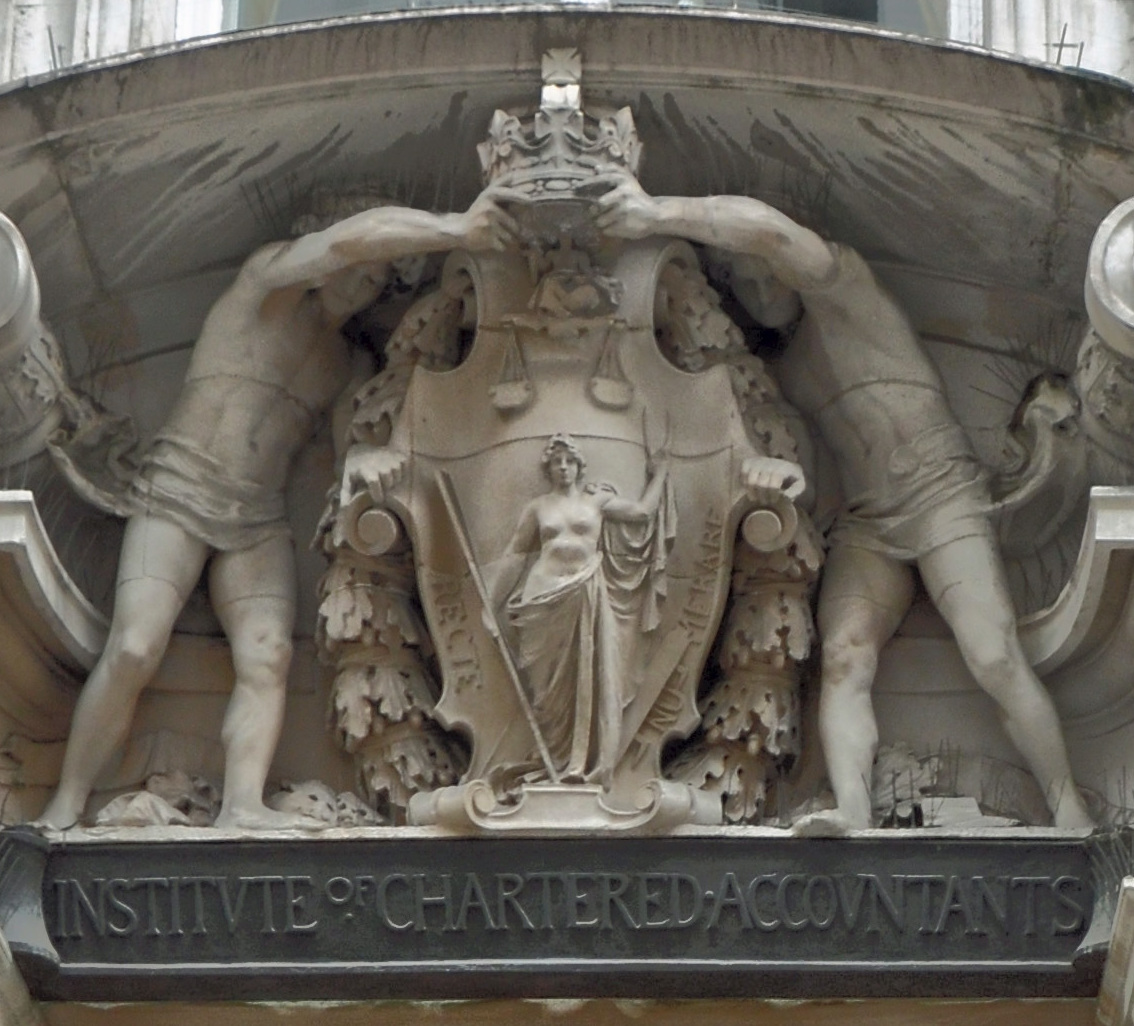
Boys with Coat of Arms, Moorgate Place Entrance of Chartered Accountants' Hall

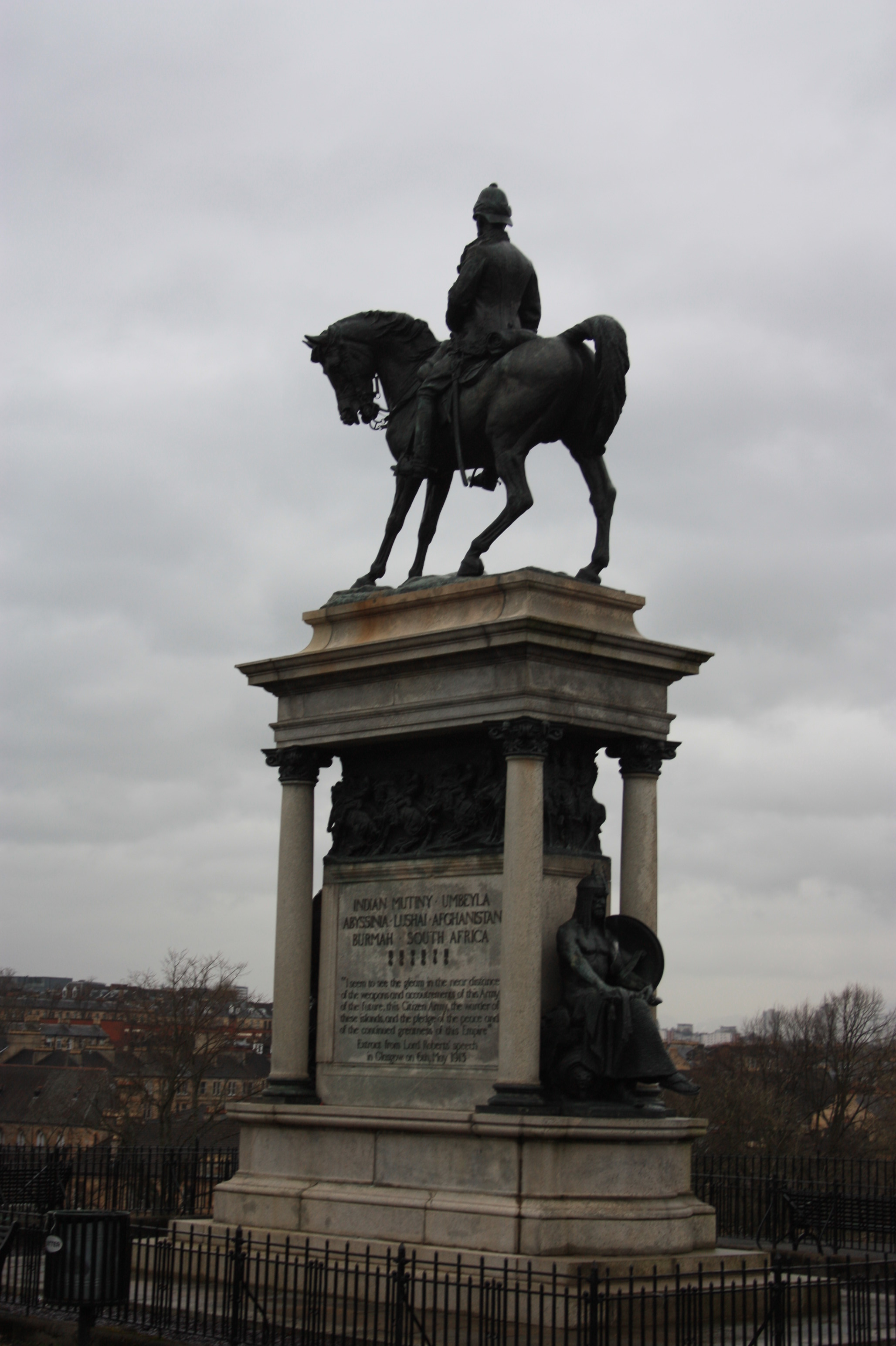
Statue of Earl Roberts, 1896, Kelvingrove Park, Glasgow

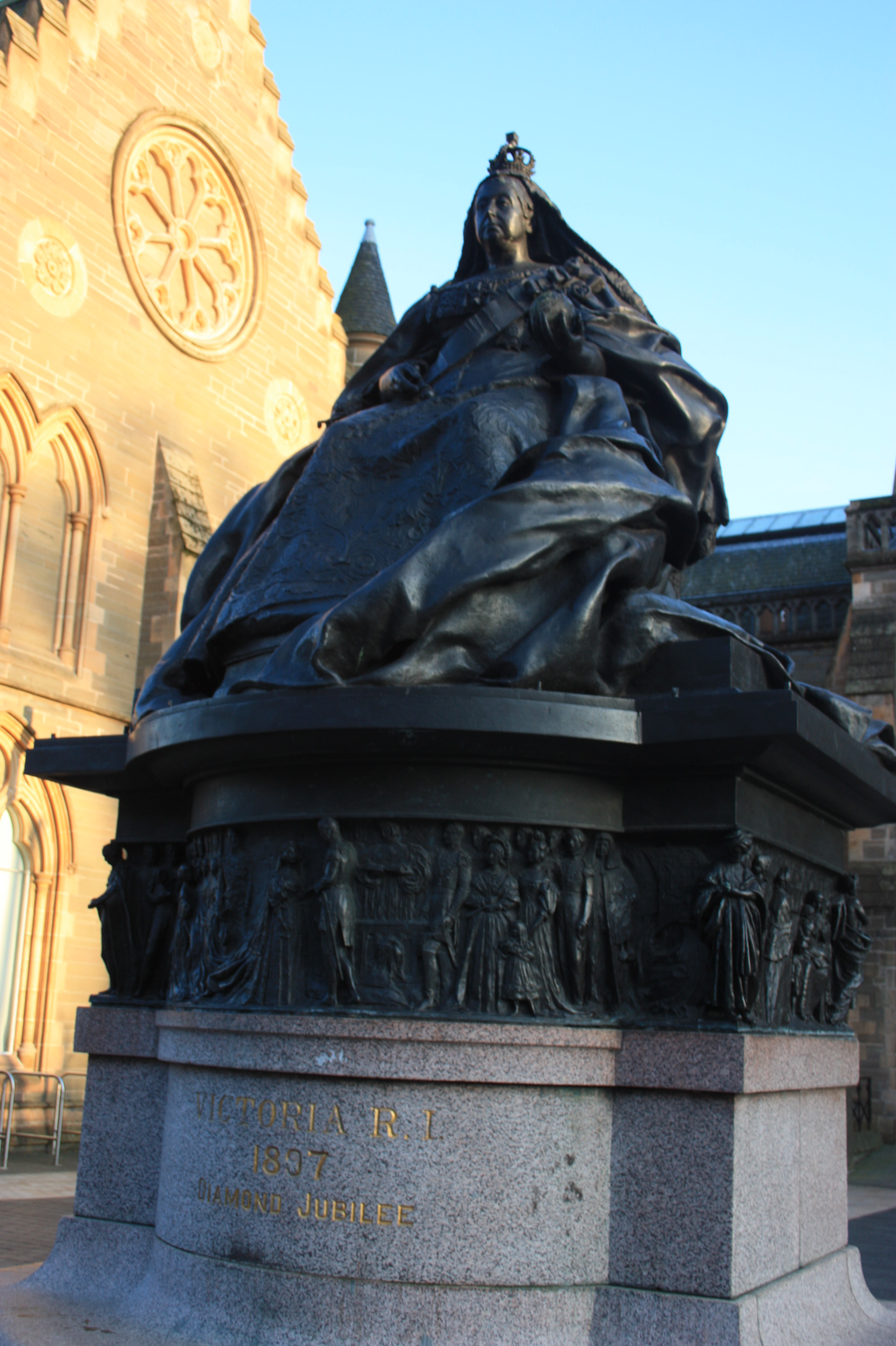
Statue of Queen Victoria, 1899, Albert Square, Dundee

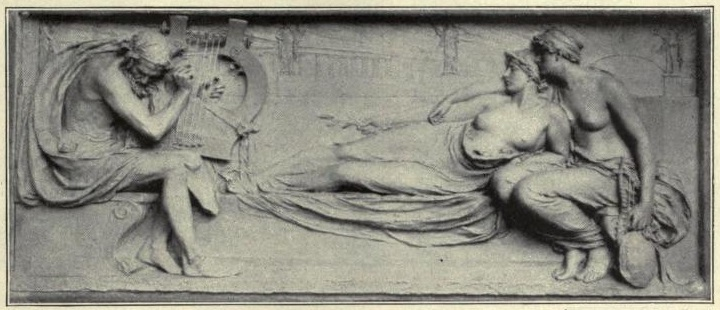
Sculpture of Homer, 1886

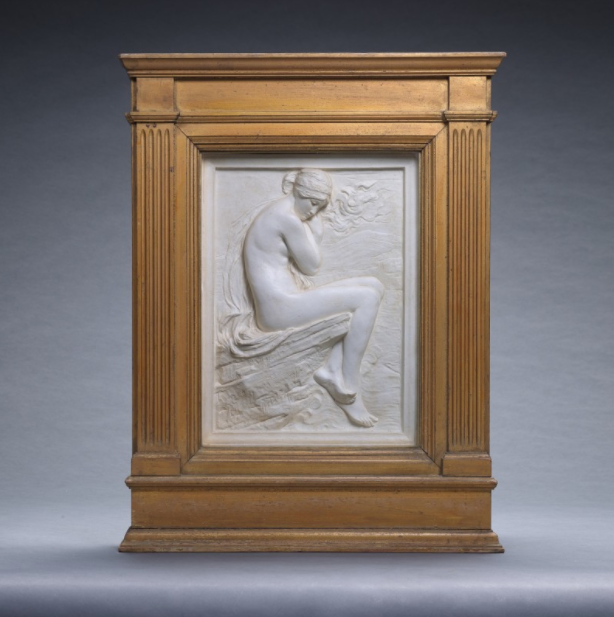
Relief of Psyche, Mougins Museum of Classical Art
