= Alfred Richard Gurrey Sr. =

American painter

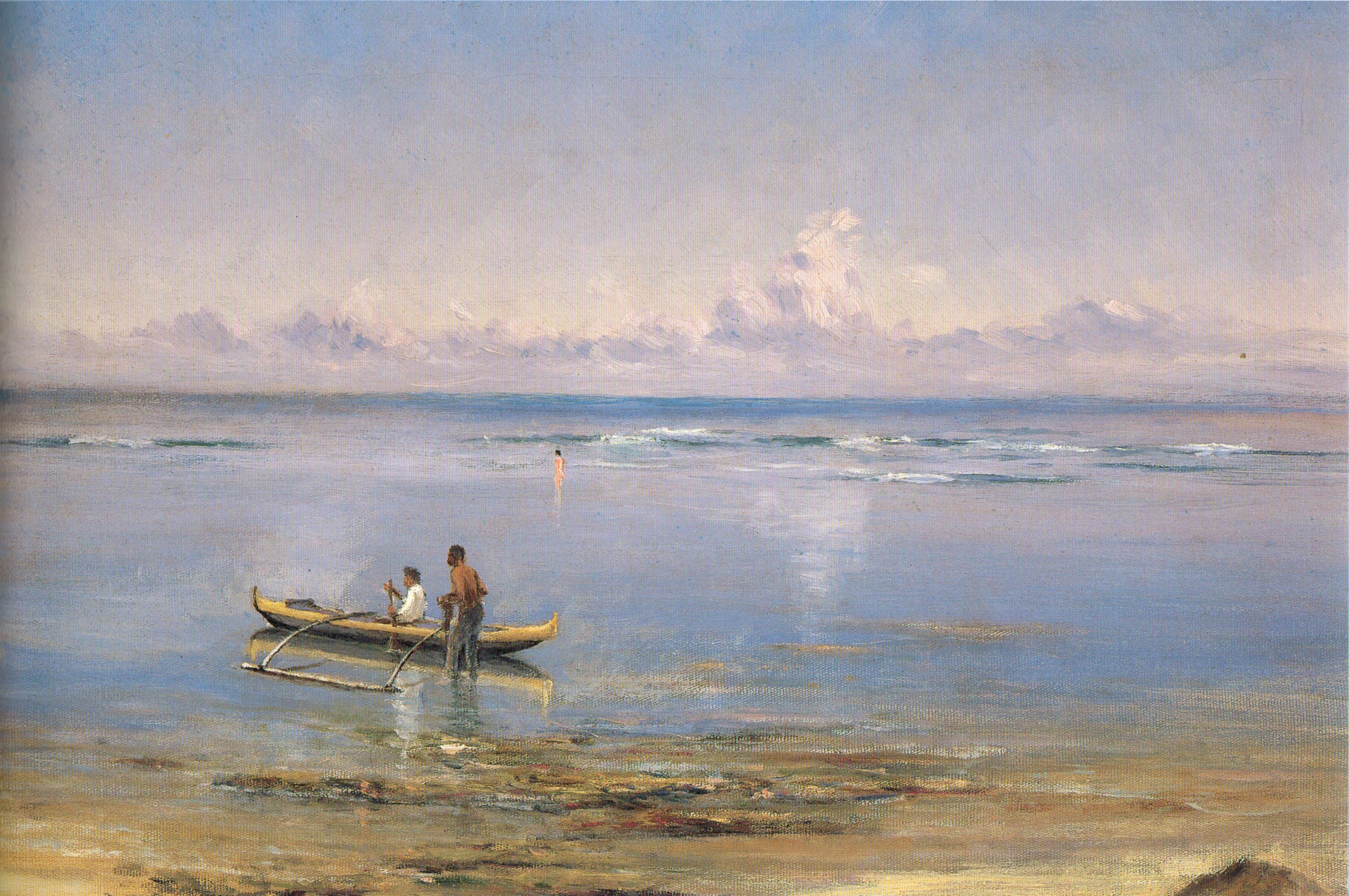
Ala Moana Beach, oil on canvas painting by Alfred Richard Gurrey, Sr., 1915

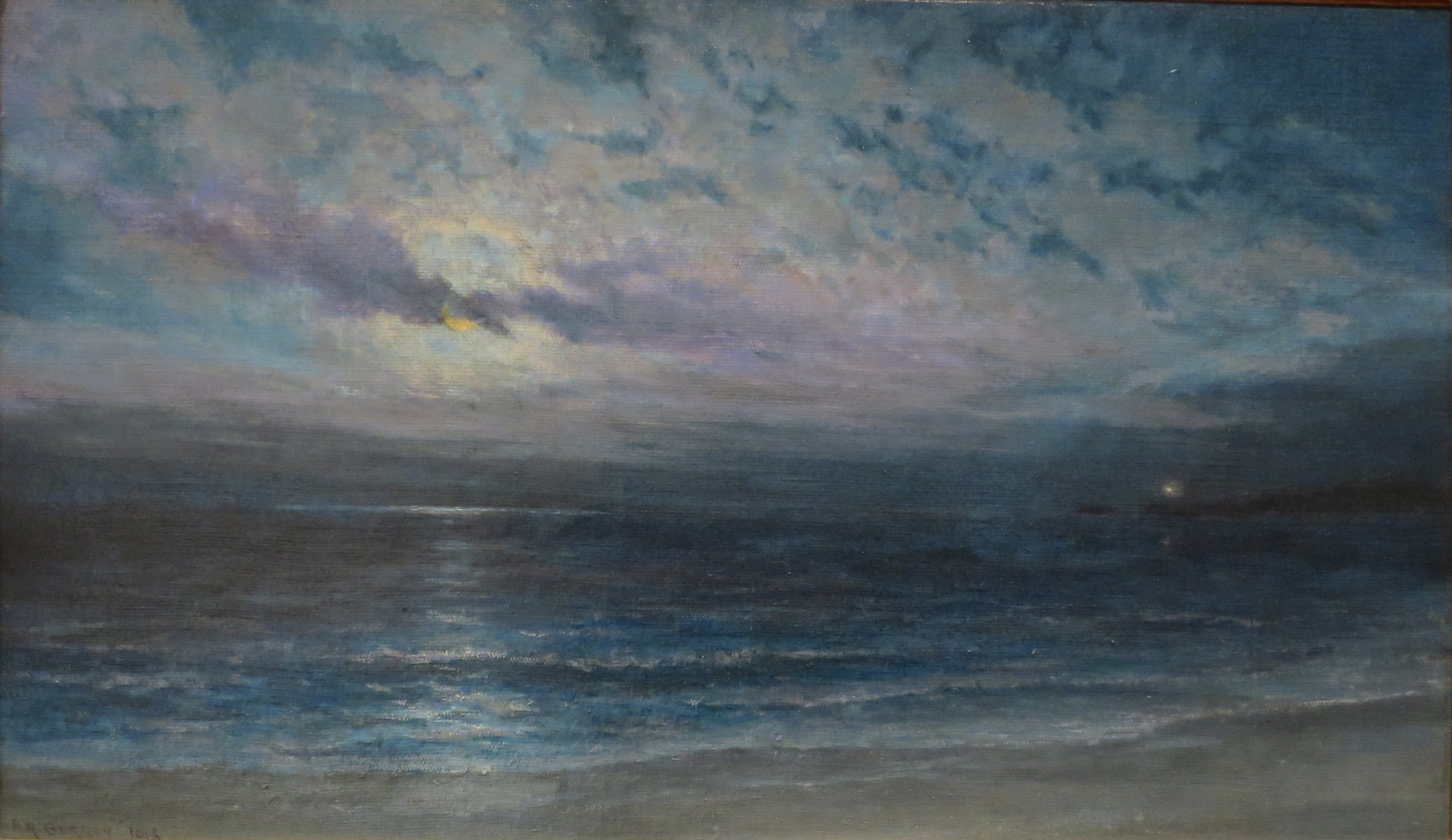
Moonlight on Ocean (Kauai), oil on canvas painting by Alfred Richard Gurrey Sr., c. 1918

Alfred Richard Gurrey Sr. (1852–1944) was an English-born landscape painter who moved to the United States at age 20. In 1900, his employer, Fireman's Fund Insurance Company, transferred him from San Francisco to Hawaii. In Hawaii, he worked as an insurance adjuster and was secretary of the Board of Fire Underwriters of the Territory of Hawaii. Although without formal art training, he painted Hawaiian landscapes and opened an art and antiques store in Honolulu. Gurrey was a member of the Kilohana Art League. In 1916, he retired from the Board of Fire Underwriters and moved to Kauai, where he continued to paint. His son, Alfred Richard Gurrey Jr. (1874–1928) and daughter-in-law, Caroline Haskins Gurrey (1875–1927), were photographers active in Hawaii.

In 1996, Alfred Gurrey’s daughter Florence and her husband Carl Bayer donated 30 of Alfred R. Gurrey Sr.’s paintings to the Kauai Museum in Lihue, Hawaii. His painting Moonlight on Ocean (Kauai), c. 1918, is in the collection of the Hawaii State Art Museum
