= Dorothy Stanton Wise =

Deaf British sculptor

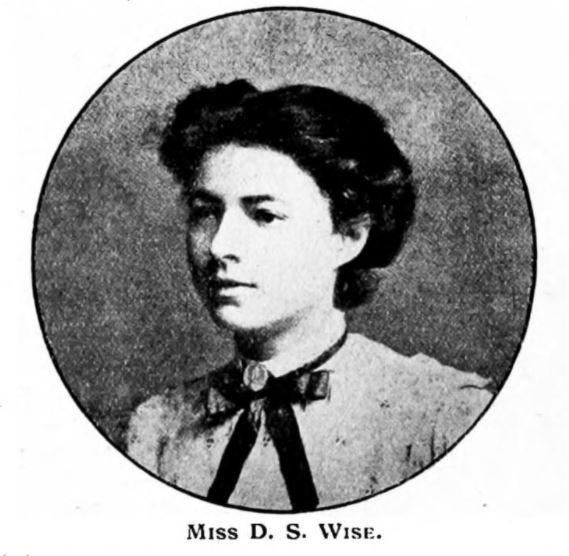
- Born: Dorothea Mary Stanton Wise; 20 October 1879; Dover, England
- Died: 25 December 1918 (aged 39); London, England
- Known for: sculpture

Dorothy Stanton Wise (20 October 1879 – 25 December 1918) was a British sculptor. Wise studied at the Royal College of Art under Édouard Lantéri and created sculptures and medallions that were sold to members of the British royal family. Deaf from an early age, she overcame significant challenges to earn an education unusual for a woman at the time and build a career based on her artistic talent.

== Early life and education ==
Dorothea Mary Stanton Wise was born on 20 October 1879 in Dover. She was one of four children and her parents ran a boys' boarding school. Her parents discovered Dorothy was deaf when she was two years old.

As a child Wise was primarily taught by her mother, but attended a hearing kindergarten to learn drawing and manners, where her artistic ability was made clear. When Wise was seventeen years old she moved with her parents to Hendon. Dorothy was sent to the College of the Deaf in Fitzroy Square every spring to improve her lipreading skills. When Wise decided she wanted to pursue sculpture as a profession, her family assisted her in learning the technical skills necessary to study at the Royal College of Art; her father taught artistic perspective, her mother developed studies in anatomical art, and her younger brother collaborated with her in geometric drawing.

Wise earned a free scholarship at the Royal College of Art for three years. She studied at the college's sculpture studio under artist Édouard Lantéri for five years. Her first exhibit at the academy was a large panel sculpture titled The Wings of the Morning, featuring the Greek goddess Demeter; when the purchaser arranged for the piece to be delivered, he was surprised that the sculptor was a woman. In 1906 she earned her sculpture degree, the only woman that year to earn that degree.

== Career and later life ==
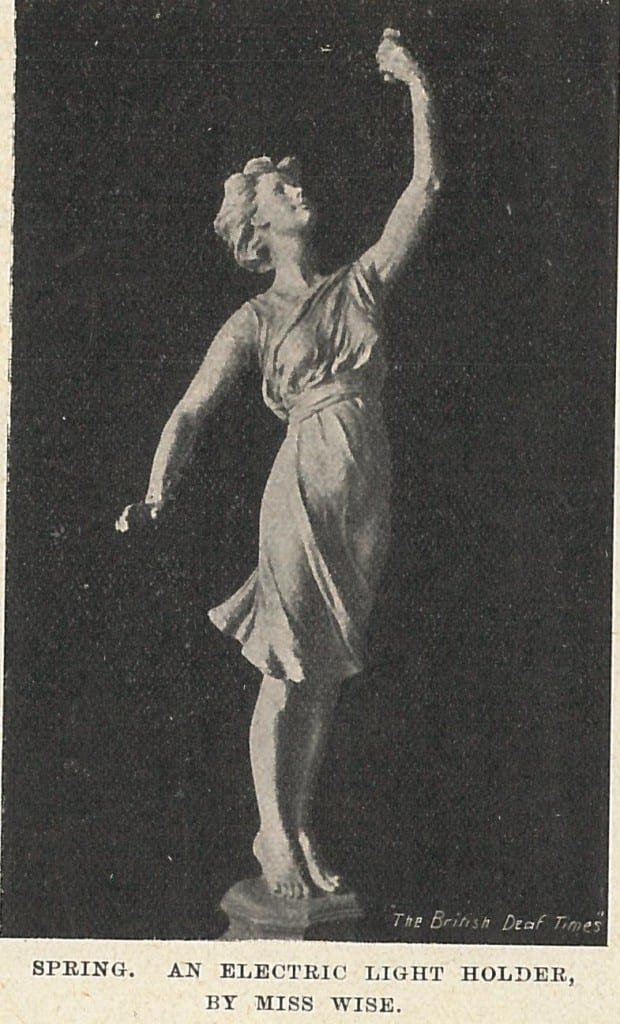
Spring. An Electric Light Holder, by Miss Wise (Dorothy Stanton Wise)

After leaving the college, Wise worked on commissions in multiple forms, including portraits and architectural drawings. One of her most popular statuettes was an electric light holder titled Spring. Wise was talented in sculpting busts of children as well as historical figures such as Joan of Arc. During World War I, when England was unable to import doll's heads from Germany, Wise modeled patterns of doll's heads for manufacturers. She also created medallions of notable people such as Catherine Isabella Dodd and Bishop John Prideaux. Her design for a memorial to Mrs. Henry Wood was selected by the Mayor of Worcester to be placed in Worcester Cathedral, but the lack of Greek marble due to the war caused delays in production. While she was waiting for large marble blocks to be available, she created smaller sculptures which were sold to dignitaries such as Queen Alexandra and Princess Victoria.

Wise exhibited in at least ten shows, including seven times at the Manchester Art Gallery autumn exhibition. She was commissioned to create works for the 1911 Pageant of Empire at The Crystal Palace. Wise won gold medals at Manchester Art Gallery, the Royal Academy, and Walker Art Gallery in Liverpool.

She published several articles for the British Deaf Times between 1913 and 1916 sharing her accomplishments with the deaf community. She was also interviewed by deaf writer Yvonne Pitrois, saying she had lost out on some commissions when purchasers "had no time to waste for speaking to a deaf person". She continued to attend classes in life drawing and modeling design to keep her skills sharp.

She died on 25 December 1918 at her home in London, perhaps a victim of the 1918 flu epidemic.
