= The Outdoor Circle =

Nonprofit organization in Hawaii

- Formation: 1912; 114 years ago
- Founded at: Honolulu
- Type: Nonprofit organization
- Website: https://www.outdoorcircle.org/

The Outdoor Circle is a nonprofit organization in Hawaii focused on conservationism. The organization was founded in 1912 by a group of seven women including Cherilla Storrs Lowrey with the goal of beautifying Honolulu and opposing the use of billboards in Hawaii; members almost immediately began planting trees with the organization after its establishment, leading the program director to estimate in 2020 that the Circle had planted "tens of thousands of trees" across the state.

== History ==
=== Establishment and early activity ===
The Outdoor Circle was founded in 1912, initially under the auspices of the Kilohana Art League, by a group of seven women including Cherilla Lowrey. The founders' goal was to beautify Honolulu and to oppose the use of billboards in Hawaii. Almost immediately after the Circle was founded, members began planting trees in the state, leading program director Myles Ritchie to estimate in 2020 that the Circle had planted "tens of thousands of trees". The Circle also established public fountains, parks, playgrounds, and gardens, and emphasized the conservation of native trees and shrubs. Many of the Circle's earliest members were wives of wealthy white sugar and lumber executives, like Lowrey, whose husband was president of the Oahu Sugar Company.

Lorrin A. Thurston, owner and publisher of the Pacific Commercial Advertiser, was a supporter of the Circle and allowed them to publish an anti-billboard edition of the newspaper in 1913. In 1926, the Circle purchased the only remaining local billboard company for $4,000 (equivalent to $72,744 in 2025), and shut the business down. In 1927, a ban on billboards was enacted in Hawaii.

=== Late 20th century ===
In 1975, The Outdoor Circle played a key role in the passage of the Exceptional Tree Act, which established legal protections for trees of exceptional age, rarity, and historical or cultural significance in Hawaii. In 1978, lobbying by the Circle led to Diamond Head becoming a state monument, preventing its development.

=== 21st century ===
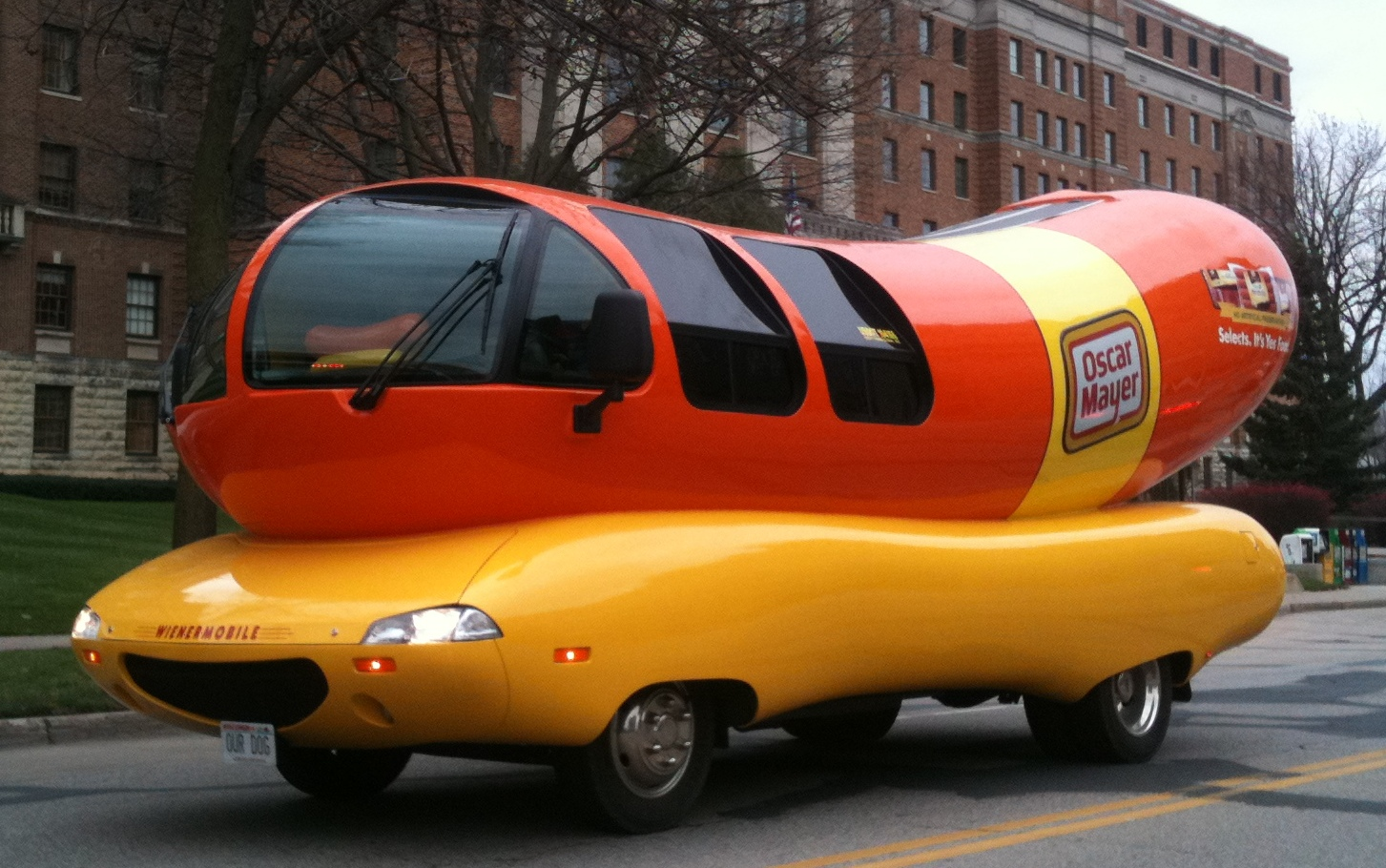
The Wienermobile

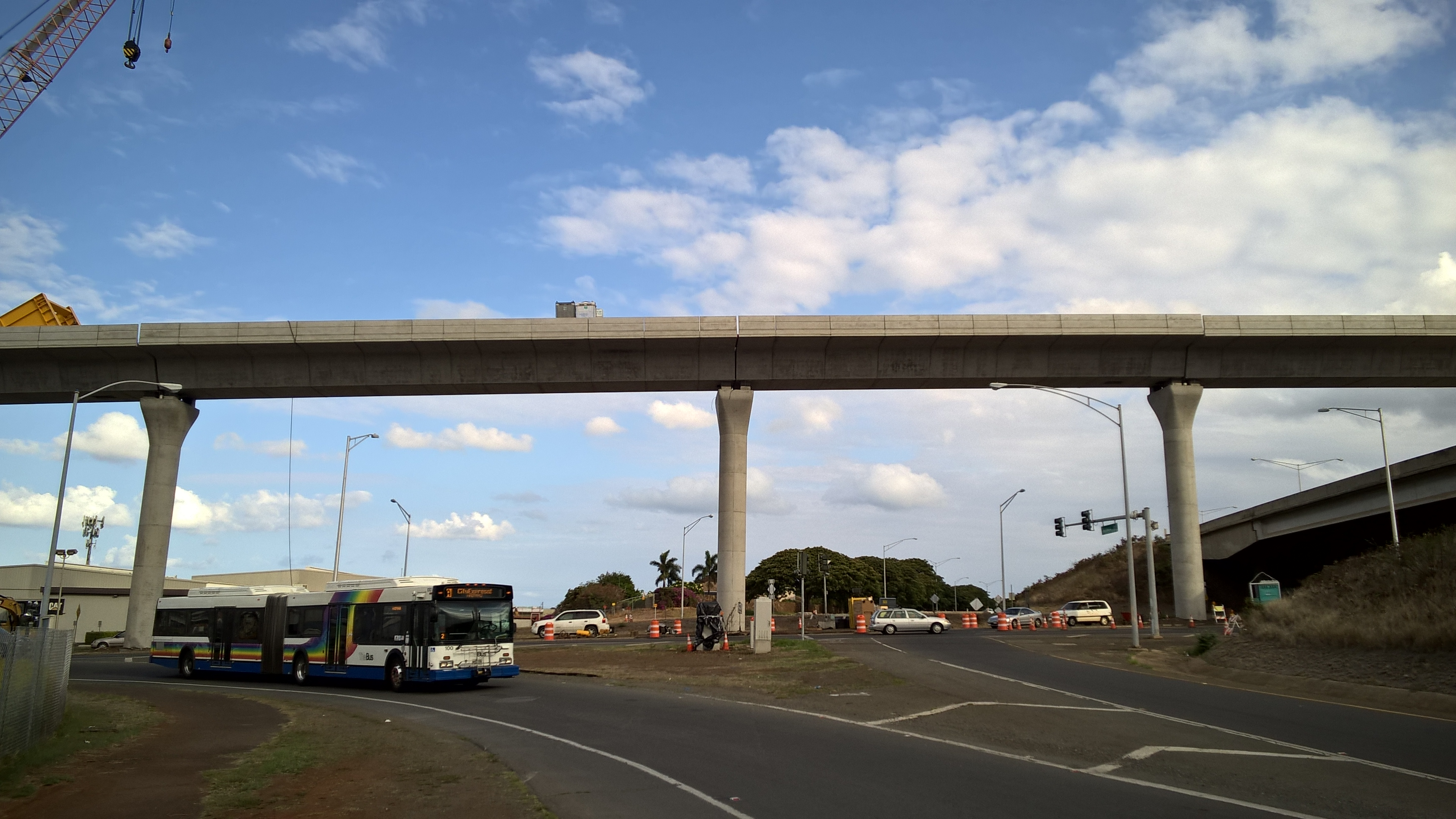
Segments of Skyline track under construction

In 2009, the Circle expressed concern that a visit to Hawaii made by the Wienermobile was a violation of a law against mobile advertising in Hawaii, with director of environmental programs Bob Loy describing the vehicle as "a perfect example of a billboard truck", although no charges were levied against the Wienermobile.

In 2011, the Circle became one of the plaintiffs in a federal lawsuit aiming to halt an elevated rail system project for Skyline from going forward, motivated by a belief that the rail would negatively affect approximately 900 trees and have an additional negative effect on the scenic views in Honolulu; former organization president Susan Spangler stated that "It’ll be so ugly". However, a federal judge greenlit the project in December 2012 along most of its length.

In 2013, the Circle opposed a proposal to put advertisements on Honolulu city buses, arguing that the ads would be a public forum and that they would damage the "natural beauty" of Honolulu. After the organization created a mockup of a Joe Camel cigarette advertisement on a Honolulu bus, intending to point out that advertisements which are used now may be considered unacceptable in the future, then-Mayor of Honolulu Kirk Caldwell accused the Circle of "trying to create fear and misinformation" while Transportation Services Director Michael Formby described the mockup as "offensive [...] because [the Circle] knew we would never do that and yet they put out that press release."
