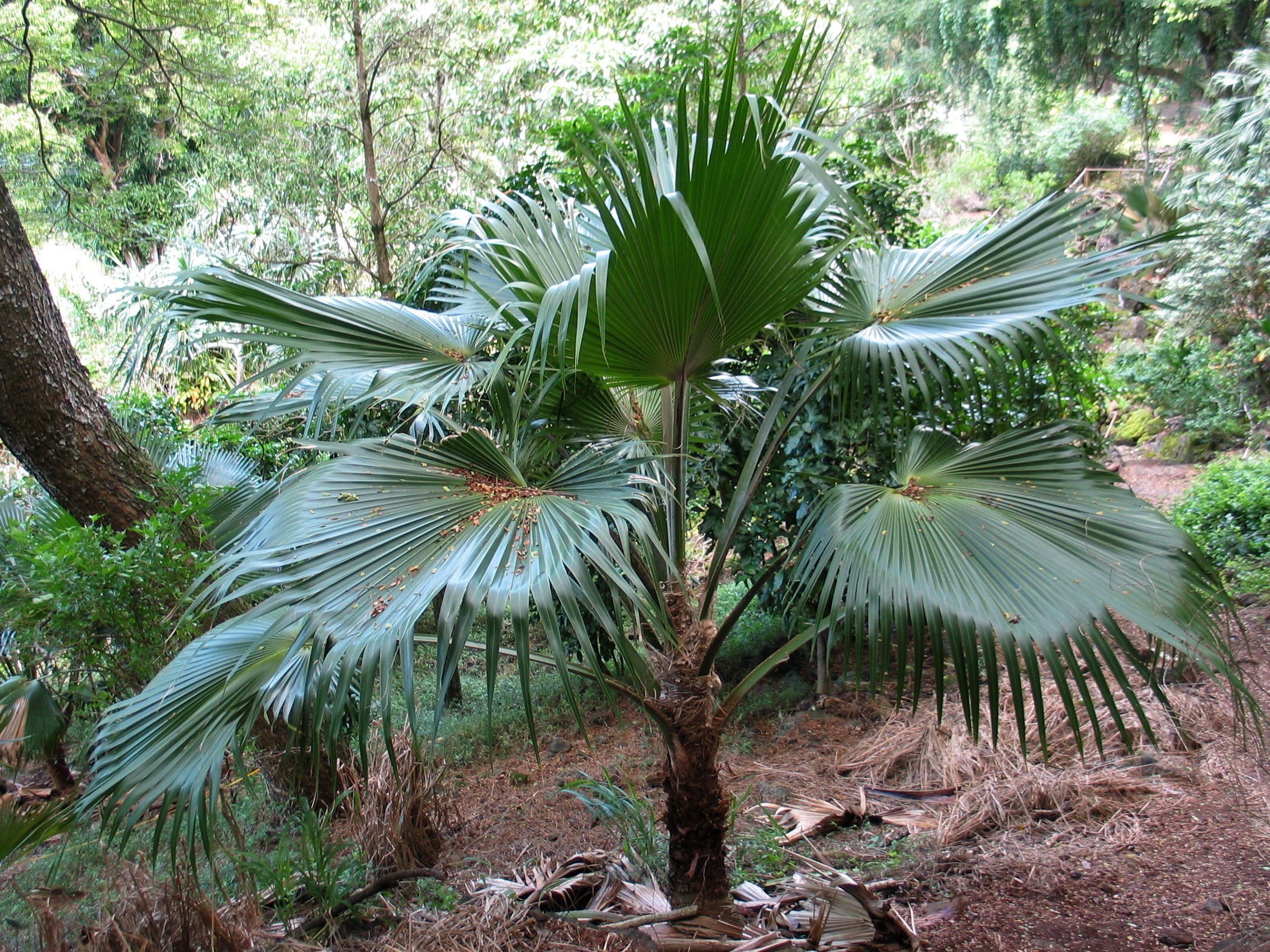

Conservation status
- Vulnerable (IUCN 2.3)

Scientific classification
- Kingdom: Plantae
- Clade: Tracheophytes
- Clade: Angiosperms
- Clade: Monocots
- Clade: Commelinids
- Order: Arecales
- Family: Arecaceae
- Tribe: Trachycarpeae
- Genus: Pritchardia
- Species: P. lowreyana

Binomial name
- Pritchardia lowreyana Rock

= Pritchardia lowreyana =

Molokai pritchardia

Species of palm

Pritchardia lowreyana, the Molokai pritchardia, is a species of fan palm that is endemic to Hawaii in the United States. It is found in mixed mesic and wet forests on the island of Molokaʻi. P. lowreyana reaches a height of 2–4 m (6.6–13.1 ft), and normally grows in gulches and on cliffs. It was named in 1918 for Cherilla Storrs Lowrey (1861–1918), an American clubwoman active in tree-planting and beautification projects around Honolulu.
