= Kilohana Art League =

Honolulu's first art association

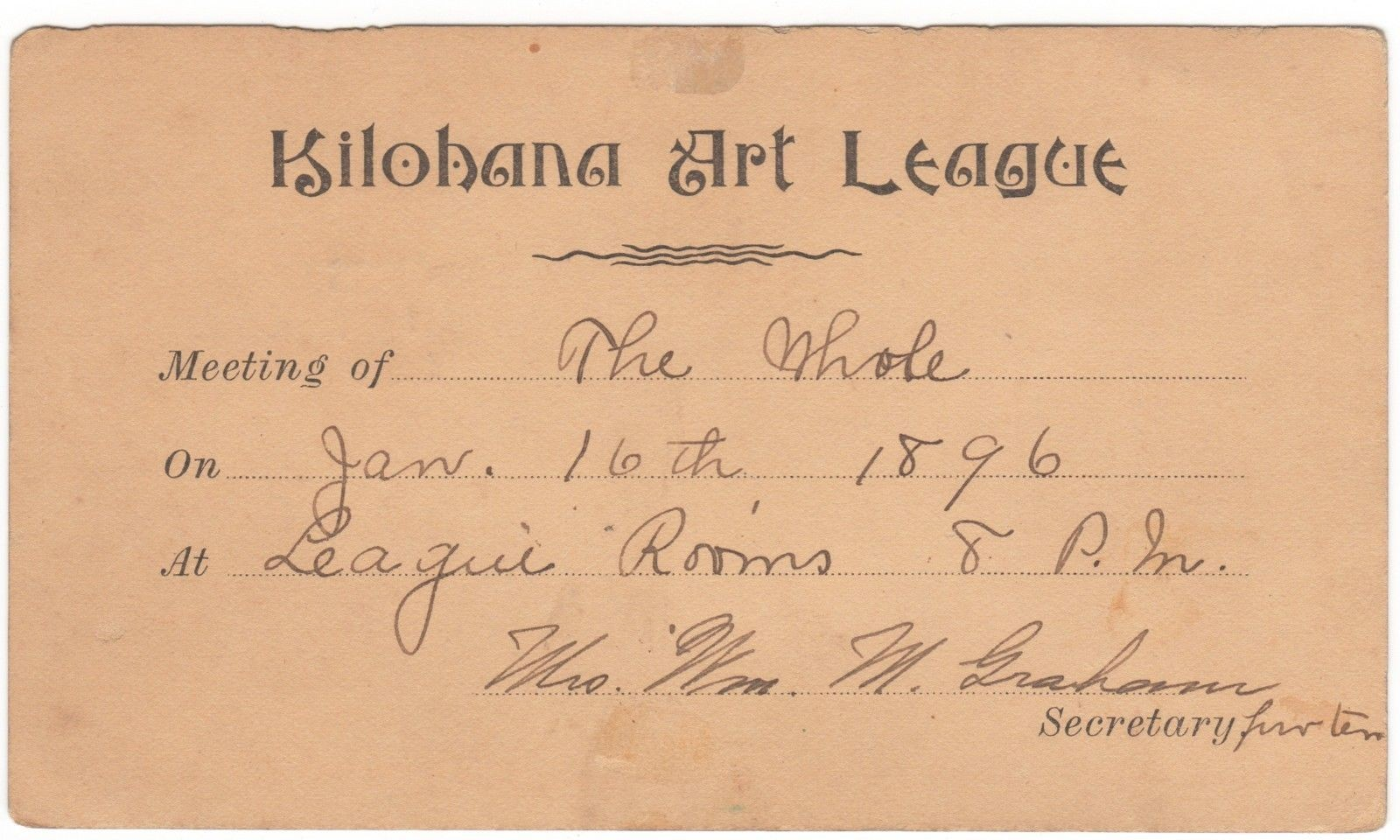
- 1896 meeting card for the Kilohane Art League
- Named after: Kilo, meaning to observe carefully or to spy, and hana, signifying to do or to work
- Formation: May 5, 1894; 132 years ago
- Founders: D. Howard Hitchcock; Allen Hutchinson; W. M. Graham; Annie H. Parke
- Founded at: Honolulu, Hawaii
- Dissolved: 1913; 113 years ago

The Kilohana Art League was formed in 1894 as Honolulu’s first art association. On May 5, 1894, the woodcarver Augusta Graham, the sculptor Allen Hutchinson, and painters D. Howard Hitchcock and Annie H. Park created a forum where local artists could exhibit together and share ideas. Other members included Alfred Richard Gurrey, Sr. and Bessie Wheeler.

"Kilohana" is a compound word derived from two Hawaiian language words: kilo meaning to observe carefully or to spy out, and hana, meaning work. The Kilohana Art League was disbanded in 1913, and its funds were transferred to The Outdoor Circle.

== Organization ==
The League was organized into sub-organizations known as "circles", such as the Pictorial and Plastic Circle of the Kilohana Art League, the Dramatic Circle of the Kilohana Art League, the Musical Circle of the Kilohana Art League, the Literary Circle of the Kilohana Art League, and the Outdoor Circle of the Kilohana Art League.

== Sources ==
- "The Hawaiian Annual" (PDF). The Hawaiian Annual. Honolulu: Thos. C. Thrum: 120, 190. 1900. OCLC 925532900.
- Rodgers, C. T. (1896). "Kilohana Art League" (PDF). The Hawaiian Annual. Honolulu: Press Publishing Co. Steam Print.: 136–140. OCLC 925532900.
- Severson, Don R; Horikawa, Michael D; Saville, Jennifer (2002). Finding paradise : island art in private collections, Honolulu Academy of Arts. Honolulu: Honolulu Academy of Arts, University of Hawaii Press. pp. xxiv–xxv, 99, 104, 111, 210. ISBN 9780824826574. OCLC 49553660.
