= Allen Hutchinson =

English sculptor

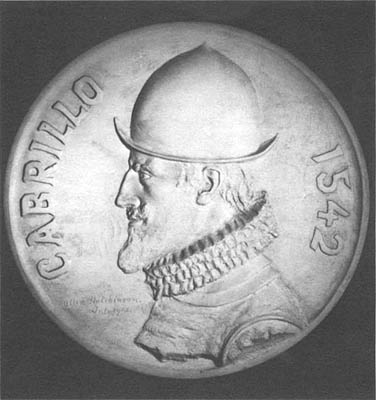
Juan Cabrillo Plaque by Allen Hutchinson

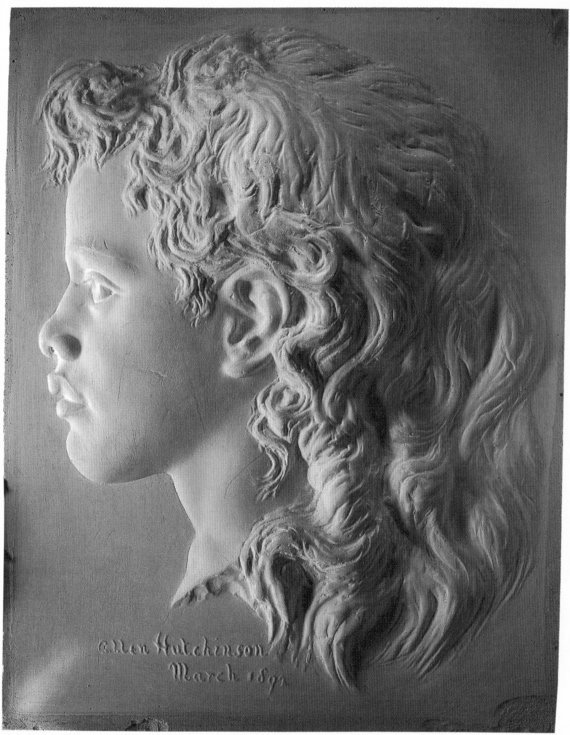
Profile of a Young Hawaiian Girl, plaster carving by Allen Hutchinson, 1892

Allen Hutchinson (8 January 1855 – 28 July 1929 London) was an English sculptor.

Hutchinson was born in Staffordshire, England. He trained in London under Édouard Lantéri. He travelled to Canada and California in 1886. In 1888, he moved to Hawaii, where he modeled busts of King Kalākaua, Robert Louis Stevenson, and president of the Republic of Hawaii Sanford B. Dole. While in Hawaii, Hutchinson married, and the couple had a daughter. In 1894, he was one of the founders of the Kilohana Art League. In 1899, Hutchinson and his family left Hawaii for Australia and New Zealand. He returned to the United States in 1902, and moved back to London in 1928. He died in London on 28 July 1929.

The Beinecke Rare Book and Manuscript Library (Yale University), the Bishop Museum (Honolulu), the Honolulu Museum of Art, the San Diego Historical Society, Stevenson Society of America and the Art Gallery of New South Wales (Sydney) are among the public collections holding sculptures by Allen Hutchinson.
