= Lilian Simpson =

British artist (c.1871–1897)

M. Lilian Simpson (c.1871–1897) was a British sculptor.

== Biography ==
During the 1890s, Simpson was a student at the National Art Training School, NATS, in London where she was taught by the sculptor Édouard Lantéri. Among her contemporaries at NATS, which became the Royal College of Art in 1896, were a number of other notable female sculptors including Margaret Giles, Ruby Levick, Esther Moore, Florence Steele and Lucy Gwendolen Williams. In 1894 Simpson won a gold medal and travelling scholarship in the National Art Competition for a silver low relief book cover. While still a student, Simpson had two pieces of work, including a bronze casket, shown at the Royal Academy in London and also exhibited with the Arts and Crafts Exhibition Society.In 1896 and 1897 her work was also included in exhibitions in Leeds and Liverpool. In 1897 she used the travelling scholarship she had won in 1894 to travel and study in Italy. There she contracted typhoid fever and died later that year aged 26. The British Library now holds her 1894 book cover.
