= Archer Street =

Street in Central London

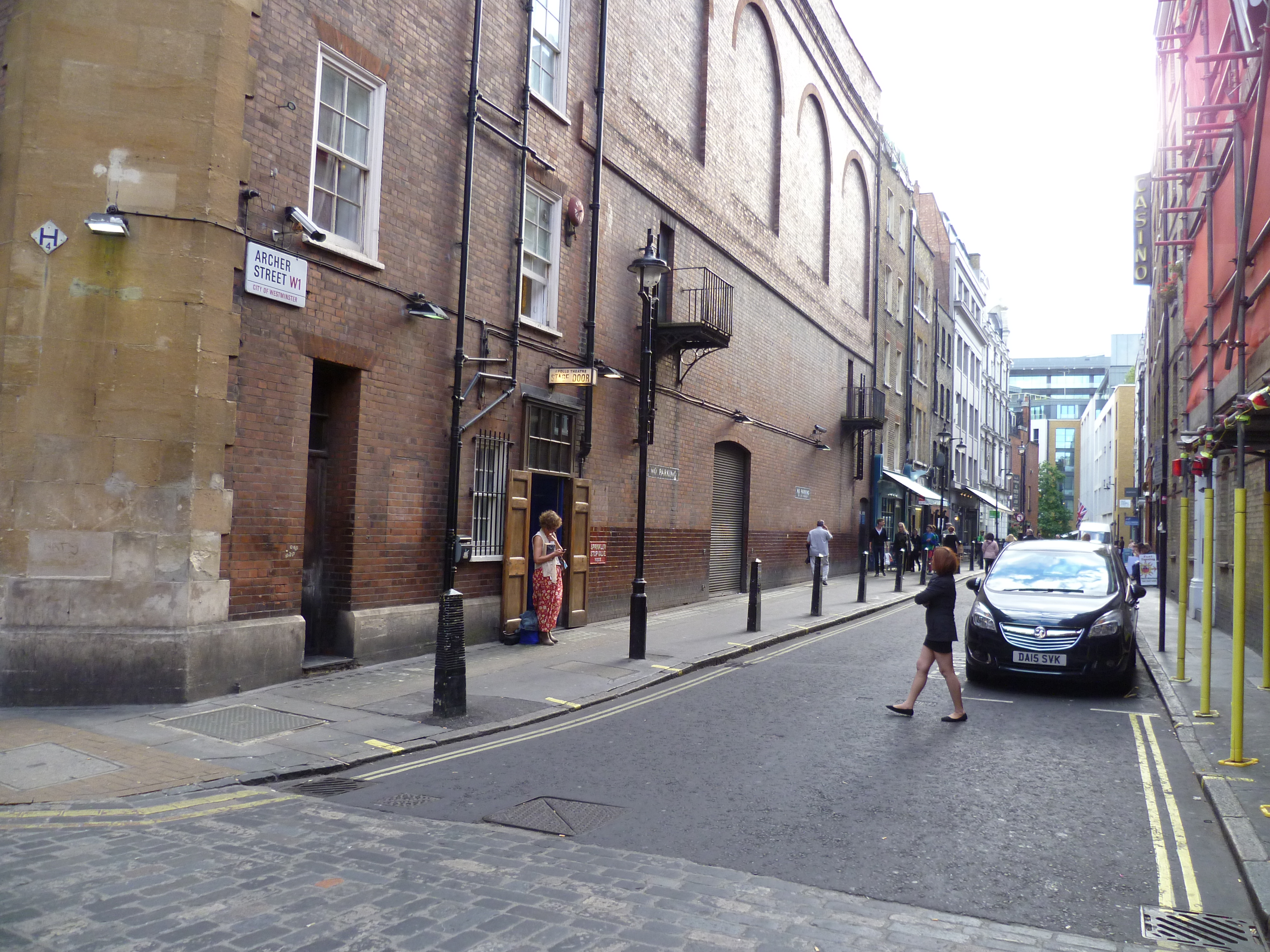
Archer Street, London W1

Archer Street is a short street in the Soho district of Central London that connects Rupert Street with Great Windmill Street. It became famous as a meeting place for jazz and dance band musicians from the 1920s and into the 1950s.

== History ==
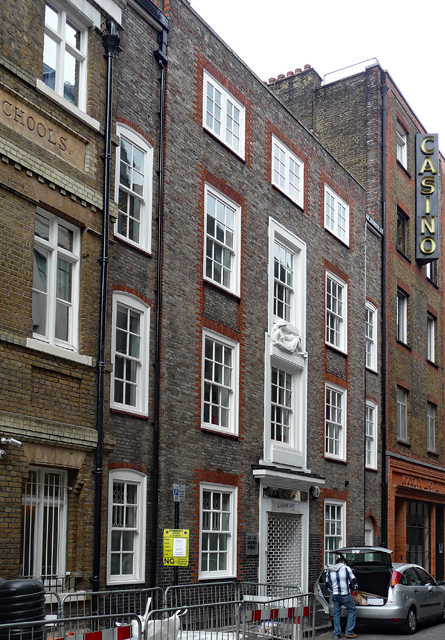
13-14 Archer Street

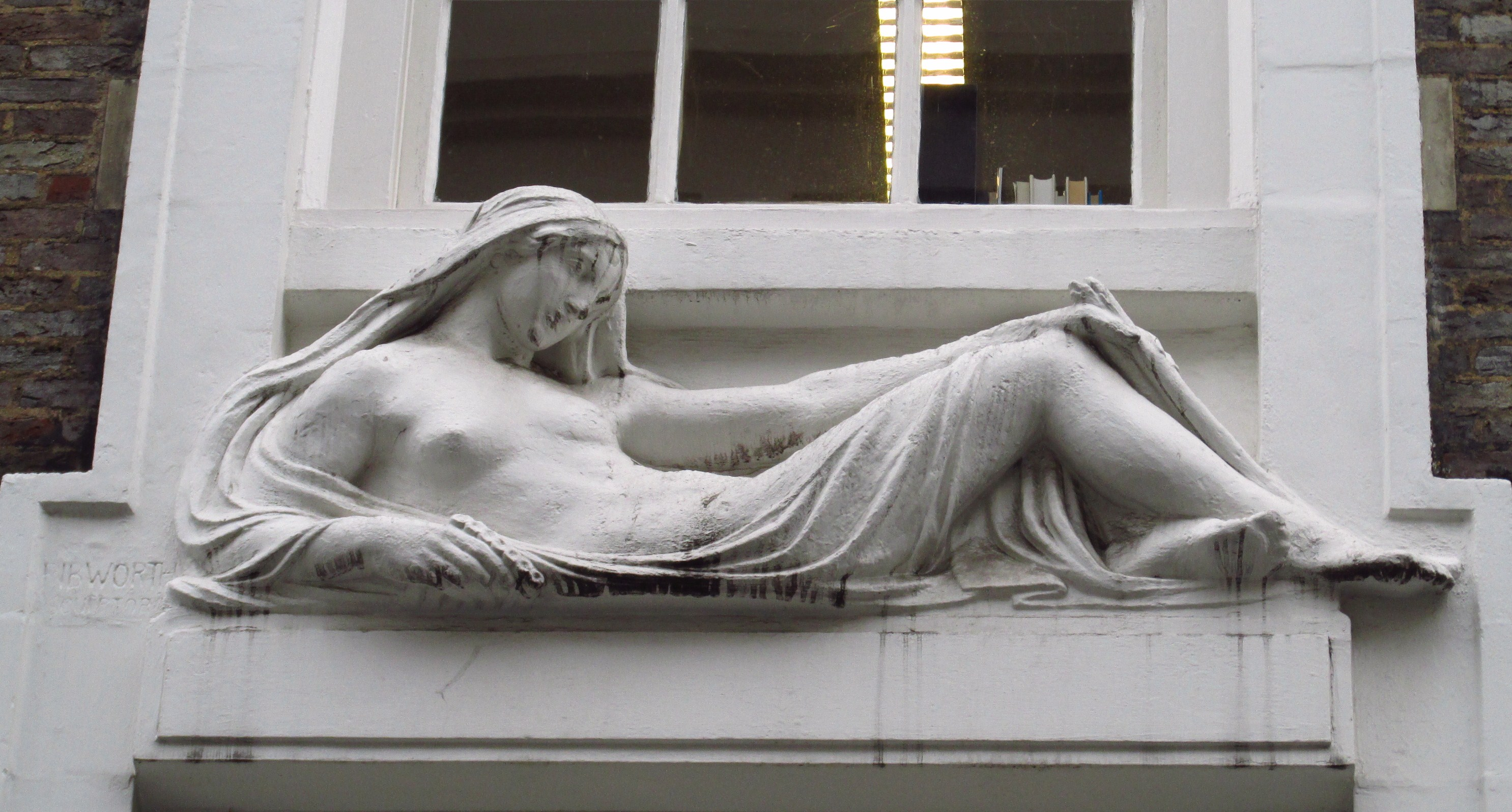
Euterpe by Charles James Pibworth, 13-14 Archer Street

The earliest reference (as "Arch Street") is found in the parish rate books of 1675. By the 1740s the name had changed to Archer Street. Originally (until the 1830s) it was connected to Rupert Street only by a narrow, right-angled passage.

At the Red Lion pub (built in 1793, on the corner of Archer Street and Great Windmill Street) Karl Marx and Frederick Engels lectured on Communism and first presented what was to become the outline of the Communist Manifesto, published in 1848. The pub closed in 2005. The Windmill Theatre, best known for its nude tableaux vivants, opened in 1931 and lasted until 1964. It was housed in a block of buildings that also includes the Apollo and Lyric theatres, whose stage doors open onto Archer Street.

Number 6 dates from the mid-18th century. The facades of Number 7 and Number 16 are circa 1800. 9-11 Archer Street - Archer Street Chambers - was built in 1882/3 as dwellings for artisans: a plaque marks its renovation, completed in 1981. Number 12 was Giovanni Defendi's delicatessen in the 1880s, housed the Italia Conti drama school from 1945 to 1972, and opened as the Bocca di Lupo restaurant in 2009. The London Orchestral Association building (1912, by architects Henry Percy Adams and Charles Holden) spans Numbers 13 and 14. The relief Euterpe (1912) by Charles James Pibworth (1878-1958) is on its facade.

== Jazz ==
From the early 1920s - especially on Mondays - jazz and dance band musicians began to gather on Archer Street to socialise, to look for engagements, and to collect pay from previous engagements. It was, according to Jim Godbolt, "both social club and labour exchange, and the latter function was exploited by the 'fixers' for bands ranging from trios to thirty-strong orchestras for TV extravaganzas".

Musicians were attracted to Archer Street by the numerous local drinking establishments nearby, and by its proximity to theatres and clubs where immediate work might be found. But it has also been suggested that the exclusive nature of the London Orchestral Association on Archer Street (the LOA merged with the Musician's Union in 1921), and its initial reluctance to admit members of the jazz and dance bands that emerged in the 1920s, led to these musicians being forced to meet outside or nearby. The Archer Street gathering served as a resource for hiring musicians to meet the "Charleston craze" of the 1920s, and later for the big bands playing the dance halls, society balls and cruise ships. It also helped maintain a sense of solidarity among the many musicians who found themselves unemployed during the 1930s depression.

In 1948 British bebop musicians founded Club Eleven at 41 Great Windmill Street, a minute's walk away from Archer Street. The Harmony Inn, in the middle of Archer Street, was opened in 1950 by Czech émigré George Siptak. It was an all-night greasy-spoon cafe, and was frequented by jazz musicians and criminals. Ronnie Scott, Peter King, Benny Green, Derek Humble, Tony Crombie and Jimmy Deuchar were among the musicians who conceived the idea of forming a nine-piece co-operative band there in the early 1950s – a pivotal moment in British jazz.

By the end of the 1950s, the number of musicians gathering in Archer Street had declined drastically. Even so, in 1961 the London police force felt it necessary to order a crackdown on musicians still meeting there on Mondays between 2 pm and 5 pm. Gordon Thompson has described how the street continued to have a role to play in the early days of British rock during the 1960s.

'Archer Street jazz' was sometimes used as a derogatory term when jazz split into the revivalist and modernist camps after the war, intended to refer to a scorned middle ground between the two: jazz played for commercial gain rather than artistic authenticity or conviction.

== Film location ==
The BBC documentary The Street, first broadcast in 1985, compiled clips of Archer Street and many of its characters, taken from 8mm film shot in the 1950s by the trumpeter and pianist Denis Rose.

The 1949 film Murder at the Windmill was the first film to show footage inside the Windmill Theatre. There is also footage of Archer Street at the stage door.

== See also ==
- Great Windmill Street
- Club Eleven
- Ronnie Scott's Jazz Club
- Rupert Street
