= Bust of John Dalton =

Sculpture by Ruby Levick

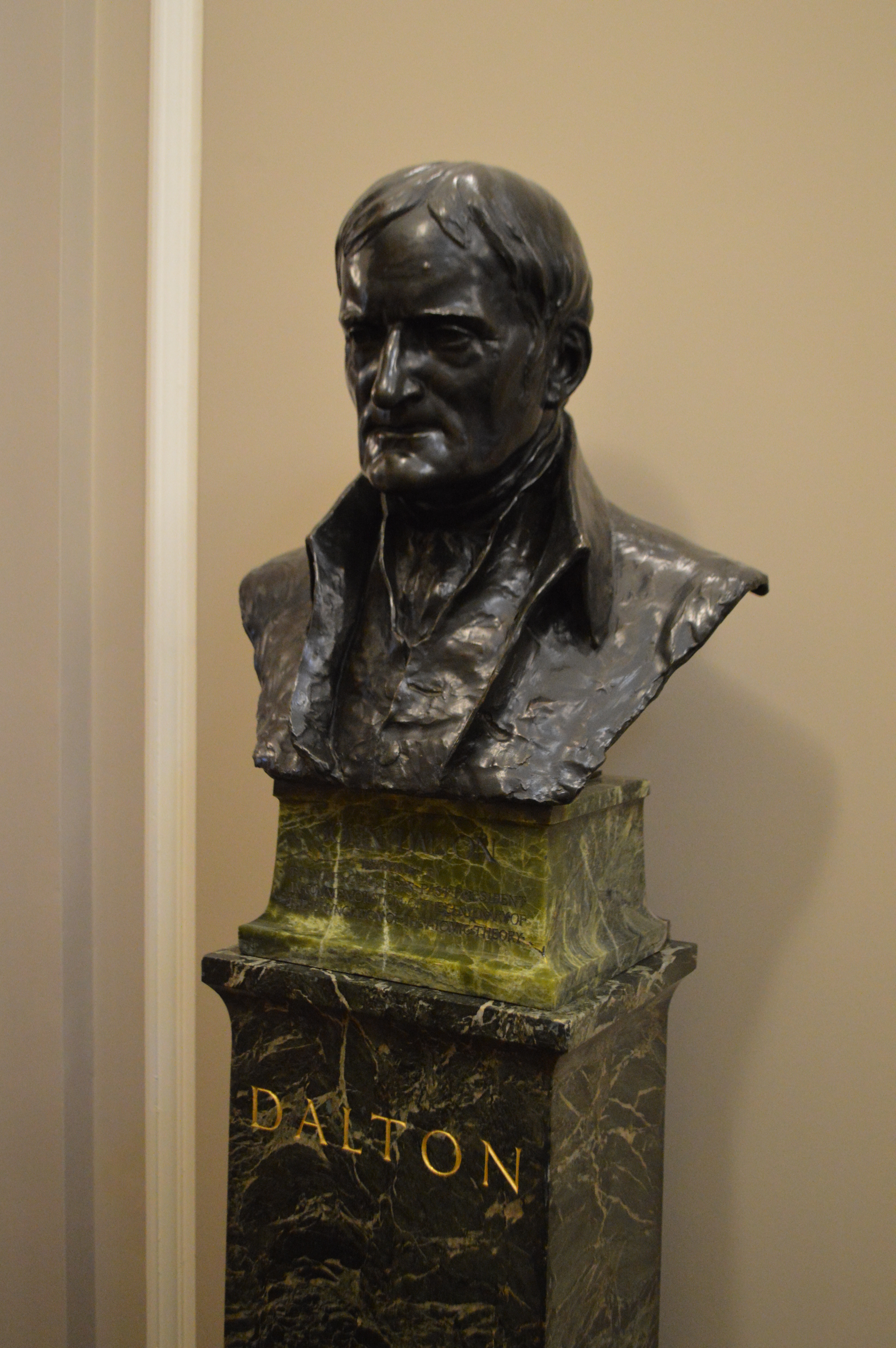
The bust at the Royal Society of Chemistry in Burlington House

The bronze bust of John Dalton located along the corridor on the first floor of Burlington House, London, was created by Ruby Levick. Ruby also executed the bust of Humphry Davy at Burlington House.

It was donated to the Chemical Society in 1903 by its former president Sir Thomas Edward Thorpe (1845–1925), as attested by the inscription engraved on the bust's base: "John Dalton presented by T.E. Thorpe CB. L.L.D. F.R.S. past president in commemoration of the centenary of the enunciation of the atomic theory".

A copy of his accompanying letter was printed in the Proceedings of the Chemical Society in 1903 and read out by president professor William A. Tilden:

"The bronze is the work of Miss Levick, who is already favourably known to the Society by her reproduction of the bust of Davy in their possession. Of the artistic merits of her present work others must be the judge, but I may be permitted here to express my indebtedness to her for the skill and conscientious care with which she has striven to make a faithful and adequate presentment of the grand old philosopher".

John Dalton (1766–1844) was an English chemist best known for his development of atomic theory.

== See also ==
- List of artworks in the collection of the Royal Society of Chemistry
