= Thomas Nelson Maclean =

English sculptor (1845-1894)

- Born: 1845; Deptford, Kent, England
- Died: 1894 (aged 48–49)
- Known for: Sculpture
- Movement: New Sculpture

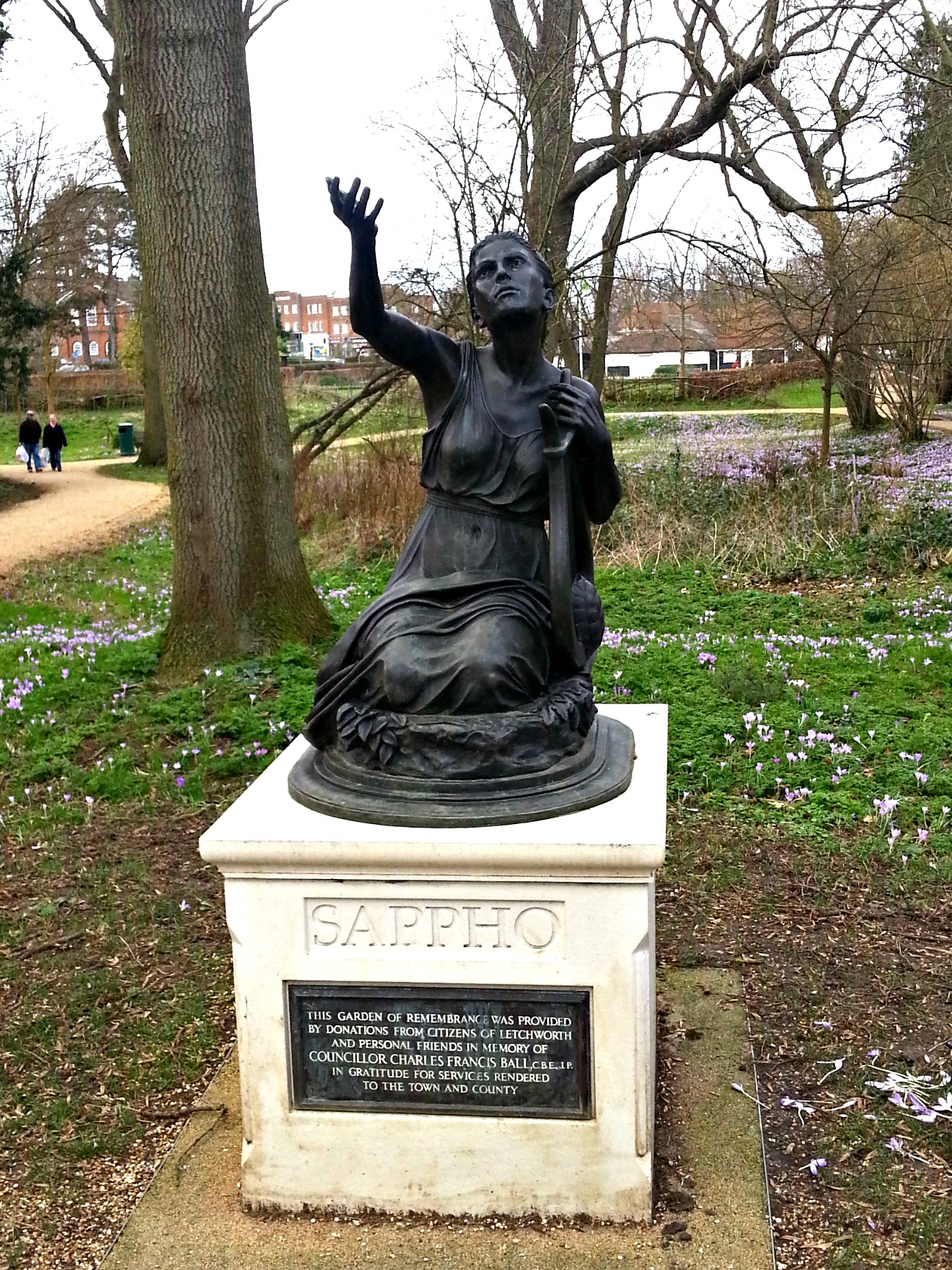
Sappho by Thomas Nelson Maclean in Howard Gardens, Letchworth Garden City

Thomas Nelson Maclean (1845 – 1894) was an English sculptor based in London. He was considered by Edmund Gosse as an early exponent of the "New Sculpture" movement.

== Biography ==
Thomas Maclean was born to engineer Horatio Nelson Maclean in Deptford, then part of Kent. He studied in France under Albert-Ernest Carrier-Belleuse and at the École des Beaux-Arts which would later have an influence on him in his style, congruent with the emerging "New Sculpture" movement. Other influences included the painters Lawrence Alma-Tadema and Albert Moore.

Maclean briefly worked for Henry Hugh Armstead before working independently. Maclean exhibited at many major London venues such as the Royal Academy, the Grosvenor Gallery, the New Gallery and with the Royal Society of British Artists at their Suffolk Street Gallery from 1870 to 1891. His output focused on figurative sculpture; the influence of contemporaries such as Lawrence Alma-Tadema and Albert Moore are seen in many of his works, notably his depictions of women in classical dress.
