= Bocca di Lupo =

Coordinates: 51.51165°N 0.13395°W

- Interactive map of Bocca di Lupo

Restaurant information
- Established: 2008
- Owners: Jacob Kenedy, Victor Hugo
- Food type: Italian cuisine
- Location: 12 Archer Street, London, W1D 7BB, United Kingdom
- Website: www.boccadilupo.com

Bocca di Lupo is a small Italian restaurant on Archer Street in London's Soho district rated the best London restaurant in Time Out magazine's 2009 listing. It won "Best Wine List" award in Tatler magazine's 2013 restaurant awards, as well as a Michelin Guide "Bib Gourmand" award. The Time Out award was attributed partly to the restaurant's bargain prices, which increased significantly as its popularity grew. Bocca di Lupo serves cuisine from a variety of Italian regions, with each dish's origin labelled on the menu.

== Founding ==
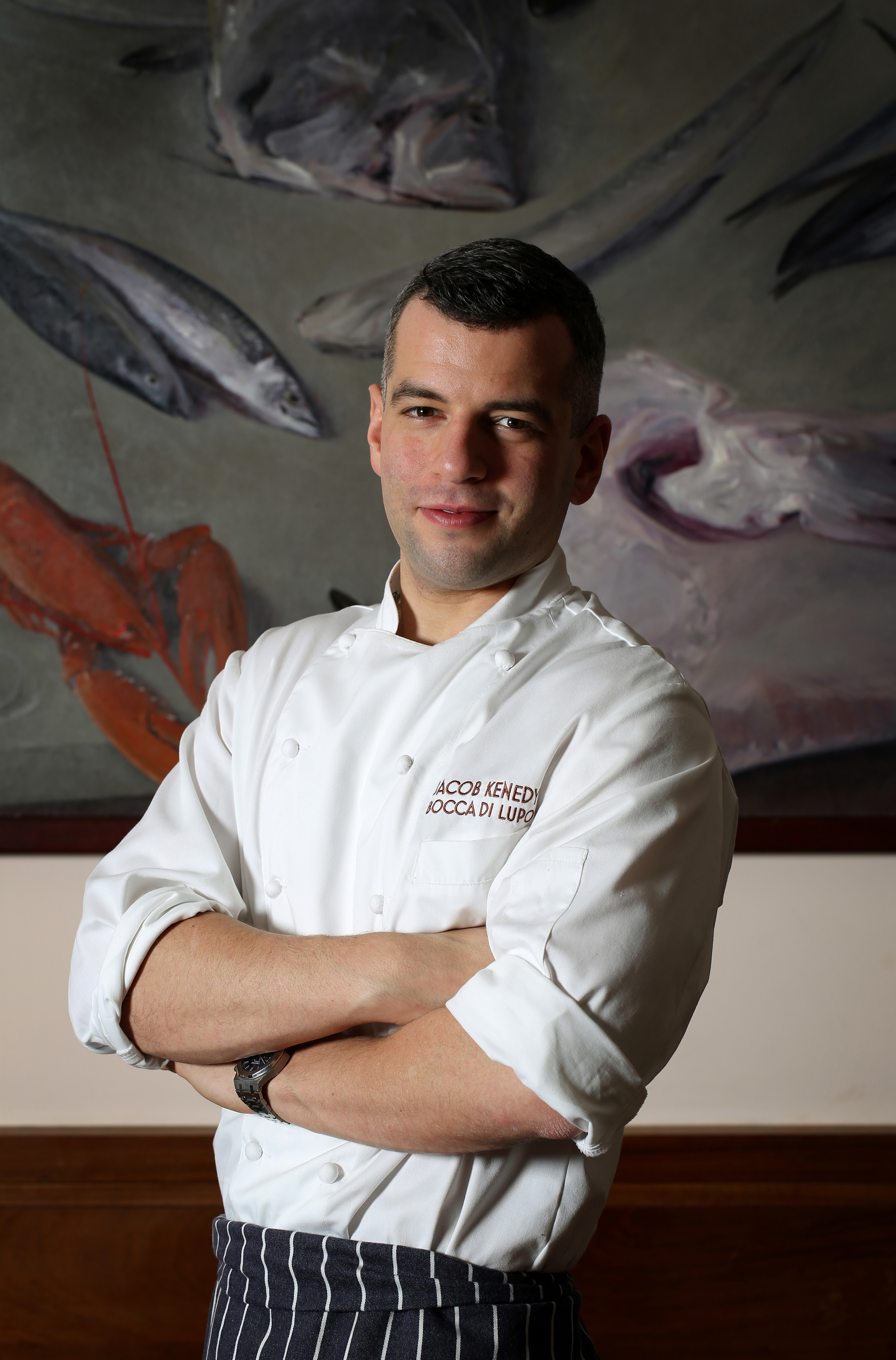
Jacob Kenedy, chef-owner of Bocca Di Lupo, in front of Haidee Becker's paintings of fish and shellfish

The restaurant was started by chef Jacob Kenedy and his business partner Victor Hugo in 2008, with funding and advice from Kenedy's entrepreneur uncle David Cleevely. Kenedy, who attended the University of Cambridge, and Hugo had both worked at Moro restaurant in London's Exmouth Market before starting Bocca di Lupo. The restaurant was so successful that it was described as "profitable within weeks" despite, or because of, opening at "the height of the credit crunch".

Bocca di Lupo means "wolf mouth"; in Italian the phrase is used to refer to either a trou de loup (a defensive obstacle), a type of pastry, or a basement ventilation opening. The restaurant owners use it to refer to the related Italian saying in bocca al lupo, a traditional Italian equivalent of the English saying "break a leg"; Bocca di Lupo's website is also headed by the English motto "For when you're hungry like the wolf".

== Critical reception ==
The Time Out award was attributed to the restaurant's strong menu, good food and good value for money. Time Out's food and drink editor Guy Dimond said that previous winners of the listing missed out in 2009 because that year's awards focused more on affordable eating experiences, which favoured Bocca di Lupo. The menu's listing of regions of origin for each dish drew appreciation from one critic for the level of detail, but was seen by another as revealing a lack of authentic Italian devotion to a single region. The same critic also derided etched panels with Italian wording that "like a Peckham greengrocer, boast a rogue apostrophe".

In 2012 the menu was described as "changing daily". Noted were the pork and foie gras sausages, and sanguinaccio dolce, a dessert of chocolate pudding flavoured with pig's blood.

Bocca di Lupo's early critical popularity, which also included winning a Michelin Guide "Bib Gourmand" award,^{[2]} was described by some critics as having negatively impacted the experience, with tables very hard to book and prices increasing from the bargain levels that had contributed to the initial success – in 2010 it was described by The Observer as "not cheap, but worth every penny." The restaurant went on to win the "Best Wine List" award in Tatler magazine's 2013 restaurant awards.^{[1]}

== Site and layout ==
Diners can sit at the bar and watch the chefs at work.

Cleevely had purchased the freehold on the small site for about two and a half million pounds, taking the view that if a prime site was required, the huge risks of founding a new restaurant meant that it was better to own the property asset outright rather than enter into an expensive and difficult-to-end lease. The restaurant has a long Carrara marble bar for lighter meals, overlooking an open-plan kitchen, with the windowless main dining room at the back as well as a separate room that can be booked for private functions. It is decorated with large still-life paintings by Kenedy's mother, artist Haide Becker. Bocca di Lupo has been described as "small and slightly chaotic", with only fourteen tables.

== Supplier relations ==
In 2013 Kenedy publicly smashed five bottles of red wine from one of his suppliers, Italian fine wine merchant Fulvio Bressan, on the street in front of the restaurant, in protest at a Facebook post by Bressan which used the racist epithet sporca scimmia nera about Italy's recently appointed minister for integration Cécile Kyenge. Kenedy described Bressan as "not only a racist" but "also a spineless one" after Bressan deleted the post to minimise its impact. Bocca di Lupo no longer stocks wine from Bressan.

== Related ventures ==
=== Gelupo ===
Jacob Kenedy opened an ice-cream parlour called Gelupo in 2010 opposite the restaurant on Archer Street. The gelateria has appeared on 'best ice creams in London' lists, including Time Out and the Evening Standard. The blood orange granita was cited as one of the top dishes in London in 2012 and they regularly produce unusual flavours such as the Coronation Chicken gelato for the Queen's Diamond Jubilee. Prior to opening Gelupo, Jacob Kenedy learnt gelato-making at Gelatauro in Bologna.

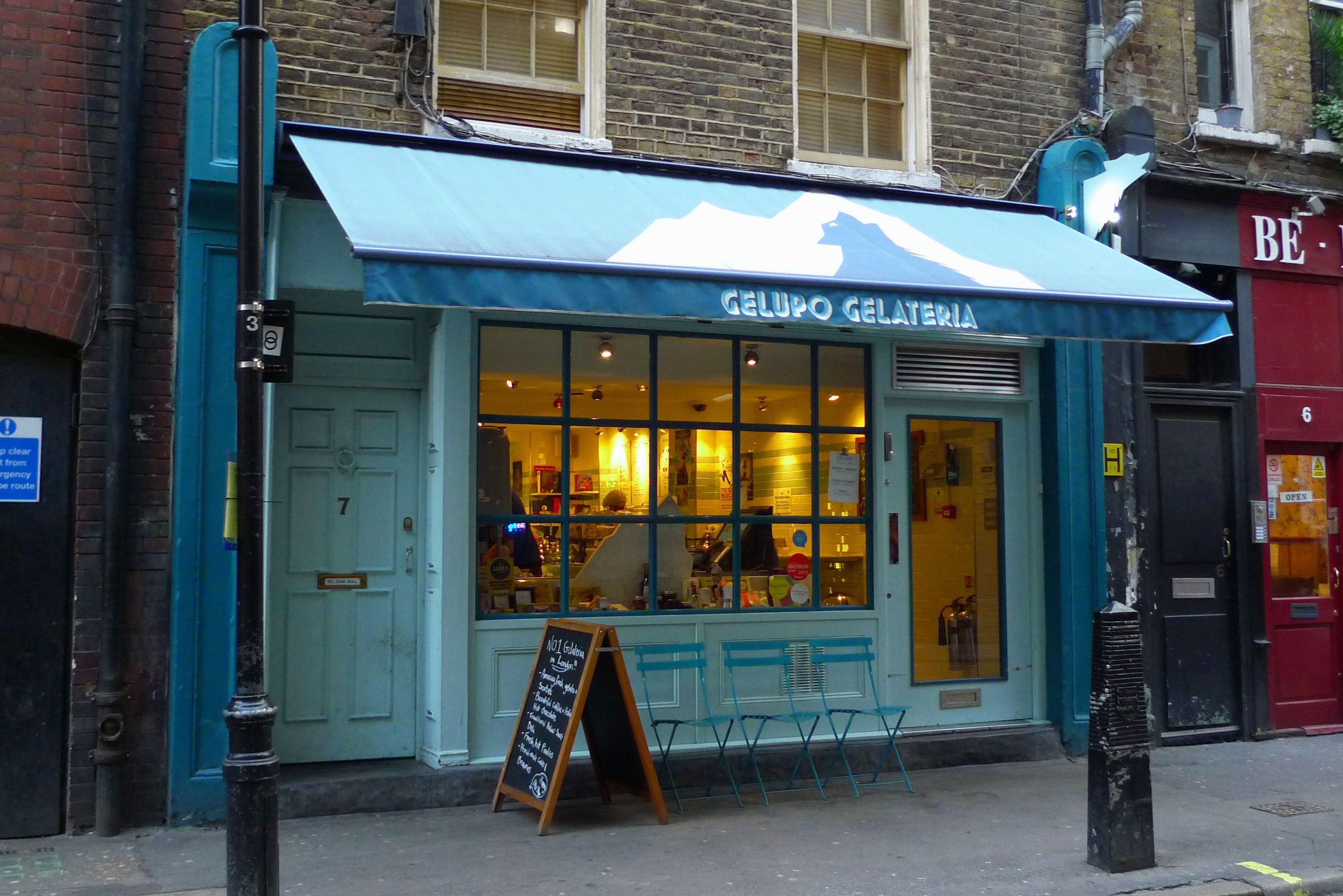
Gelupo Gelateria was the team's second venture, opposite their first.

=== VICO ===
In September 2015 the team behind Bocca Di Lupo opened an Italian street food counter-service restaurant called VICO on Cambridge Circus. The concept changed in December 2015 into a Southern Italian table-service restaurant, which subsequently won a Bib Gourmand in the Michelin Guide.
