= Margaret Giles =

British painter, sculptor and medallist

Margaret May Giles RWA FRIBA (20 May 1868 – 31 March 1949) was a British painter, sculptor, and medallist. She was a member of the Society of Medallists and exhibited at their first exhibition in 1898 which was held at the Dutch Gallery in London, where her piece "Two Medals" was favorably critiqued.

== Biography ==
Giles was born in Clifton, Bristol, the daughter of Richard William Giles, a barrister, and Frances Elizabeth Giles. Her older sister was the painter Frances Giles. Margaret was educated at Kensington High School and in Brussels and Heidelberg. She spent eight years at the National Art Training School, NATS, in London. Among her contemporaries at NATS, which became the Royal College of Art in 1896, were a number of other female sculptors including Ruby Levick, Esther Moore, Florence Steele, Lilian Simpson and Lucy Gwendolen Williams. During the 1890s Giles won a number of national art prizes with her model Hero winning the Art Union of London's statuette competition in 1895. Giles was a regular exhibitor at the Royal Academy in London, with the Arts and Crafts Exhibition Society and with the Royal West of England Academy in Bristol, of which she was a member. At the Royal Academy she showed a number of sculptures, reliefs and medals, including one for hospital nurses and another for the Royal Horticultural Society. Between 1884 and 1912 Giles also exhibited works at the Royal Glasgow Institute of the Fine Arts, the Royal Scottish Academy and with the Ridley Art Club. She married engineer Bernard Maxwell Jenkin in 1898.
