= Thrum's Hawaiian Annual =

Statistical compendium of Hawaiiana

Thrum's Hawaiian Annual and Standard Guide 1943 69th edition

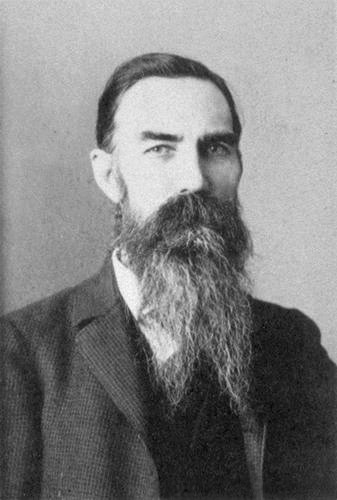
Thomas George Thrum

Thrum's Hawaiian Annual (fully Thrum's Hawaiian Annual and Standard Guide; alternatively All About Hawaii) is a statistical compendium of Hawaiiana ranging from Hawaiian mythology to Hawaiian language to sites of interest in Hawaii. Originally compiled by antiquarian bookman Thomas George Thrum, it was first published in 1875 as The Hawaiian Annual and Almanac. Starting in 1940, the Thrum's Hawaiian Almanac and Annual was published by The Honolulu Star-Bulletin Ltd.

In 1898, Illustrated Handbook of the Hawaiian Islands called Thrum's Annual "a valuable statistical work".

== Collections ==
In 1908 the Hamilton Library acquired the Thrum Hawaiiana collection.

== Notable people ==
- Bessie Wheeler, artist
