= Reginald Fairfax Wells =

Reginald Fairfax Wells (1877 – 29 June 1951) was an English sculptor, potter, aviator, aircraft designer, aircraft manufacturer, and architect.

Reginald Wells was born a British subject in 1877 in Rio de Janeiro, Brazil; at that time his father James William Wells (1847–1902) was a British explorer of the Brazilian Amazon region. After studying sculpture at the South Kensington School of Art and ceramics at Camberwell, Reginald Wells married Clarissa Rawlings in London in 1899 and then the couple moved to the county of Kent, near Wrotham. Wells established the Coldrum Pottery in Kent and in 1909 moved the business to Chelsea, London.

Wells's pottery business was successful, but during WWI he started the Wells Aviation Company alongside his pottery in Chelsea and also started a subsidiary aircraft factory near Chichester. He designed and built the Wells Reo, a single-seat biplane. However, the aviation company went bankrupt in 1917 and was sold to Waring & Gillow. After WWI he moved his pottery business to King's Road, replaced the trademark Coldrum® by Soon®, and changed the name of the company to the London Pottery Company. In 1923 he moved the pottery business to Storrington.

In the 1920s Wells designed replicas of 17th-century thatched cottages. His business venture built, in Kent and Sussex, almost 200 cottages, intended as weekend retreats for artistic people or proto-hippies who wanted to occasionally experience a rustic existence. During WWII Wells returned to making aircraft parts.

Wells is considered one of the first true studio potters working on an entirely independent basis. His interests lay in English slipwares and Chinese stonewares anticipating the concerns of later studio potters, such as Bernard Leach and William Staite Murray.

Wells was a multi-talented man who designed aircraft in the early days of flying and had a flying school at Cobnor near Chichester. He designed a flying-boat and speedboat which were launched at Cobnor.

There were three children from Wells's first marriage. In 1938 in London, Wells married Resca Ospovat, whose orthodox Jewish parents with a number of children immigrated to Manchester from Dvinsk around 1891. The artist Henry Ospovat (1877–1909) was one of her brothers.
