= Lucy Gwendolen Williams =

Welsh artist, sculptor (1870–1955)

Lucy Gwendolen Williams, also known as Gwen Williams (27 December 1870 – 11 February 1955) was a British sculptor and painter and a descendant of the Williams family of Highfield Hall in Flintshire.

== Life ==
Lucy Gwendolen Williams was born in Lower Bebington, Cheshire to the Reverend Henry Lewis Williams, the vicar of Bleasely and his wife Katherine. During the 1890s she studied at the Wimbledon College of Arts under the tutelage of Alfred Drury, later moving to the Royal College of Art where she was taught by Professor Édouard Lantéri. Although she also painted watercolours and reliefs, her main work was in bronze or marble, consisting of statuettes, busts and children's heads. Williams interests included gardening and Theosophy and she was a Fellow of the Brighton and Hove Theosophical Society. She died in Buxton in 1955.

== Career ==
During her career, which spanned over 40 years, Williams was primarily based in London although she spent a period of 8 or 9 years in Rome from 1910 and may also have worked in New York for some time. In 1893, whilst still a student at Wimbledon College, some of her work was exhibited at the Royal Academy and she was to continue exhibiting here until 1935. Her work was also shown at the Royal Scottish Academy, the Paris salon and in Rome and New York. She also had a solo show at the Brook Street Gallery in London in 1935. Williams awards included silver medals at the National Eisteddfod of Wales and the Franco-British exhibition and a bronze Santiago medal. Her private patrons included Queen Alexandra of Denmark, Queen Margherita of Italy while examples of her work in Britain include two bronze statuettes in Leeds and one in Liverpool. A typical piece, entitled 'The Queen of Dreams' is held by the Victoria and Albert Museum in London and reflects the influence of Alfred Drury. The piece is made of the zinc alloy, Spelter, which was often used as a cheaper alternative to bronze. The National Museum of Wales in Cardiff holds three pieces, The Chase, The Stick and Jeanette, whilst further examples are held by the National Library of Wales in Aberystwyth. In 1926 Williams was commissioned to create a bronze bust of Robert Owen which is on display at the museum dedicated to his life in Newtown, Powys.
