= List of public art in Kensington =

This is a list of public art in Kensington, a district in the City of Westminster and the Royal Borough of Kensington and Chelsea in London.

== City of Westminster ==
| Image | Title / subject | Location and coordinates | Date | Artist / designer | Architect / other | Type | Designation | Notes |
|---|---|---|---|---|---|---|---|---|
| More images | Memorial to the Great Exhibition | Kensington Gore 51°30′01″N 0°10′38″W | 1863 | Joseph Durham | Sydney Smirke | Statue with other sculpture | Grade II | Erected in June 1863 in the gardens of the Royal Horticultural Society in South Kensington. Moved to its present site in the early 1890s. Another cast of the statue of Prince Albert is in Saint Peter Port, Guernsey. |
| More images | Shields | Royal Albert Hall | c. 1866 | Godfrey Sykes | Francis Fowke | Reliefs | Grade I | 63 terracotta shields with 27 different charges, installed after Sykes's early death in 1866. |
| | Procession of Musicians and Singers and other decorations | 26 Kensington Gore, originally the National Training School for Music | c. 1874–1875 | F. W. Moody | H. H. Cole | Frieze and sgraffito decorations | Grade II | Moody drew inspiration from the frieze of the Parthenon; his students at the National Art Training School executed the work. |
| | Music | Queen Alexandra's House, Kensington Gore | 1884 | Richard Ledward | Caspar Purdon Clarke | Terracotta relief | Grade II | A representation of a female figure playing a violin and a dancing putto holding a pair of cymbals. |
| | Visual Arts | Queen Alexandra's House, Kensington Gore | 1884 | Richard Ledward | Caspar Purdon Clarke | Terracotta relief | Grade II | Two allegorical figures alluding to painting and architecture, with a sculptor's tools also visible. |
| More images | Statue of Robert Napier, 1st Baron Napier of Magdala | Queen's Gate 51°30′05″N 0°10′49″W | 1891 | Joseph Edgar Boehm | —N/a | Equestrian statue | Grade II | Originally stood in Waterloo Place; moved to its current site in 1921. A replica of the statue to Napier in Kolkata. The boundary line with Kensington and Chelsea bisects the length of this statue. In 2004 the artist Eleonora Aguiari wrapped the statue in bright red tape as a comment on Britain's imperialist past. |
| More images | Lions | Imperial College Road, at the foot of the Queen's Tower 51°29′55″N 0°10′37″W | 1893 | Harry Dixon | T. E. Collcutt (original setting) | Sculptures | —N/a | Two of a set of four lions couchant which originally stood outside the demolished Imperial Institute; the other pair were moved to the Commonwealth Institute and are now in the gardens of Clarence House. |
| | Memorial to the Victims of the Hungarian Uprising of 1956 | Façade of Ognisko Polskie, 55 Princes Gate, Exhibition Road elevation 51°29′57″N 0°10′27″W | 1960 | Ferenc Kovács | | Plaque with relief sculpture | | |
| | Scientific Diagrams and Equations | Blackett Laboratory, Prince Consort Road 51°29′59″N 0°10′45″W | 1960 | John Rattenbury Skeaping | | Architectural sculpture | | |
| | Mosaic | Royal Albert Hall, South Porch 51°30′02″N 0°10′38″W | 2003 | Shelagh Wakely (made by Trevor Caley) | Building Design Partnership (South Porch) | Mosaic | —N/a | Installed on the pediment of the Building Design Partnership's new South Porch of 2003, the 60,000-piece mosaic is inspired by chaos theory and by the existing, Victorian frieze on the Albert Hall's façade. |
| | Balustrade | Royal Geographical Society, Exhibition Road 51°30′04″N 0°10′29″W | 2004 | Eleanor Long | Craig Downie | Glass balustrade | —N/a | Images of contours, maps and landscapes are etched into the glass panels. |
| | Velocity Wave | Imperial College Sports Centre, Prince's Gardens 51°30′00″N 0°10′24″W | 2004–2006 | Pat Kaufman | Arup Associates | Glass balustrade | —N/a | The artist consulted scientists at Imperial College researching into the velocity wave patterns of different sporting activities. These patterns were etched into the glass panes at the entrance ramps and stairs to the sports centre, and infilled with resin and gold leaf. The balustrade is lit at night by white LED lights. |
| More images | Alert | Dangoor Plaza 51.4980°N 0.1770°W | 2022 | Antony Gormley | —N/a | Sculpture | —N/a | A gift to Imperial College London from an alumnus, Brahmal Vasudevan, and his wife Shanthi Kandiah. |
| More images | Statue of Elizabeth II | Royal Albert Hall, South Porch | 2022 | Poppy Field | | Statue in niche | | Unveiled 11 November 2023 by Charles III and Queen Camilla. Elizabeth II is shown as she would have appeared in the mid-1960s, wearing the Vladimir Tiara and Delhi Durbar Necklace. |
| More images | Statue of Prince Philip, Duke of Edinburgh | Royal Albert Hall, South Porch | 2022 | Poppy Field | | Statue in niche | | Unveiled 11 November 2023, a pendant to the statue of Elizabeth II. Prince Philip is shown in white tie, wearing several of his orders and military medals, gazing towards the Queen. |

=== Royal Albert Hall frieze ===
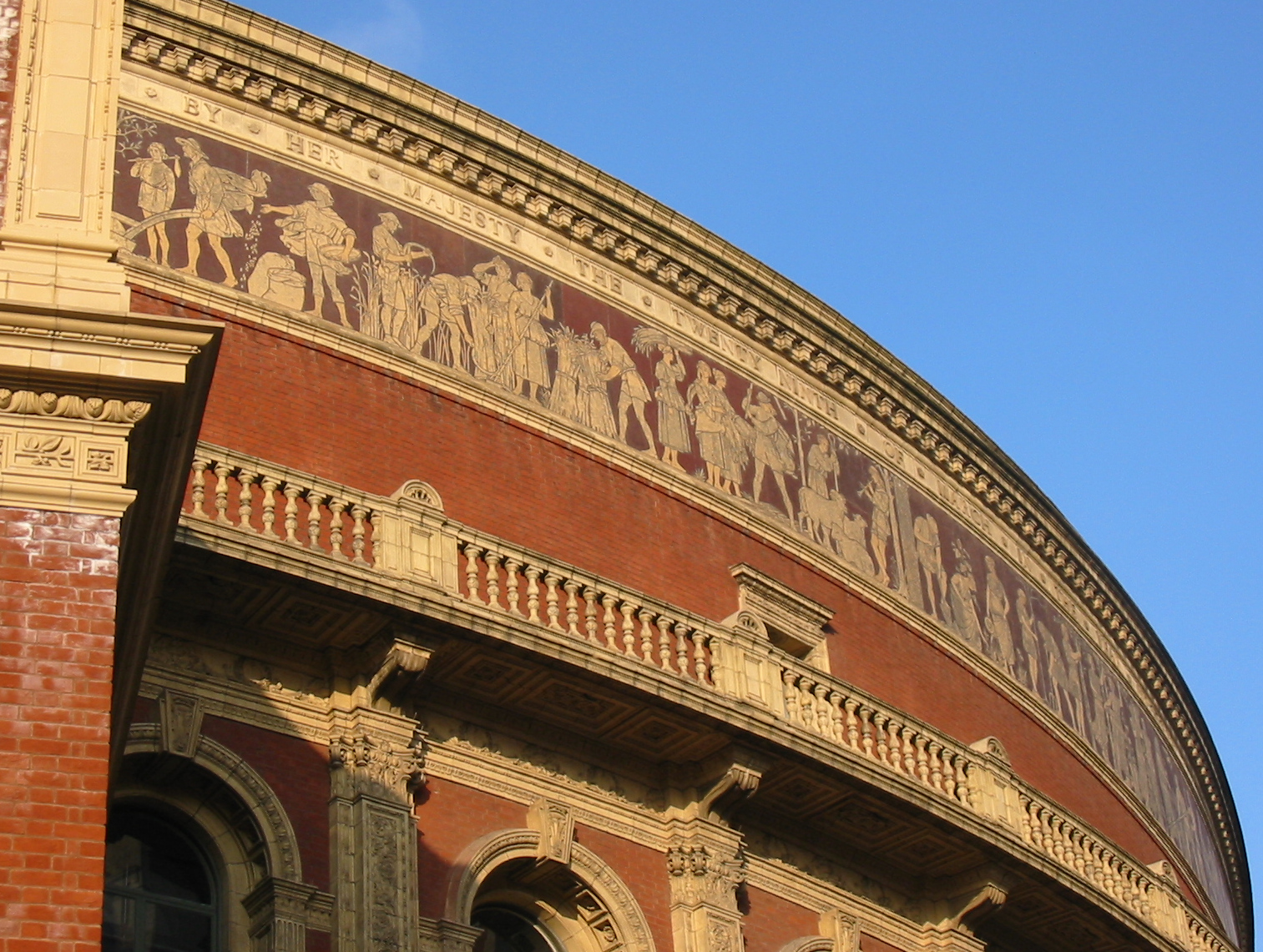
Detail of the frieze

The exterior of the Royal Albert Hall (built in 1867–1871 to the designs of Francis Fowke and Henry Young Darracott Scott) is embellished with a mosaic frieze composed of sixteen separate designs by multiple artists. This was assembled from 800 slabs prepared by attendees of the South Kensington Museum's mosaic class; the terracotta was manufactured by Minton, Hollins and Company. The designs are listed below in anti-clockwise order from the north.

| # | Subject | Artist | Designation |
|---|---|---|---|
| 1 | Various Countries of the World Bringing in Their Offerings to the Exhibition of 1851 | Edward Poynter | Grade I |
| 2 | Music | Frederick Richard Pickersgill | Grade I |
| 3 | Sculpture | Frederick Richard Pickersgill | Grade I |
| 4 | Painting | Frederick Richard Pickersgill | Grade I |
| 5 | Princes, Art Patrons and Artists | Edward Armitage | Grade I |
| 6 | Workers in Stone | William Frederick Yeames | Grade I |
| 7 | Workers in Wood and Brick | William Frederick Yeames | Grade I |
| 8 | Architecture | William Frederick Yeames | Grade I |
| 9 | The Infancy of the Arts and Sciences | Frederick Richard Pickersgill | Grade I |
| 10 | Agriculture | Henry Stacy Marks | Grade I |
| 11 | Horticulture and Land Surveying | Henry Stacy Marks | Grade I |
| 12 | Astronomy and Navigation | Henry Stacy Marks | Grade I |
| 13 | A Group of Philosophers, Sages and Students | Edward Armitage | Grade I |
| 14 | Engineering | John Callcott Horsley | Grade I |
| 15 | The Mechanical Powers | Henry Hugh Armstead | Grade I |
| 16 | Pottery and Glassmaking | Frederick Richard Pickersgill | Grade I |

=== Royal Geographical Society ===
| Image | Title / subject | Location and coordinates | Date | Artist / designer | Architect / other | Type | Designation | Notes |
|---|---|---|---|---|---|---|---|---|
| | Bust of Clements Markham | Courtyard | 1921 | F. W. Pomeroy | | Bust | Grade II* | |
| More images | Statue of Ernest Shackleton | Exhibition Road façade 51.5015°N 0.17479°W | 1927–1932 | Charles Sargeant Jagger | | Statue in niche | Grade II* | |
| More images | Statue of David Livingstone | Kensington Gore façade 51.50161°N 0.17498°W | 1953 | T. B. Huxley-Jones | | Statue in niche | Grade II* | |

== Royal Borough of Kensington and Chelsea ==
| Image | Title / subject | Location and coordinates | Date | Artist / designer | Architect / other | Type | Designation | Notes |
|---|---|---|---|---|---|---|---|---|
| More images | Queen Victoria Monument | Warwick Gardens 51°29′49″N 0°12′15″W | 1904 | —N/a | Henry Louis Florence | Commemorative column | Grade II | |
| More images | Kensington War Memorial | Kensington Church Street, southern end 51°30′08″N 0°11′28″W | 1922 | F. W. Pomeroy | Major Hubert C. Corlette | War memorial | Grade II | Unveiled 1 July 1922 by Princess Louise, Duchess of Argyll. |
| | Genius | Kensington Central Library 51°30′05″N 0°11′40″W | 1958 | William McMillan | E. Vincent Harris | Architectural sculpture | Grade II* | |
| | Bust of Geoffrey Chaucer | Kensington Central Library | 1958 | William McMillan | E. Vincent Harris | Architectural sculpture | Grade II* | |
| | Bust of William Caxton | Kensington Central Library | 1958 | William McMillan | E. Vincent Harris | Architectural sculpture | Grade II* | |
| | Statue of a lion with the Royal coat of arms | Outside Kensington Central Library, facing Phillimore Walk 51°30′05″N 0°11′40″W | 1958 | William McMillan | E. Vincent Harris | Architectural sculpture | Grade II* | |
| | Statue of a unicorn with the Royal coat of arms | Outside Kensington Central Library, facing Phillimore Walk 51°30′05″N 0°11′39″W | 1958 | William McMillan | E. Vincent Harris | Architectural sculpture | Grade II* | |
| More images | Head of Invention (or Newton after James Watt) | Outside the Design Museum 51°29′58″N 0°11′58″W | 1989 | Eduardo Paolozzi | —N/a | Sculpture | —N/a | Commissioned by Terence Conran to stand outside the museum's previous site at Shad Thames; relocated here in 2016. |
| | Head of the Stairs | Hornton Street 51°30′06″N 0°11′42″W | 2000 | Ivor Abrahams | —N/a | Sculpture | —N/a | |
| | Statue of Maud of Wales, Queen of Norway | 10 Palace Green | 2005 | Ada Madssen | —N/a | Statue | —N/a | Unveiled 27 October 2005 by Harald V. |
| More images | Glorious Beauty | In front of Benson House, 375 Kensington High Street, on the corner with Warwick Road 51.4965°N 0.2057°W | 2014 | Simon Hitchens | —N/a | Sculpture | —N/a | A garnet amphibolite boulder from Anglesey, supporting a mirror image of itself in stainless steel. |
| | Arbour | 21 Young Street | 2018 | Shaun Leane; Chris Brammall (metalwork) | Assael Architects | Architectural sculpture | —N/a | Bronze foliage spreading across the building's façades and balconies; a section has been acquired for the V&A's ironwork collection. |
| | Here and There | Junction of Canning Passage and Victoria Road | 2023 | Nick Hornby | —N/a | Multi-perspective sculpture | —N/a | Combines the silhouette of Friedrich's Wanderer Above the Sea of Fog with a squiggle from a page of Sterne's Tristram Shandy. Commissioned as part of the One Kensington Gardens development. |

=== Earl's Court ===
| Image | Title / subject | Location and coordinates | Date | Artist / designer | Architect / other | Type | Designation | Notes |
|---|---|---|---|---|---|---|---|---|
| | Saint Gregory | St Cuthbert's Church, Philbeach Gardens | 1908 | Gilbert Dutson Boulton | Hugh Roumieu Gough (1884–1885) | Statue in niche | Grade I | The only executed figure out of ten which Gough intended to fill the niches on the east front. |
| More images | War memorial | St Cuthbert's Church, Philbeach Gardens | 1919 | Guglielmo Tosi | J. Harold Gibbons (designer) | Calvary | —N/a | |
| More images | Do It All | Royal Warwick Square | 2023 | Nick Hornby | —N/a | Multi-perspective sculpture | —N/a | Combines the profile of Nefertiti with the silhouette of the Albert Memorial. The brief called for a commemoration of two residents of the area: George Gilbert Scott and Howard Carter. A Postmodernist, Neo-Egyptian branch of Homebase formerly stood on the site, where Hornby shopped for supplies growing up. |

=== Holland Park ===
| Image | Title / subject | Location and coordinates | Date | Artist / designer | Architect / other | Type | Designation | Notes |
|---|---|---|---|---|---|---|---|---|
| More images | The Ancient Melancholy Man | Holland Park | 16th century | ? | —N/a | Statue | —N/a | |
| More images | Milo of Croton Trying His Strength | Holland Park | 19th century | After Edme Dumont | —N/a | Sculpture | —N/a | Donated by the Friends of Holland Park in 2003. |
| More images | Statue of Henry Vassall-Fox, 3rd Baron Holland | Holland Park 51°30′15″N 0°12′12″W | 1872 | George Frederic Watts and Joseph Edgar Boehm | —N/a | Statue | Grade II | Unveiled 1926. |
| More images | Boy with Bear Cubs | Holland Park | 1902 | John Macallan Swan | —N/a | Statue on pedestal | —N/a | |
| More images | Sun Worshipper | The Café | 1910 | Jacob Epstein | —N/a | Limestone relief panel | —N/a | |
| More images | Sibirica | Iris Garden | 1999 | William Pye | —N/a | Sculptural fountain | —N/a | The title is a reference to Iris sibirica (the Siberian iris). |
| More images | Annunciation | Holland Park | 2000 | Andrew Burton | —N/a | Sculpture | —N/a | |
| | Caesura VI | Holland Park | 2000 | Charles Hadcock | —N/a | Sculpture | —N/a | |
| More images | Tortoises with Triangle and Time | Holland Park | 2000 | Wendy Taylor | —N/a | Sundial with sculpture in bronze | —N/a | |
| More images | Tonda | Holland Park | 2014 | Jonathan Loxley | —N/a | Abstract sculpture in honey onyx | —N/a | |
| More images | Walking Man | Holland Park | 2014 | Sean Henry | —N/a | Statue | —N/a | |

=== North Kensington and Notting Hill ===
| Image | Title / subject | Location and coordinates | Date | Artist / designer | Architect / other | Type | Designation | Notes |
|---|---|---|---|---|---|---|---|---|
| | Escutcheon with the Clément-Talbot trade mark | Ladbroke Hall (formerly the Clément-Talbot Motor Works), Barlby Road | 1903 | ? | William T. Walker | Relief | Grade II | |
| | Coat of arms of the National Bank Limited (Azure a harp Or within an orle of bezants) | Pembridge Gardens, on side of Royal Bank of Scotland, Notting Hill Gate 51.5092°N 0.1965°W | 1950s | ? | | Architectural sculpture (relief) | | The National Bank was based in Ireland, and had a branch here. Its British operations were eventually acquired by the Royal Bank of Scotland in 1985. |
| | Mosaic of Saint Sava | Façade of St Sava's Serbian Orthodox Church, Notting Hill 51.5169°N 0.2088°W | c. 1952 | | | Mosaic | —N/a | |
| More images | Statue of Saint Volodymyr | Holland Park Avenue 51.5074°N 0.2041°W | 1988 | Leo Mol | —N/a | Statue | —N/a | Unveiled 29 May 1988. Commemorates the 1,000th anniversary of the Christianisation of Kievan Rus'. Later in 1988, another statue of the saint by the same sculptor was erected in Rome. |
| | Haiku Sculpture | Outside the Czech Embassy, at the junction of Notting Hill Gate and Palace Gardens Terrace | 1996 | Václav Vokolek | —N/a | Sculpture | —N/a | Six stainless steel rectangles arranged to resemble three open books, with letters cut out to varying degrees spelling out a haiku by Vokolek. |
| | Carnival Elephant | Outside Waterstone's, Notting Hill Gate 51.5090°N 0.1957°W | 2003 | Nadim Karam | | Sculpture | —N/a | |
| | Two Carnival Figures | On roof of Waterstone's, Notting Hill Gate 51.5090°N 0.1956°W | 2003 | Nadim Karam | | Architectural sculpture | —N/a | |
| | Sculptural reliefs and Triton weather-vane | Havona House, 57 Pembridge Villas, Pembridge Road | c. 2011–2017 | Theo Gayer-Anderson | Mallinson Architects & Engineers | Architectural sculpture | —N/a | The reliefs are based on those of the Tower of the Winds as they appeared in Stuart and Revettt's Antiquities of Athens (1762). |
| | Jumbie Jubilation | Ruby Zoe Hotel, Notting Hill Gate | 2024 | Zak Ové and Oliver Budd | Squire and Partners | Glass mosaics | —N/a | |

=== South Kensington ===
| Image | Title / subject | Location and coordinates | Date | Artist / designer | Architect / other | Type | Designation | Notes |
|---|---|---|---|---|---|---|---|---|
| | Architectural sculpture | 39 Harrington Gardens | 1882–1883 | ? | Ernest George and Peto | Architectural sculpture | Grade II | The house was built for the librettist W. S. Gilbert; the sculpted ship and dolphins on the gable allude to his supposed ancestor Sir Humphrey Gilbert. |
| More images | Statue of Robert Napier, 1st Baron Napier of Magdala | Queen's Gate 51.5013°N 0.1803°W | 1891 | Joseph Edgar Boehm | —N/a | Equestrian statue | Grade II | Originally stood in Waterloo Place; moved to its current site in 1921. A replica of the statue to Napier in Kolkata. The boundary line with the City of Westminster bisects the length of this statue. In 2004 the artist Eleonora Aguiari wrapped the statue in bright red tape as a comment on Britain's imperialist past. |
| | Bust of Julius Wernher | Royal School of Mines 51.4999°N 0.1757°W | 1910 | Paul Raphael Montford | Aston Webb | Bust | Grade II | |
| | Bust of Alfred Beit | Royal School of Mines 51.4999°N 0.1758°W | 1910 | Paul Raphael Montford | Aston Webb | Bust | Grade II | |
| | War memorial | Outside St Augustine's Church, Queen's Gate 1.4932°N 0.1783°W | After 1918 | ? | | Calvary | | |
| More images | Yalta Memorial (Twelve Responses to Tragedy) | Yalta Memorial Garden, Cromwell Road 51.4957°N 0.1724°W | 1986 | Angela Conner | | | —N/a | Replaced original version of 1981, destroyed by vandals in 1982. |
| | Unfurl | Palace Gate, at the corner with Kensington Gate 51.4998°N 0.1836°W | 2000 | Eilis O'Connell | —N/a | Sculpture | —N/a | A sheet of bronze curved into a shape resembling an arum lily, commissioned to mark the turn of the millennium. |
| More images | Statue of Béla Bartók | South Kensington tube station 51.4937°N 0.17381°W | 2004 | Imre Varga | —N/a | Statue | —N/a | The statue, a copy of one in Budapest, faces the house on Sydney Place where the composer stayed on several visits to London. |
| More images | Memorial to victims of the 2004 Indian Ocean Tsunami | Darwin Centre courtyard, Natural History Museum 51.4963°N 0.1784°W | 2011 | —N/a | Carmody Groarke Architects | Memorial | —N/a | Unveiled 6 July 2011 by the Prince of Wales and the Duchess of Cornwall. 4.1m³ of granite with one corner cut away, the largest single block of stone to be transported in Great Britain since the building of Stonehenge. Michael Holland, the memorial's principal organiser, lost his mother, wife and daughter to the tsunami. |
| More images | Statue of Alfred Russel Wallace | Natural History Museum. Originally outside the Darwin Centre 2 building, near the wildlife garden, later moved indoors | 2013 | Anthony Smith | —N/a | Statue | —N/a | Unveiled 7 November 2013, the centenary of Wallace’s death, by David Attenborough. The statue depicts Wallace at the moment of his discovery of the golden birdwing butterfly in the Bacan Islands of Indonesia. |
| | Fern Diplodocus | Evolution Garden, Natural History Museum | 2024 | —N/a | Factum Arte and Structure Workshop | Sculpture | —N/a | Unveiled 16 July 2024. A bronze cast of the famous specimen Dippy; the name was chosen by local schoolchildren. |
| | Hypsilophodon | Evolution Garden, Natural History Museum | 2024 | —N/a | | Sculpture | —N/a | |

==== Victoria and Albert Museum ====
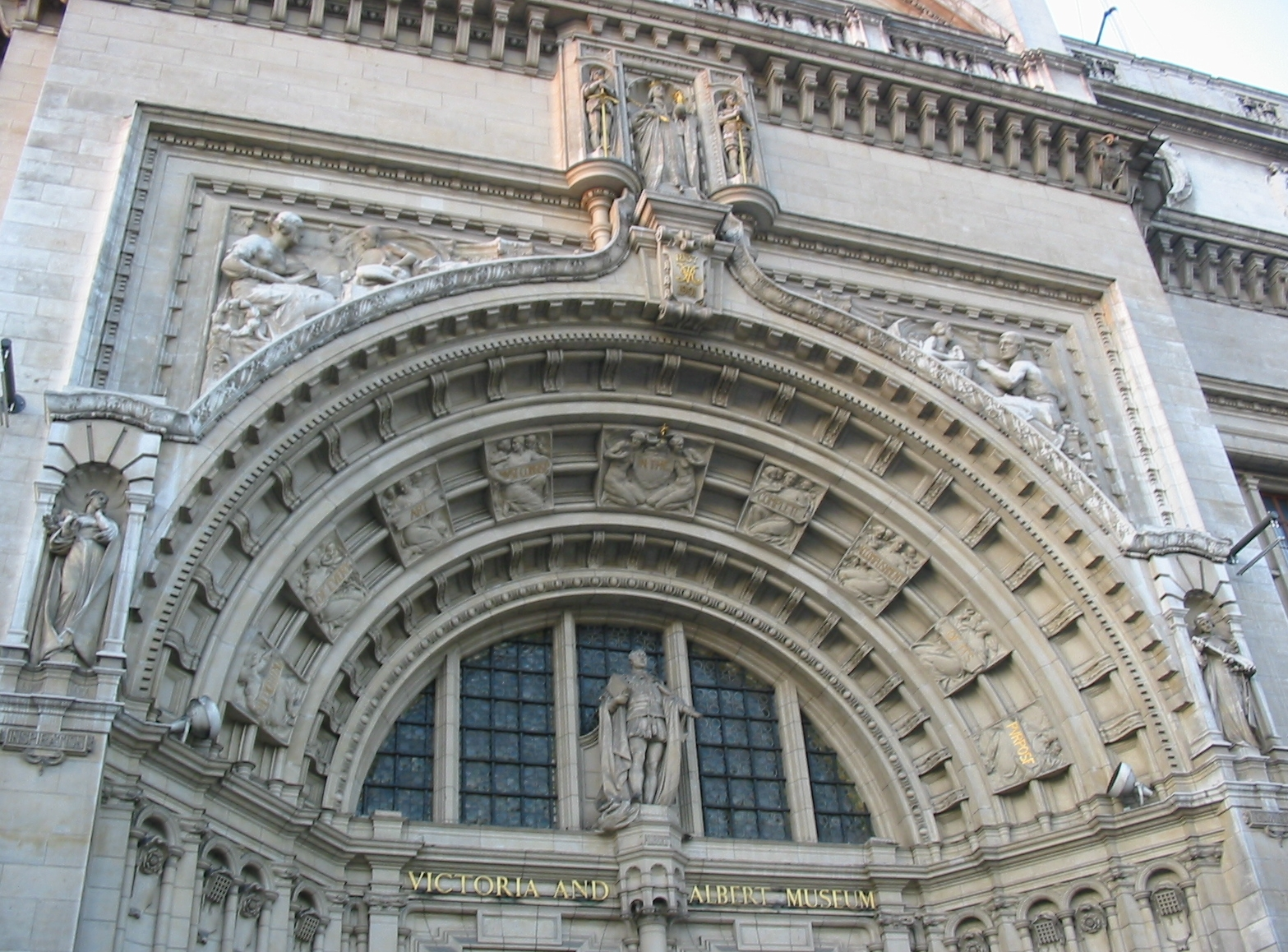
Sculpture above the main entrance to the museum; the architect was Aston Webb.

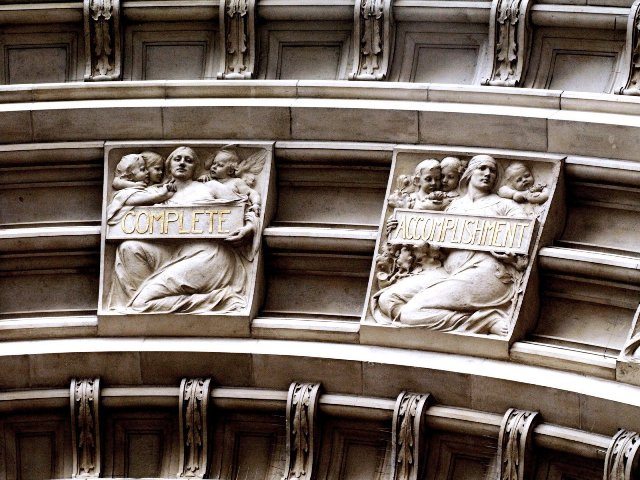
Detail of two of Alfred Drury's relief panels above the main portal. The full inscription is taken from Joshua Reynolds's Discourses: "The excellence of every art must consist in the complete accomplishment of its purpose".

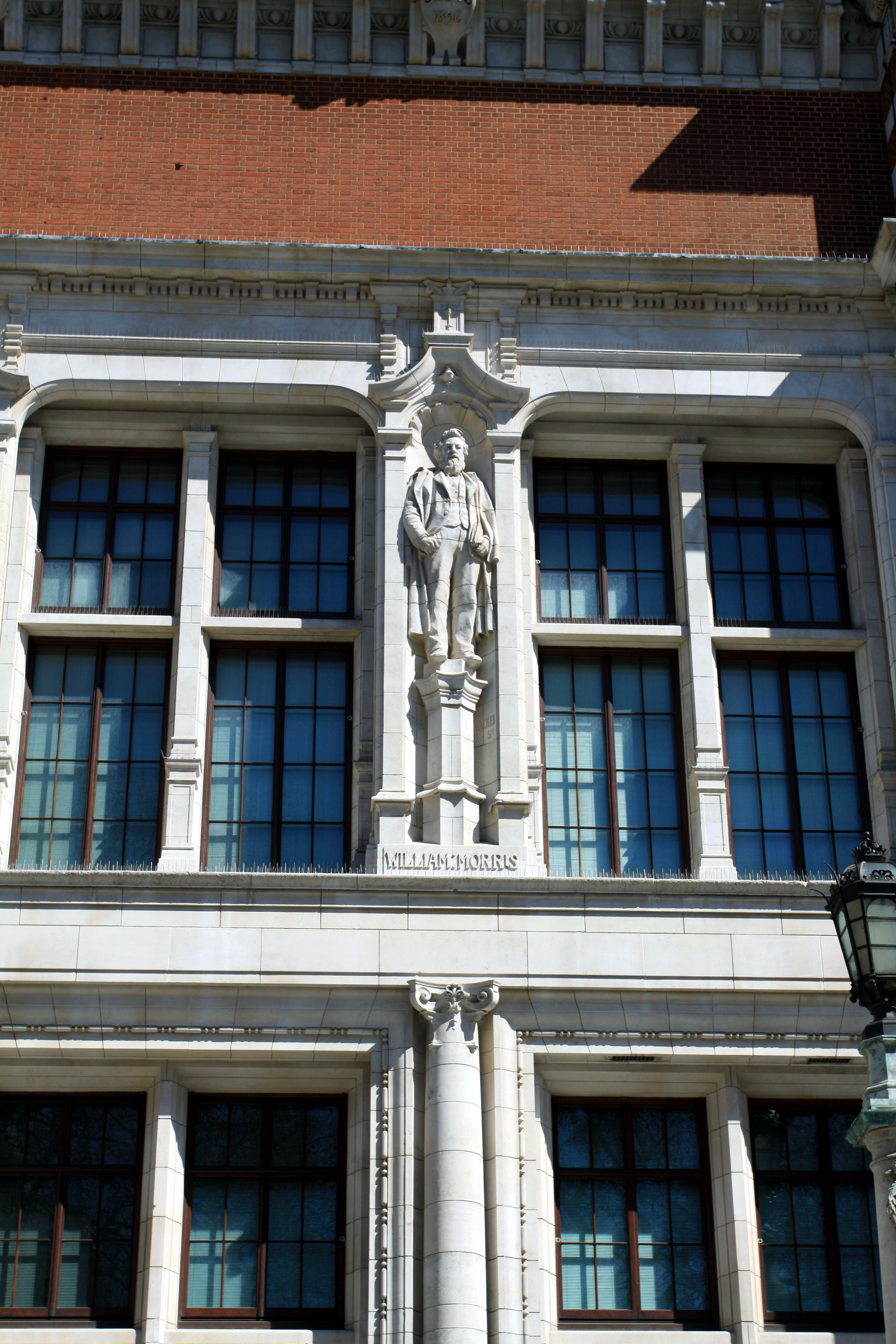
Statue of William Morris by Arthur George Walker on the Exhibition Road façade

| Subject | Notes | Type | Location | Date | Sculptor | Source |
|---|---|---|---|---|---|---|
| Queen Victoria | — | Statue in niche | Cromwell Road façade | 1905 | Alfred Drury | |
| Prince Albert | — | Statue | Cromwell Road façade | 1905 | Alfred Drury | |
| Saint George | — | Statue in niche | Cromwell Road façade | 1905 | Alfred Drury | |
| Saint Michael | — | Statue in niche | Cromwell Road façade | 1905 | Alfred Drury | |
| 9 allegorical figures | — | Relief panels | Cromwell Road façade | 1905 | Alfred Drury | |
| Inspiration and Knowledge | — | Statues in niches | Cromwell Road façade | 1905 | Alfred Drury | |
| Truth and Beauty | — | Reliefs in spandrels | Cromwell Road façade | 1905 | George Frampton | |
| Edward VII | — | Statue in niche | Cromwell Road façade | 1905 | William Goscombe John | |
| Alexandra of Denmark | — | Statue in niche | Cromwell Road façade | 1905 | William Goscombe John | |
| Grinling Gibbons | Sculptor | Statue in niche | Cromwell Road façade | 1905 | William Silver Frith | |
| John Bacon | Sculptor | Statue in niche | Cromwell Road façade | 1905 | William Silver Frith | |
| John Flaxman | Sculptor | Statue in niche | Cromwell Road façade | 1905 | Bertram Pegram | |
| Francis Leggatt Chantrey | Sculptor | Statue in niche | Cromwell Road façade | 1905 | Bertram Pegram | |
| John Henry Foley | Sculptor | Statue in niche | Cromwell Road façade | 1905 | James Gamble | |
| Alfred Stevens | Sculptor | Statue in niche | Cromwell Road façade | 1905 | James Gamble | |
| William Hogarth | Painter | Statue in niche | Cromwell Road façade | 1905 | Reuben Sheppard | |
| Joshua Reynolds | Painter | Statue in niche | Cromwell Road façade | 1905 | Reuben Sheppard | |
| Thomas Gainsborough | Painter | Statue in niche | Cromwell Road façade | 1905 | Stanley Nicholson Babb | |
| George Romney | Painter | Statue in niche | Cromwell Road façade | 1905 | Stanley Nicholson Babb | |
| Richard Cosway | Painter | Statue in niche | Cromwell Road façade | 1905 | Ernest Gillick | |
| J. M. W. Turner | Painter | Statue in niche | Cromwell Road façade | 1905 | Ernest Gillick | |
| John Constable | Painter | Statue in niche | Cromwell Road façade | 1905 | Vincent Hill | |
| George Frederic Watts | Painter | Statue in niche | Cromwell Road façade | 1905 | Richard Reginald Goulden | |
| Frederic, Lord Leighton | Painter | Statue in niche | Cromwell Road façade | 1905 | Gilbert Bayes | |
| John Everett Millais | Painter | Statue in niche | Cromwell Road façade | 1905 | James Stevenson ("Myrander") | |
| William of Wykeham | Architect | Statue in niche | Cromwell Road façade | 1905 | John Wenlock Rollins | |
| John Thorpe | Architect | Statue in niche | Cromwell Road façade | 1905 | John Wenlock Rollins | |
| Inigo Jones | Architect | Statue in niche | Cromwell Road façade | 1905 | Oliver Wheatley | |
| Christopher Wren | Architect | Statue in niche | Cromwell Road façade | 1905 | Oliver Wheatley | |
| William Chambers | Architect | Statue in niche | Cromwell Road façade | 1905 | Gilbert Bayes | |
| Charles Barry | Architect | Statue in niche | Cromwell Road façade | 1905 | Gilbert Bayes | |
| Saint Dunstan | Craftsman | Statue in niche | Exhibition Road façade | 1905 | Frank Lynn Jenkins | |
| William Torell | Metalworker | Statue in niche | Exhibition Road façade | 1905 | Frank Lynn Jenkins | |
| William Caxton | Printer | Statue in niche | Exhibition Road façade | 1905 | Paul Raphael Montford | |
| George Heriot | Goldsmith | Statue in niche | Exhibition Road façade | 1905 | Paul Raphael Montford | |
| Huntingdon Shaw | Smith | Statue in niche | Exhibition Road façade | 1905 | Abraham Broadbent | |
| Thomas Tompion | Clockmaker | Statue in niche | Exhibition Road façade | 1905 | Abraham Broadbent | |
| Thomas Chippendale | Furniture maker | Statue in niche | Exhibition Road façade | 1905 | Albert Hodge | |
| Josiah Wedgwood | Potter | Statue in niche | Exhibition Road façade | 1905 | Albert Hodge | |
| Roger Payne | Bookbinder | Statue in niche | Exhibition Road façade | 1905 | Arthur George Walker | |
| William Morris | Textile designer | Statue in niche | Exhibition Road façade | 1905 | Arthur George Walker | |

== See also ==
- List of public art in Kensington Gardens

== Bibliography ==
- Blackwood, John (1989). London's Immortals: The Complete Outdoor Commemorative Statues. London and Oxford: Savoy Press. ISBN 978-0951429600.
- Cavanagh, Terry (2023). Public Sculpture of Kensington and Chelsea with Westminster South-West. Public Sculpture of Britain. Vol. 22. Watford: Public Statues and Sculpture Association. ISBN 978-1-8383976-2-3.
- Matthews, Peter (2018). London's Statues and Monuments. Oxford: Shire Publications. ISBN 978-1-78442-256-1.
- Westminster City Council (20 April 2009). Conservation Area Audit & Management Proposals: Knightsbridge, Knightsbridge Green, Albert Gate (PDF).
