= Wokalek =

Wokalek is a surname. Notable people with the surname include:

- Karl Wokalek (born 1949), German diplomat
- Johanna Wokalek (born 1975), German actress

== See also ==
- Václav Vokolek (born 1947), Czech writer and painter
