= Judith Bluck =

British sculptor

Judith Bluck FRBS
- Born: 1936; London, England
- Died: 2011 (aged 74–75)
- Monuments: Jimmy Dyer, Carlisle; Boy on a Capstain, Whitehaven
- Occupation: Sculptor

Judith Bluck FRBS (1936–2011) was a British sculptor known for her large scale public works in a variety of materials but most notably in bronze and brick.

== Biography ==
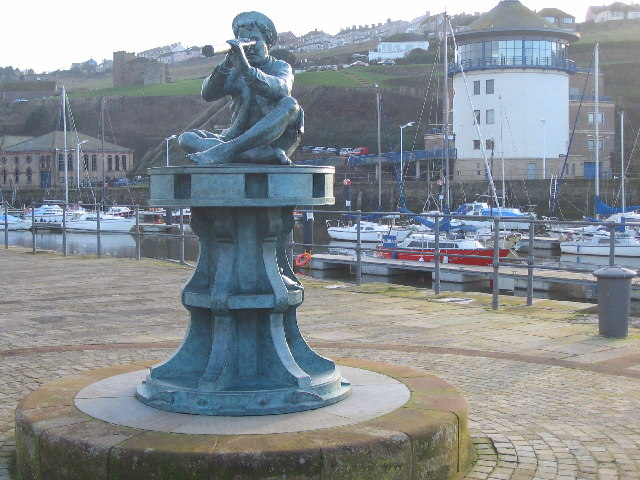
Boy on a Capstain, Whitehaven

Bluck was born in London and originally focused on photography, painting and engraving but eventually came to concentrate on large sculptural commissions, often working with pressed bricks. Bluck was elected a fellow of the Royal Society of British Sculptors in 1978, was a member of the Society of Portrait Sculptors and of the Art Workers Guild. Her 24 metre long brick relief, The Legend of the Iron Gates for the Sainsbury's supermarket in Wilmslow was awarded the Otto Beit Medal by the Royal Society of British Sculptors in 1989. Bluck won both bronze and silver medals from the Societe des Artistes Francais in Paris. As well as Britain and France, Bluck's work has also been exhibited in the United States and in New Zealand.

== Selected public works ==
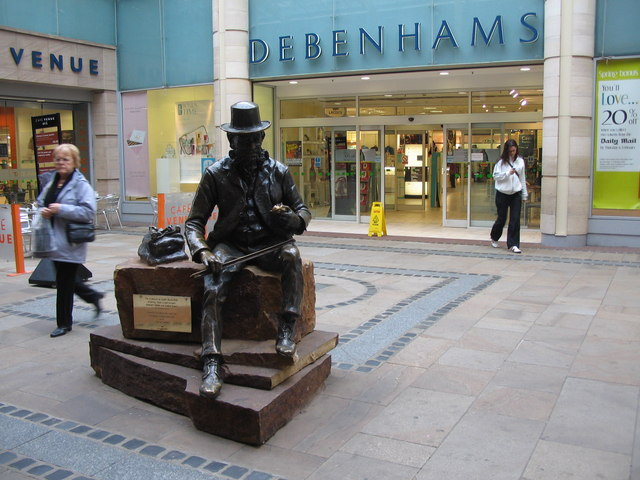
Jimmy Dyer, Carlisle

- Six relief panels in bronze and resin on the life of St Francis of Assisi, 1974, Bristol. The works were destroyed in September 2008 when the office site where they were situated was re-developed.
- Crucible Fountain, 1979, Sheffield.
- Small Workhorse, 1985, Ealing Broadway.
- Legend of the Iron Gates, 1989, Wilmslow.
- Sheep, Milton Keynes.
- Otter Group fountain, The Lanes, Carlise.
- Security Doors, Crown Court, Portsmouth. Bluck also created five insignia designs for Crown Court and prisons.
- Natural Force II, entrance hall of Yorkshire Building Society, Bradford.
- Jimmy Dyer, Carlise.
- Boy on a Capstain, Whitehaven.
- The Sheep, Rochdale.
