= Stanley Nicholson Babb =

Stanley Nicholson Babb, FRBS (1874–1957), also known as S. Nicholson Babb and Nicholson Babb, was a British sculptor.

Among his most important works are the memorial to Robert Falcon Scott and his companions in St Paul's Cathedral, London, the Great War Memorial in Grahamstown, South Africa, and the statues of Thomas Gainsborough and George Romney on the façade of the Victoria and Albert Museum.
