= Christine Gregory =

British artist

- Born: 1879; St Pancras, London
- Died: 10 February 1963 (aged 83–84); Hampstead, London
- Known for: Sculpture, pottery

Christine Gregory (1879–10 February 1963) was a British sculptor and potter. She was among the first women elected as a member of the Royal Society of British Sculptors.

== Biography ==
Gregory was born and lived in London. Her father was a mineralogist from London, while her mother was from Berkshire, and together they raised a family of seven. Gregory taught model making at the Hammersmith School of Art from 1918 to 1937 while working as a sculptor and potter. Working in bronze, terracotta and plaster, she created busts, statuettes, plaques and earthenware pieces. In 1922, she was among the first women elected as a member of the Royal Society of British Sculptors and became a Fellow of that society in 1948. Gregory won several awards and medals, including the Feodora Gleichen Award in 1945 for her coloured plaster sculpture A Child of Africa.

Between 1900 and 1949, Gregory exhibited approximately 37 works at the Royal Academy in London and 24 works with the Society of Women Artists. She also exhibited at the Paris Salon, the Walker Art Gallery in Liverpool, with the Royal Society of Miniature Painters, Sculptors and Gravers, and in Scotland at the Royal Scottish Academy and the Royal Glasgow Institute of the Fine Arts as well as in Canada.

Examples of her work are held by the Ulster Museum in Belfast and the Potteries Museum & Art Gallery in Stoke-on-Trent.
