= St Mary's Parish Church, Hampton =

- St Mary the Virgin, Hampton Upon Thames
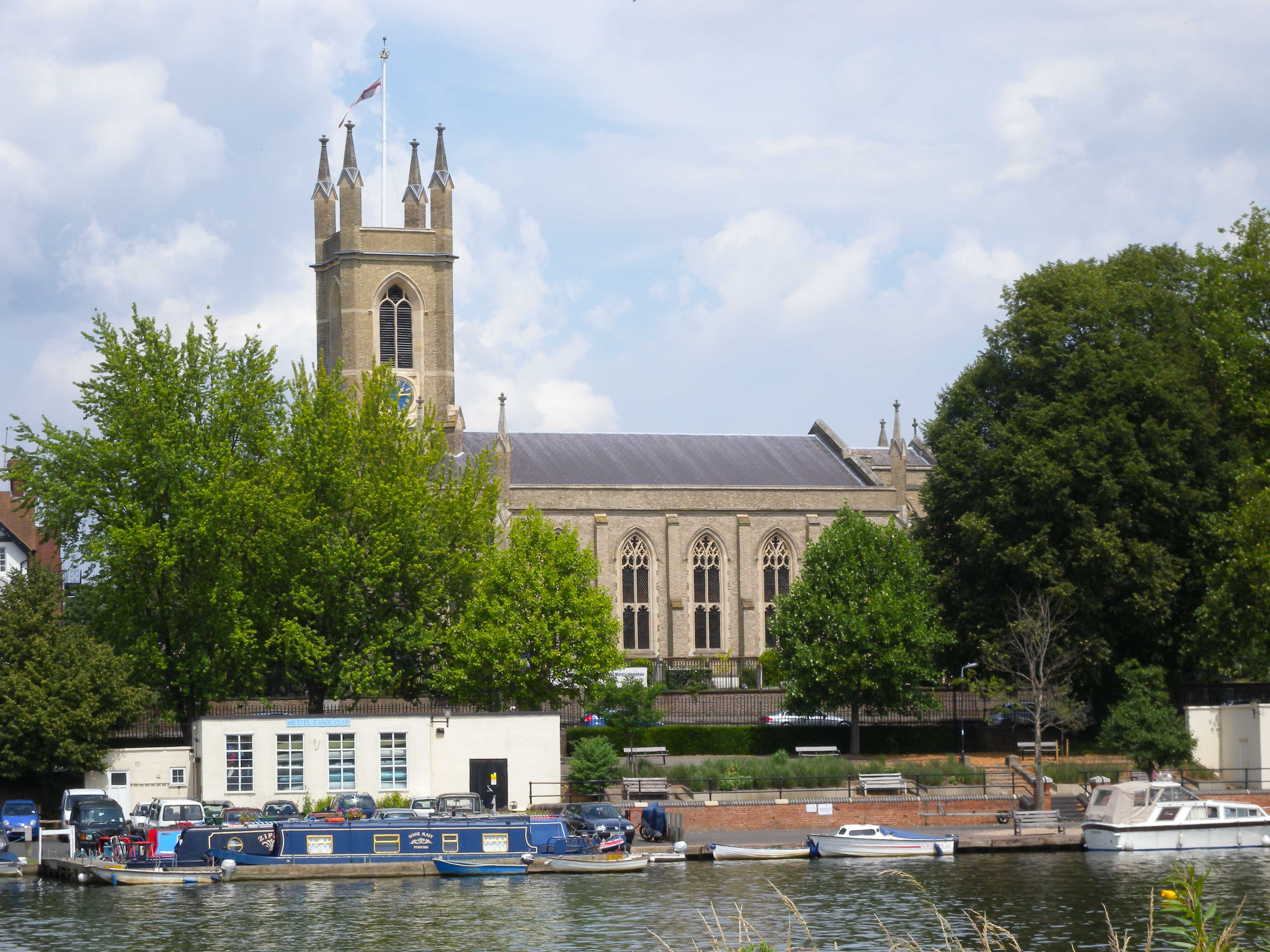
- A view of St Mary's, from the River Thames (2009)
- St Mary's Parish Church, Hampton
- 51.413019°N 0.361261°W
- Location: Thames Street, Hampton, London TW12 2EB
- Country: England
- Denomination: Church of England
- Website: www.hampton-church.org.uk

History
- Status: Parish church
- Founded: 1342
- Dedication: St Mary the Virgin
- Consecrated: 1 September 1831

Architecture
- Functional status: Active
- Architect: Edward Lapidge
- Style: Gothic
- Groundbreaking: April 1830
- Completed: September 1831
- Construction cost: £9,484 1s 2d

Administration
- Province: Canterbury
- Diocese: Diocese of London
- Archdeaconry: Middlesex
- Deanery: Hampton
- Parish: St Mary, Hampton

Clergy
- Archbishop: The Rt Revd & Rt Hon Sarah Mullally
- Bishop: The Rt Revd Emma Ineson

Listed Building – Grade II
- Designated: 2 September 1952
- Reference no.: 1252976

St Mary's Parish Church, Hampton, is an Anglican church in Hampton in the London Borough of Richmond upon Thames.

== Location ==
St Mary's Parish Church is at the junction of two major roads, A308 and A311, leading to Twickenham, Kingston upon Thames and Sunbury-on-Thames. Standing tall on Bell Hill, it marks the ancient heart of Hampton.

During the mid-19th century, houses were built to the north of the existing village; this area became known as New Hampton, and later as Hampton Hill. The parish of St James, Hampton Hill was created in 1863. In 1929 the Hampton parish was further divided by the creation of a separate parish of All Saints.

== History ==
The site upon which this church is built is said to be that of a Romano-British chapel. Certainly a house of worship has stood here for at least 650 years, as historical records begin in 1342, when the site came into possession of the Priory of Takeley in Essex. It is described in the annals of the Priory as a Rectory of that monastery.

Before that time it is possible that a simple wooden structure existed, or services may have been held under the ancient yew tree that stood in the churchyard until 1829.

=== The old church ===
The first church for which there are historical records was built of flint and stone. The interior of the building had galleries round the north, west and south sides, with a singing loft for choir and instrumental accompaniment. There was a three-decker pulpit: the first level for the clerk, the second for the reading of lessons, and the uppermost for the delivery of sermons. The royal pew was situated at the front of the north gallery. The old church also housed a school room and provided a master for Hampton School, from 1557.

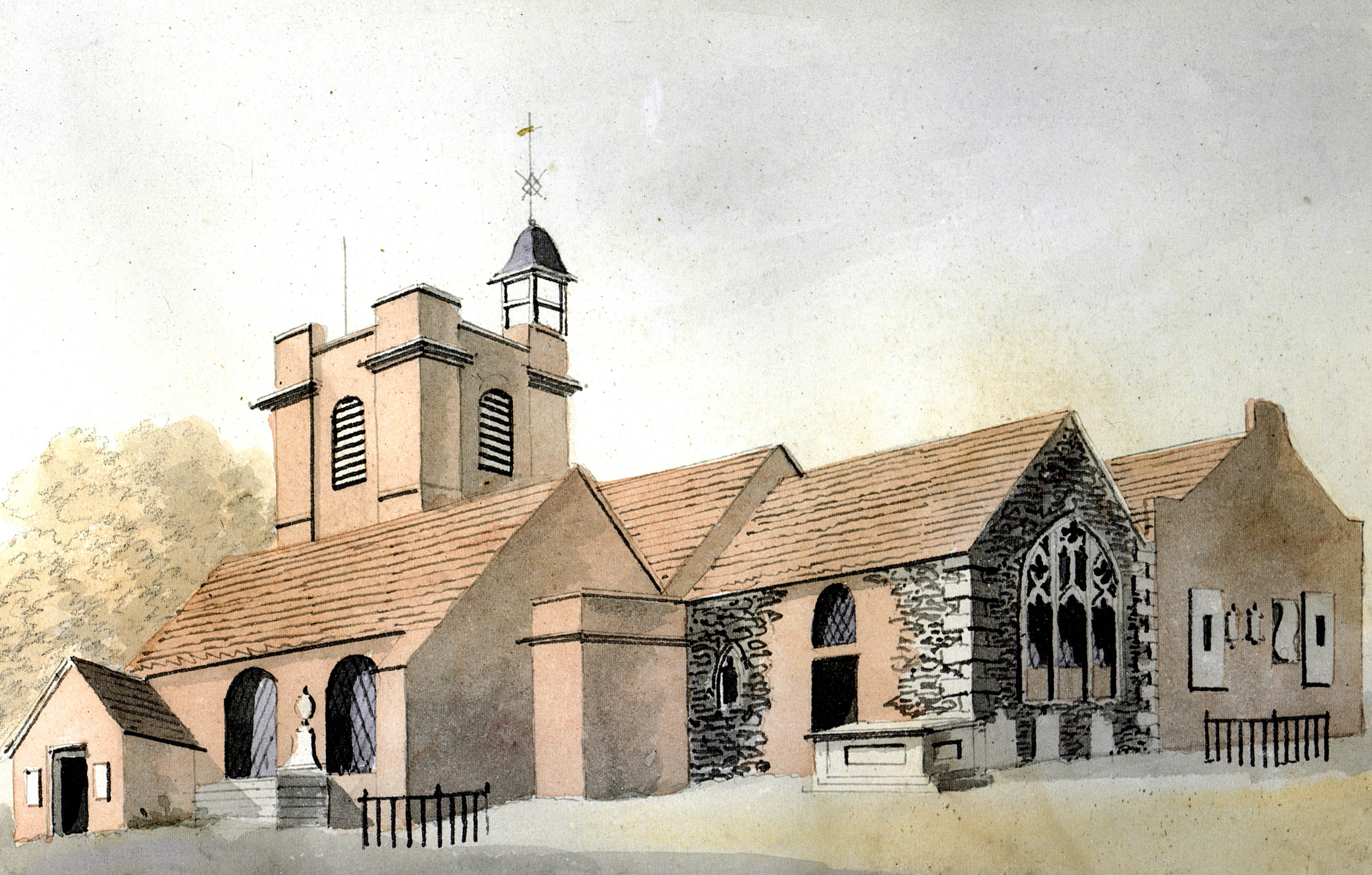
The original church, demolished in 1830

At the time of Henry VIII a new nave, south aisle and porch were rebuilt with brick (“having got out of repair and become unsafe”) – the original flint and stone chancel and tower were retained.

In 1671 the tower also became unsafe and a new brick tower was erected. Charles II contributed £350.

In 1726, the north aisle and the vault beneath it were added to the church, as was the vestry room at the north-west corner of the church; George I gave £500 towards the extension. This version of the building was described as Hampton's "brick church in pre-eminence, with fresh-painted and accommodating covered benches in the churchyard". The church was well-attended (one service on Sunday morning, and one in the evening); twelve or more carriages waited outside the church. A notable worshipper was George FitzClarence, 1st Earl of Munster.

Memorials from the old church were preserved and erected in the new church, including those to Susannah Thomas (d.1731), Sibel Penn (d.1562), who was nurse to Edward VI, Edmond Pigeon and his son Nickolas, who served as Yeoman of the Jewel House, and Huntington Shaw (d.1710), who ‘designed and executed the ornamental Iron work at Hampton Court Palace.’

=== The present building ===
As the population grew the Vestry decided that the old building needed to be enlarged. There was an initial plan simply to extend in 1821. The Crown promised a contribution if seats were to be provided for those who lived at Hampton Court Palace. However insufficient money was raised from other sources and the project was deferred.

In fact for the next eight years there were various schemes and competitions to design a new building. Eventually the old building closed on 27 December 1829, and the congregation moved to the Great Hall of Hampton Court Palace as the church was demolished.

Prince William, Duke of Clarence laid the new foundation stone on 18 April 1830 and the new building was consecrated on 1 September 1831. The occasion was deemed so significant that Princess Adelaide, Prince George and his sister Princess Augusta were in attendance and the roads were blocked with carriages a quarter of a mile away. (There had been an announcement that the Duke of Clarence — by then already King William IV and was to be crowned one week later — was to attend, but he did present the organ to the parish.)

By 1879 the churchyard had become full and, from then on, burials took place at the new Hampton Cemetery which was opened that year on Holly Bush Lane.

Also in 1879, the organ, originally in the centre of the west gallery, was moved to its present position in the north-west corner of the church when a surpliced choir was begun. It was later reconstructed in 1901.

The interior in 1860

The incumbency of Prebendary Digby Ram (1882–1911) saw a resurgence of church life and further development of the building. In 1885 the box pews were removed and replaced with the current ones, and the nave was refurbished. As a sign of the new life coming to the parish, when the building was re-opened by Bishop Walsham How, there immediately followed the first Confirmation service since the building was opened in 1831. To mark Queen Victoria's Golden Jubilee (1887) the chancel was built together with the impressive Heaton, Butler and Bayne east window – inspired by the Te Deum. The window on the north side of the chancel is the 'Magnificat' window and that on the south side is the ‘Nunc Dimittis’ window.

The stained-glass windows on the north and south walls are by Eric Fraser. These depict the Annunciation on the north wall and the four Archangels (Michael, Raphael, Gabriel and Uriel) on the south wall.

In 1920 the church was re-ordered and restored again; a war memorial screen was added as a memorial to the fallen of the First World War. Then in 1931 new choir and clergy stalls were added, in keeping with the screen.

A striking feature of the west wall is the mural by Eric Fraser's son, Rev Geoffrey Fraser, painted in 1952–53. The left-hand panel depicts figures from local history, the right-hand panel members of the church of the time (1952–53). Above the River Thames rises the figure of Christ.

In the next decade attention turned to the north aisle. A small chapel was created, with an altar table, reredos, altar rails and with stainless steel fittings. The new chapel was consecrated in 1967.

St Luke's Chapel in the west porch was dedicated in 1990. The doors are etched with two figures, the Virgin Mary and the Archangel Gabriel, taken from drawings by Eric Fraser and presented by his family in his memory.

In the late 1990s a small kitchen and toilet have been added in the north porch. Inside the church a small stage area was created in front of the screen. Floodlighting was installed at the Millennium. In 2005, after an appeal, the exterior stonework was extensively restored and cleaned. In 2013 the toilet area was redeveloped to include two cubicles. At the same time the side chapel was moved to the south aisle, and a flexible space with some chairs was created in the north aisle.

== Churchyard ==
In the graveyard is an unusual, Grade II listed, pyramidal tomb for John Greg (1716–1795), plantation owner in Dominica, and his wife Catharine who died at Hampton in 1819 "full of years and of benevolence".

- Huntingdon Shaw (1660–1710), a blacksmith.
- Tomb of Samuel Lapidge (d. 1806), assistant to Lancelot 'Capability' Brown and later head gardener at Hampton Court. He was the father of Edward Lapidge (1779–1860), an English architect who designed St Mary's, and who is also buried here.
- Tomb of George Lowe (1716–1758) 'father of the royal gardener at Hampton Court'. He was Master gardener to George II and father of George Lowe (b 1740) who planted the Great Vine in 1768 at Hampton Court Palace.
- George FitzClarence 1st Earl of Munster (1794–1842), a peer and soldier.
- Sir William Wightman (1784–1863), a judge.
- Lord Alfred Paget (1816–1888), a soldier, courtier and Liberal politician.
- Sir James Mantle Greenwood (1902–1969) was an advertiser and local politician. In the 1956 Birthday Honours he was awarded a CBE for "political and public services in Southwark" and was knighted in the 1962 Birthday Honours "for political and public services in London".
- Hugh Campbell (1837–1877) Captain of the royal yacht HMY Victoria and Albert, who was born in Long Ditton and died of typhoid at Hampton Court Palace.

== Church life ==
The church continues to have an active congregation and is a member of Churches Together around Hampton. In 2013, St Mary's opened a primary school in Oldfield Road as part of the Free School programme.

Hampton School gathers in the church on its Founder's Day each year.

== In literature ==
The church is briefly mentioned in Jerome K Jerome's 1889 comic novel, Three Men in a Boat.

Harris wanted to get out at Hampton Church, to go and see Mrs. Thomas’s tomb.

“Who is Mrs. Thomas?” I asked.

“How should I know?” replied Harris. “She’s a lady that’s got a funny tomb, and I want to see it.”

While the church does contain a memorial to Susanna Thomas (d.1731) on the east wall of the south aisle, Paul Goldsac, in his book River Thames: In the Footsteps of the Famous, states there is little that is funny, or even remarkable about it. However, the tomb is floridly classical, with partly draped female figures which may have surprised some Victorians and amused others, including J K Jerome himself. Hence the tomb is "funny" in both senses, of being unusual as well as entertaining.

== Sources ==
- Ripley, Henry. History and Topography of Hampton on Thames (1884)
- Heath, G. D. Hampton in the Nineteenth Century. Twickenham Local History Society (1993)
- Atkins, F. C. E. A Short Guide to the Parish Church of St Mary the Virgin, Hampton (1992)
