= Spitalfields Sculpture Prize =

Commission for a new public work In London

The Spitalfields Sculpture Prize is a £45,000 commission for a new public work to be sited in Bishops Square in the Spitalfields area of London. It is projected that it will be seen by more than 70,000 people a week. The winning sculpture will become a permanent part of the Spitalfields Public Art Collection and go on display in October 2010.

The 8 shortlisted artists are: Wenqin Chen, Cinimod Studio, Paul Friedlander, Ryan Gander, Elpida Hadzi-Vasileva, Tod Hanson, Nick Hornby (artist), Kenny Hunter.

Kenny Hunter was the winner of the Spitalfields Sculpture Prize. His work "I Goat" was hand-sculpted, it was stood on top of packing crates and was measured around 3.5 meters tall. The design inspiration came from the rich history and characteristics of Spitalfields and London.
