= Frank Lynn Jenkins =

British sculptor

- Born: 14 April 1870; Torquay, Devon, England
- Died: 1 September 1927 (aged 57)
- Education: South London Technical School of Art; Royal Academy Schools
- Known for: Sculpture
- Spouse: Phoebe Harriet Le Févre

Frank Lynn Jenkins (14 April 1870 – 1 September 1927) was a British sculptor.

== Biography ==
Frank Lynn Jenkins was born in Torquay, Devon, the son of Henry Tozer Jenkins, a stonemason and marble merchant. He received his initial training in his father's workshop. He then studied at Western College in Weston-super-Mare, at the South London Technical School of Art in Lambeth and, from 1893, at the Royal Academy Schools in London, where he was taught by Alfred Gilbert and George Frampton, among others. In London he developed a close working relationship with the painter Gerald Moira. Together they created decorative plaster reliefs for various public buildings, including the Trocadero Restaurant in London, the Passmore Edwards Library in Shoreditch and the Hotel Metropole in Folkestone.

Frank Lynn Jenkins was a member of several artists' organisations, including the Art Workers Guild (from 1900) and the Royal Society of British Sculptors, of which he was twice president. He married Phoebe Harriet Le Févre in 1901. In 1916 he moved to New York, where he lived until his death in 1927.
