= John Wenlock Rollins =

English sculptor

- Born: 1862; Redhill, Surrey, England
- Died: 6 June 1940 (aged 77–78); Chelsea, Middlesex, England
- Known for: Sculpture

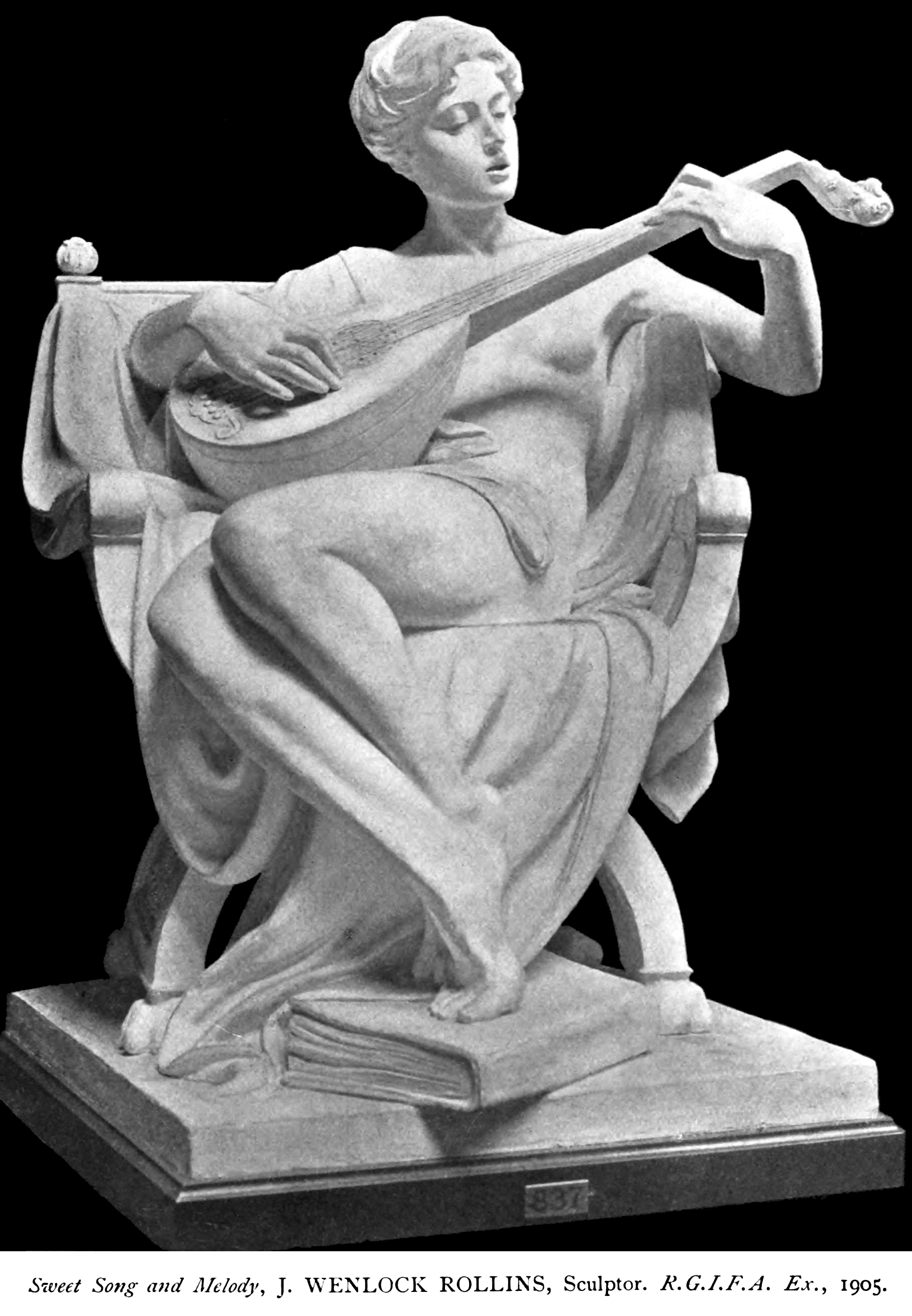
Sweet Song and Melody (1905) by Rollins

John William Wenlock Rollins (1862 – 6 June 1940) was an English sculptor. He is known for his work in architectural sculpture, and considered to be among the members of the New Sculpture movement.

== Early life ==
John Wenlock Rollins would train at the Birmingham School of Art, the South London Technical Art School under William Silver Frith, and at the Royal Academy Schools.

Rollins would exhibit at the Royal Academy from 1887. He would become a member of the Royal Society of British Sculptors in 1906.

== Works ==
Among Rollins' most significant works are his architectural sculpture, designing or producing works for:

- Hewell Grange (1890)
- St George's Hall, Liverpool (1892)
- Croydon Town Hall (1895)
- General Hospital, Birmingham (1897)
- Midland Hotel, Birmingham (1903)
- Royal Victoria Hospital, Belfast (1903)
- Victoria and Albert Museum (1905)
- 14-16 Cockspur Street (1907)
