= Eric Fraser (illustrator) =

British illustrator, graphic designer and educator (1902–1983)

- Born: Eric George Fraser; 1 June 1902; Westminster, London, England
- Died: 15 November 1983 (aged 81); Penn's Place, Hampton, London, England
- Resting place: St Mary's Parish Church
- Occupations: Illustrator; graphic designer; educator
- Spouse: Irene Grace Fraser (m. 1925)
- Children: 4

Academic background
- Education: Westminster School of Art; Goldsmith’s College of Art

Academic work
- Institutions: Camberwell School of Art and Crafts; Reimann School of Art and Design

Eric George Fraser (11 June 1902 – 15 November 1983) was a British illustrator, graphic designer and educator. He was famous in the public mind for contributions to the Radio Times, and as the creator in 1931 of 'Mr Therm' in adverts for the Gas Light and Coke Company.

== Biography ==
Fraser was born on 11 June 1902 in Westminster, London to George James Fraser (1872–1949), a solicitor’s clerk, and Matilda Emily Fraser (née Peartree; 1871–1921). a teacher. Educated at Westminster City School, Fraser began attending the evening classes at the Westminster School of Art in 1916. Awarded a scholarship to Goldsmith’s College of Art in 1919, Fraser studied under E. J. Sullivan, Harold Speed, and Clive Gardiner.

In 1926, Fraser began teaching figure composition, poster design, and book illustration at Camberwell School of Art and Crafts. Given a part-time position in 1928, Fraser continued to teach at Camberwell until 1940. Fraser also briefly taught fashion and figure composition at the Reimann School of Art and Design from 1938 to 1939.

Fraser illustrated scenes from mythology, such as Beowulf fighting the dragon. With pen and ink he illustrated legendary scenes and several works of Shakespeare. Many of the drawings for the jackets designed in the 1960s for the Everyman's Library series (published by J. M. Dent & Sons Ltd in Britain and E. P. Dutton in America) were executed by Fraser. He also illustrated J. R. R. Tolkien's books, such as redrawing the original illustrations for The Lord of the Rings by Ingahild Grathmer (Queen Margrethe 2. of Denmark) for the Folio Society in 1977, as well as the artwork for the 1981 BBC radio adaptation, including the cover of the Radio Times featuring its launch. He also produced designs for Royal Mail.

== Personal life ==
On 4 April 1925, Fraser married Irene Grace Lovett (1903–1996) with whom he had four children. Moving to Penn's Place in Hampton in 1935, Fraser worked in his garden studio until a week before his death. Fraser died from leukaemia at Penn's Place on 15 November 1983, and was buried at the churchyard of St Mary's Parish Church.
