= Nick Hornby (artist) =

British artist (born 1980)

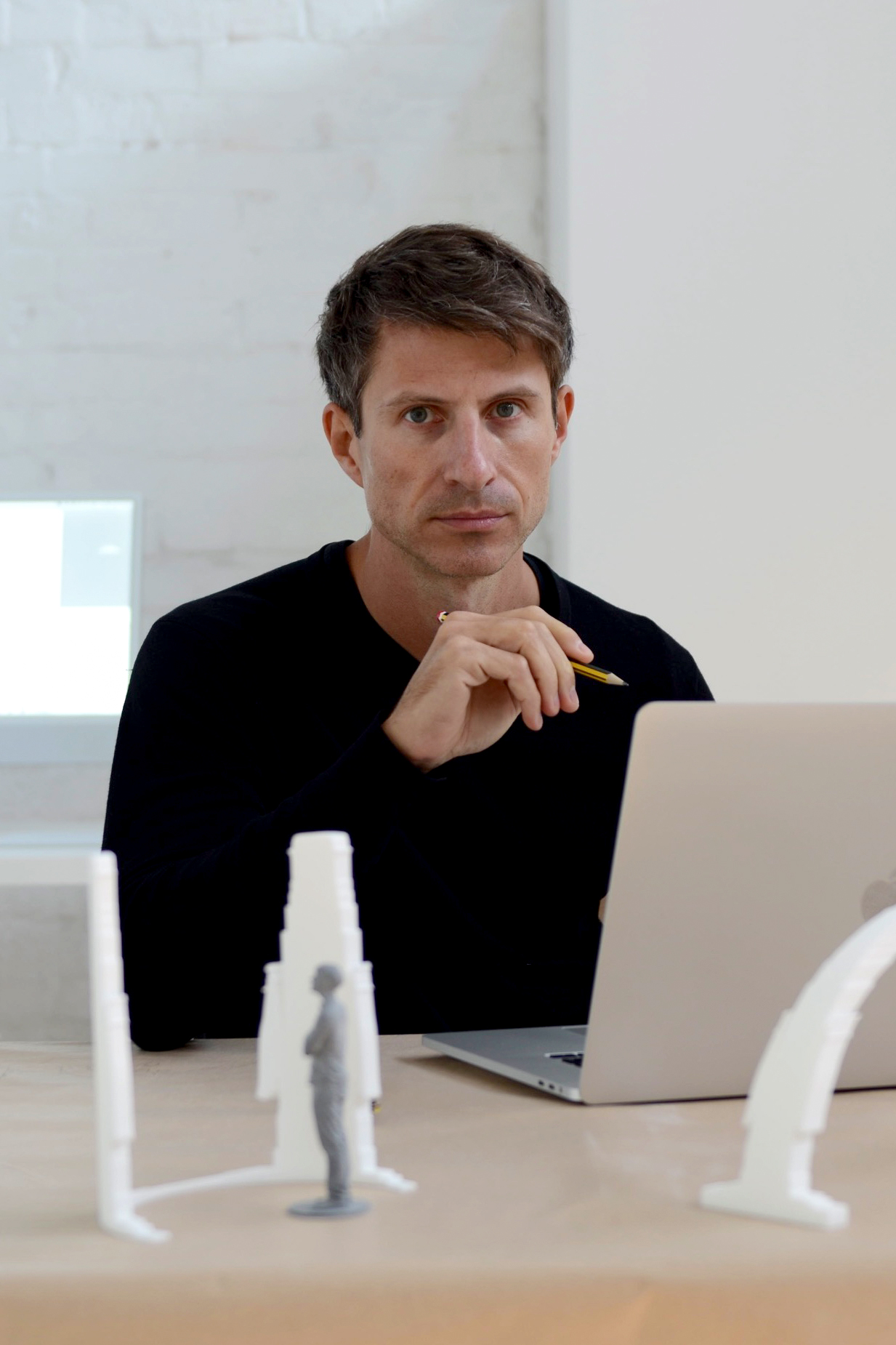
- Hornby in his studio in London
- Born: 11 May 1980 (age 46); London, United Kingdom
- Education: Slade School of Fine Art, University College London; Chelsea College of Arts, University of the Arts London
- Known for: Sculpture, Public Art
- Elected: Vice President of The Royal Society of Sculptors, Fellow of The Royal Society of Sculptors, Elected to The Royal Mint Advisory Committee
- Website: nickhornby.com

Nick Hornby (born 1980) is a British sculptor based in London. He creates monumental site-specific works, that combine digital software with traditional materials such as bronze, steel and marble. His work explores the legacy of monuments, themes of historical critique, semiotics and digital technologies.

In 2026, he became the Vice President of the Royal Society of Sculptors. He is a Fellow and Trustee.

In 2025, he was appointed to a five-year term on the Royal Mint Advisory Committee which advises on designs for UK coins, official medals, seals and decorations.

He has exhibited at Tate Britain, The Southbank Centre, The Museum of Arts and Design (New York) and is represented in collections including The Roberts Institute of Art. His work has been reviewed in the New York Times, Frieze, Artforum, and featured in The BBC, Wired, The Art Newspaper, and his 2022 monograph (published by Anomie), includes a foreword by Luke Syson.

== Early life and education ==
He received his education at the Slade School of Art, and Chelsea College of Art. His early practice was rooted in digital experimentation, engaging with emerging technologies before their mainstream adoption. At the Slade, he worked with Video and Installation, using object-oriented programming software such as MAX MSP. During an exchange at the School of the Art Institute of Chicago, he joined the group “Radical Software Critical Artware.” He later became a resident at Eyebeam, the pioneering not-for-profit art and technology centre in New York. His use of the digital processes trace back to this formative period of new media experimentation. Though his sculptures are fabricated in traditional materials such as bronze, steel, and marble, their forms are shaped by his exploration of technology early in his career. On his MFA at Chelsea College of Art, his focus shifted to literary theory and semiotics leading him to sculpture.

== Career ==
After Graduating from Chelsea in 2009, he was awarded the University of the Arts London Sculpture Prize, ES Magazine once referred to him as “The New Gormley” and picked for the Evening Standard “Who to Watch”. Following this he received a commission from Tate during their Triennial’s Altermodern (2009) and in the same year for the Southbank Centre in connection to the Hayward’s show, Walking in My Mind (2009). His first solo show, Atom vs. Super Subject (2010), featured works that blended multiple art-historical references within a single form. These works were typically monochromatic and cast in synthetic marble or bronze.

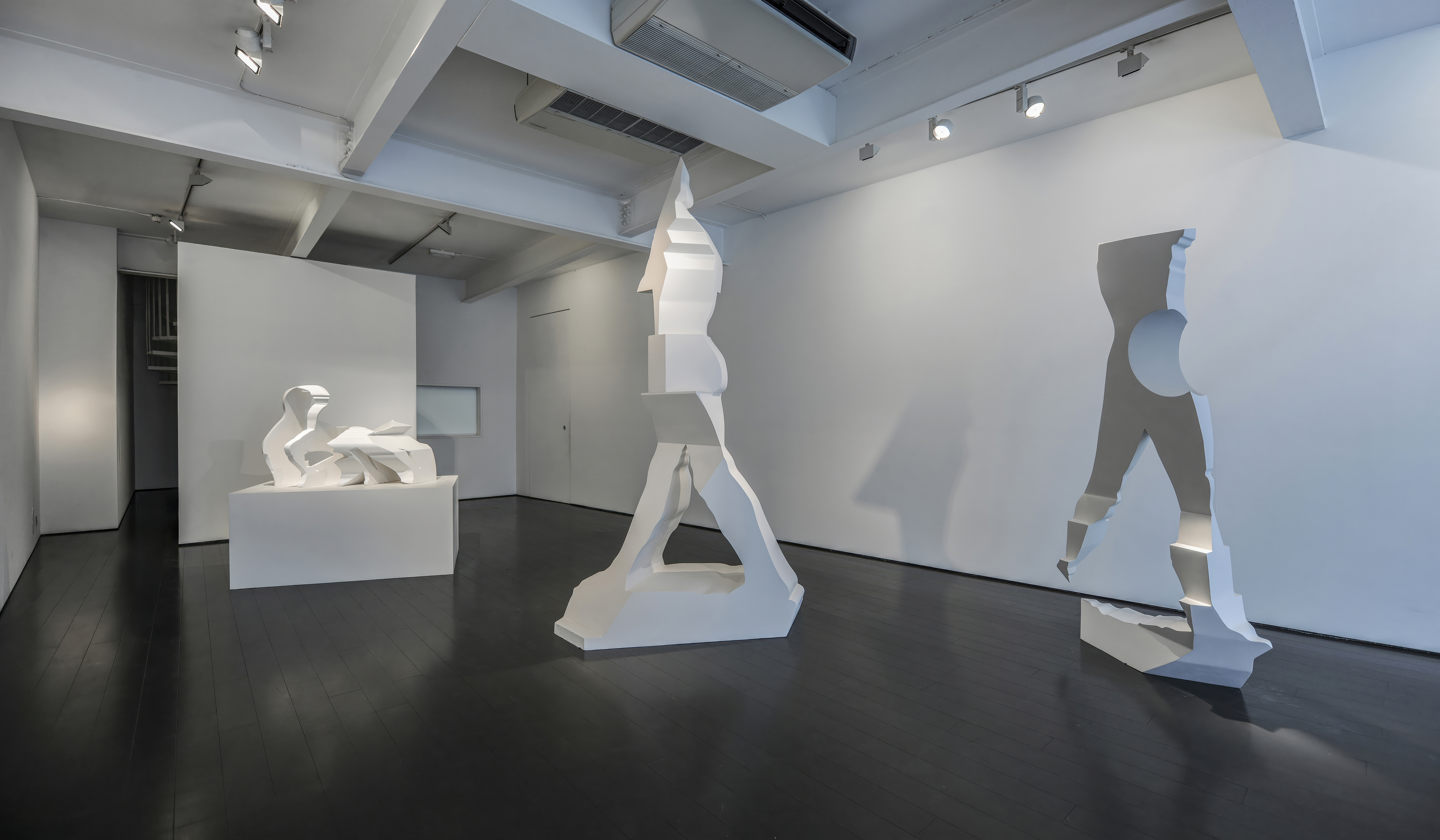
Installation View: Atom vs Super Subject, 2010. Alexia Goethe Gallery, London

In 2020, Hornby’s solo exhibition, Zygotes and Confessions, at Mostyn, (curated by Alfredo Cramerotti) introduced the digital image onto the surface of his sculptures. This marked a critical shift in his career away from the monochromatic art-historical blended works towards autobiography themes of identity, digital reproduction, and the instability of meaning in a hyper-mediated age. He adopted a process of hydrographic dipping to apply a liquified photograph over the surface of the sculptures with a hyper-glossy finish.

== Public commissions ==
Hornby has completed four public commissions in the UK, which critically engage with the legacy of monuments. These include:

- Power over Others is Weakness Disguised as Strength (2023) – Orchard Place, Westminster, London. A five-meter-high 6.5 tonne steel sculpture commissioned by Northacre. From one viewpoint, passers-by will see a man on horseback - as they walk around the work, this image dissolves into a curling line inspired by a squiggle printed in the eighteen-century novel Tristram Shandy
- Here and There (2023) – One Kensington Gardens, London. A bronze work composed of the figure from Wanderer above the Sea of Fog, by Caspar David Friedrich intersected with a wavy line printed in Tristram Shandy
- Do It All (2023) – Royal Warwick Square, Kensington. A monumental bronze sculpture juxtaposing the profile of Nefertiti with the Albert Memorial.
- Twofold (2019) – Installed in Harlow, this work intersects Michelangelo’s David with abstract geometries inspired by Kandinsky.

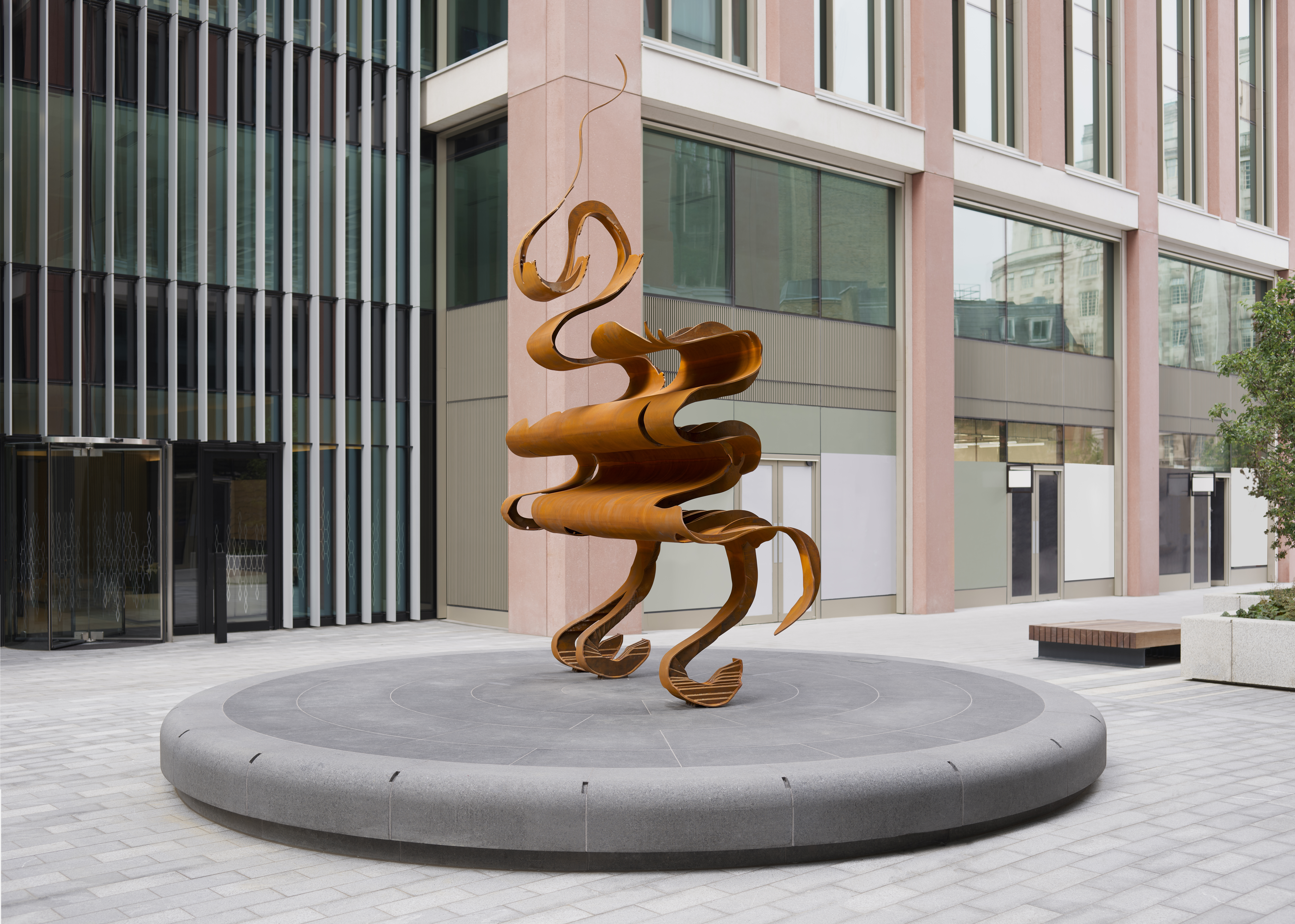
Power over others is Weakness disguised as Strength, Nick Hornby, 2023, Orchard Place, Westminster, London, UK

Other notable commissions include a presentation of monumental sculpture at Glyndebourne Opera House in the UK, and 'Bird God Drone,' Commissioned by Two Trees Management Co, in partnership with NYC Parks’ Art in the Parks program for outdoor presentation in DUMBO, Brooklyn, NY,

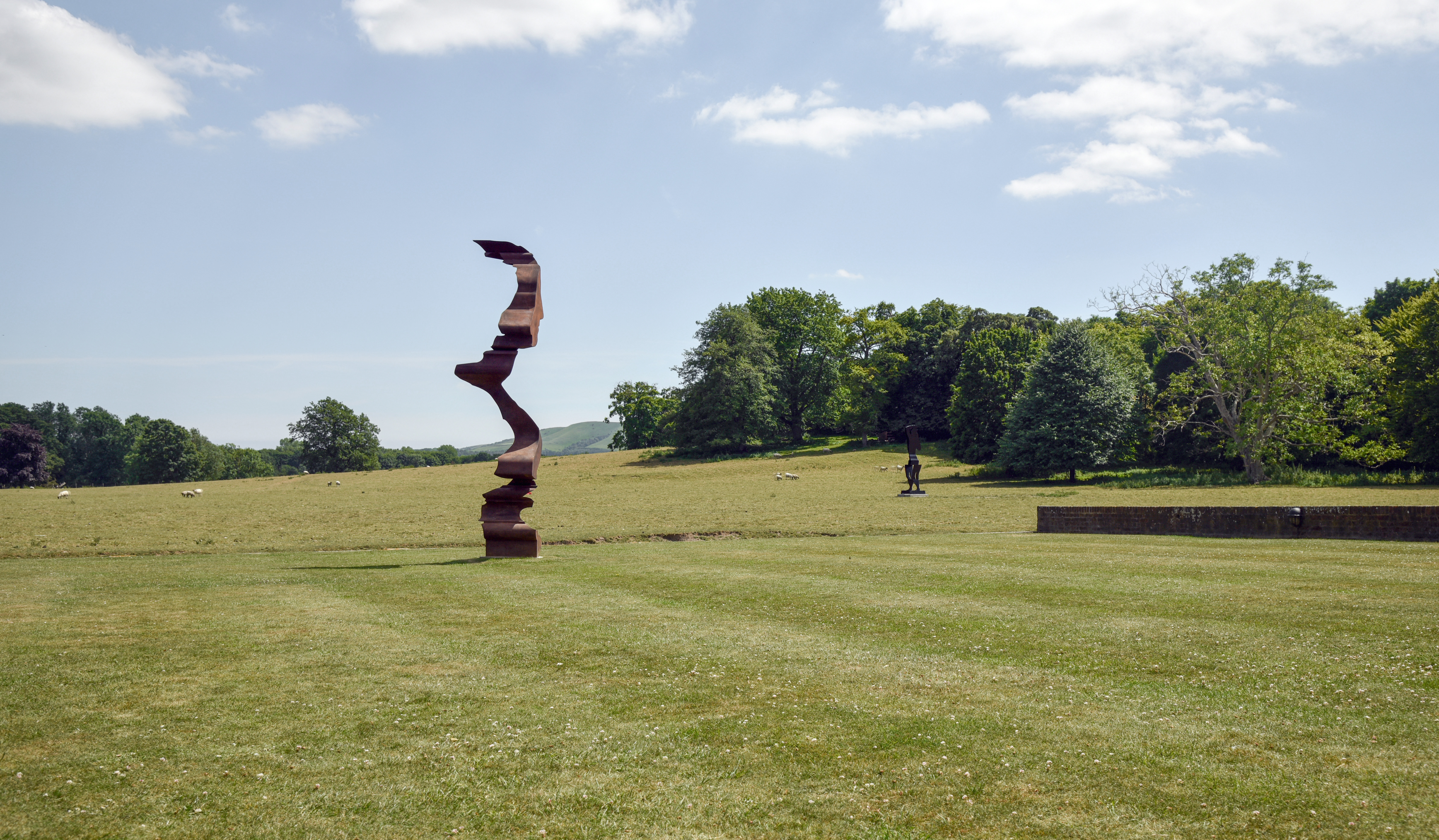
"Muse Offcut #1," 2017, Glyndebourne, UK

== Artistic style and themes ==
Hornby’s sculptures often intersect multiple references, creating hybrid forms relating to the history of representation. He employs advanced digital modelling techniques to generate compositions that blur the boundaries between abstraction and figuration. His work examines the tension between authorship and collective cultural memory, referencing thinkers such as Roland Barthes, and Jacques Derrida.

His Intersection series (ongoing since 2009) exemplifies this approach, merging fragments of canonical artworks into unified yet unstable forms that shift in meaning depending on the viewer’s position. Works from the series, such as Power over Others is Weakness Disguised as Strength, (2023), challenge the authority of traditional monuments by deconstructing and reassembling their visual language. Through this method, Hornby explores the dynamics of cultural memory, questioning how meaning is constructed and altered over time.

== Critical responses ==
Hornby’s work has been covered by art publications such as Frieze, Artforum, and The Art Newspaper. He has also been covered more broadly in The New York Times, the BBC, Wired and Vogue. Critics have discussed his sculptures in relation to traditional sculptural tropes and classical traditions as well as technology and digital fabrication.

Ara H. Merjian, art historian and Professor of Italian Studies at New York University, wrote in Frieze Magazine: “This recent body of work seems more predominantly concerned with a rigorous approach to subtractive form, and a play between corporeal figuration and geometric abstraction. The results so far have been outstanding.”

== Publications ==
This first major monograph on Hornby includes a foreword by Luke Syson, director of the Fitzwilliam Museum, Cambridge, an essay by Dr. Hannah Higham, Senior Curator at the Royal Academy, and an interview with Dr. Helen Pheby, Head of Curatorial Programme at Yorkshire Sculpture Park. The texts mention Hornby’s inspirations, methods, materials, and views on collaboration and public art.

== Selected exhibitions ==
- Copy That / 收到 - Ningbo Contemporary Art Museum, China (2026)
- Zygotes and Confessions – MOSTYN, Wales (2020)
- Atom vs. Super Subject – Alexia Goethe Gallery, London (2010)
- Walking in Our Mind – The Southbank Centre, London (2009)
- The Ghost in the Machine – Tate Britain (2009)

== Awards and recognition ==
- Elected Vice-President of the Royal Society of Sculptors
- Fellow of the Royal Society of Sculptors (FRSS)
- 2025 Appointed to the Royal Mint Advisory Committee (RMAC).
- 2024 PSSA Marsh Award for Excellence in Public Sculpture Public Vote
- 2019 MOSTYN Open 21 'Audience Award' Prize
- 2010 RBKC Artists' Professional Development Bursary
- 2009 Awarded Deidre Hubbard Sculpture Award
- 2009 Shortlisted Spitalfields Sculpture Prize
- 2009 Shortlisted Mark Tanner Sculpture Award
- 2008 UAL Clifford Chance Sculpture Award
