= Flora Kendrick =

British artist (1880–1969)

Florence Ada Kendrick, later Flora Shipp, (1880–1969) was a British artist, notable both as a watercolour painter and sculptor of bronze busts and statuettes.

== Biography ==
Kendrick was born in Margate in southern England, and her father, Joseph Thomas Kendrick, was a self-employed engraver. Kendrick studied at the Royal College of Art in London and, from the 1910s until 1957, regularly exhibited sculpture figures and portraits at the Royal Academy. She also exhibited at the Paris Salon, with the Royal West of England Academy and in Scotland with both the Royal Glasgow Institute of the Fine Arts and the Royal Scottish Academy. From 1908 to 1919, Kendrick exhibited with the Society of Women Artists and was elected an Associate member of the Royal Society of British Sculptors.

In 1919 Kendrick married the art historian and critic Horace Shipp. For many years, she lived at Hampstead in north London, where she died in 1969.
