= Elpida Hadzi-Vasileva =

Macedonian sculptor

- Born: 1971 (age 54–55); Kavadarci, SFR Yugoslavia
- Education: Glasgow School of Art, Royal College of Art
- Known for: Sculpture, installation, and architectural interventions
- Patrons: Holy See, Middlesbrough Institute of Modern Art

Elpida Hadzi-Vasileva (born August 1971) is a site specific installation artist who works across sculpture, installation, and architectural interventions.

Hadzi-Vasileva has lived and worked in United Kingdom since 1992 and primarily in Sussex since 2004. In 2004, she was awarded British citizenship.

== Personal life and education ==
Hadzi-Vasilev was born in Kavadarci, now North Macedonia. She is a granddaughter of the journalist and politician Mito Hadzi-Vasilev Jasmin and a niece of painter Petar Mazev. In 1986 she moved to Novi Sad to study graphic design at Bogdan Suput, graduating high school in 1990. As the war spread across Yugoslavia, she returned to Macedonia. In 1992, she travelled to the United Kingdom and started studying at the Royal Central School of Speech and Drama. From 1993 to 1996 she studied for her BA in sculpture at the Glasgow School of Art and between 1996 and 1998 for an MA in sculpture at the Royal College of Art.

== Works ==
Hadzi-Vasileva's first major UK exhibition entitled Making Beauty took place in Nottingham, United Kingdom in 2016.

In 2023, Hadzi-Vasilev sculpted, charred and gilded the remains of an ancient elm tree in Brighton, UK.

== Recognition ==
Hadzi-Vasileva has been the recipient of a number of awards. These include the Golden Osten Award (2016) and the Grand Prix (2017). She was recipient of the Pollock-Krasner Foundation award in 2002, was shortlisted for the Jerwood Sculpture Prize (2001), and the Spitalfields Sculpture Prize (2010). In 2009, she won the STEP Beyond Mobility Fund by the European Cultural Foundation. In 2010, she received an award of recognition for special achievements in the field of Fine Art for the development of the town of Kavadarci by the national Assembly of Kavadarci, Macedonia. She won the 2013 Alexandra Reinhardt Memorial Award to develop a new commission for the Middlesbrough Institute of Modern Art and Engage.

Hadzi-Vasileva was selected to represent Macedonia at the 55th International Art Exhibition Venice Biennale in 2013, and, in 2015 she was commissioned by the Vatican for the Pavilion of the Holy See, at the 56th Venice Biennale. Other awards were awarded to her from Wellcome Trust in 2014–2015, the Arts Council England in 2016, 2019, 2020 and 2021.
