= Warwick Road, Earl's Court =

Street in Earl's Court, London

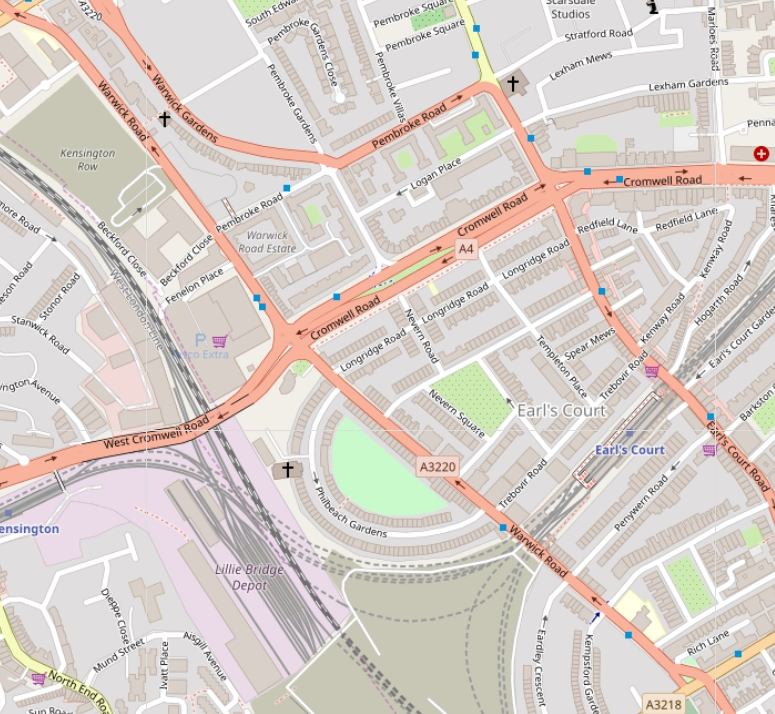
- Warwick Road area map
- Area: Earl's Court
- Location: Royal Borough of Kensington and Chelsea
- Coordinates: 51.49237°N 0.19971°W

Construction
- Construction start: c. 1822

Other
- Known for: Earls Court Exhibition Centre (former); Earl's Court Station western entrance; Warwick Road Estate

Warwick Road is located in the Earl's Court district of the Royal Borough of Kensington & Chelsea in London. The road began to be laid out around 1822 and was gradually extended south to Old Brompton Road over a number of decades. It is a major north–south traffic route in west London.

Its buildings include the Warwick Road Estate, designed by Arup Associates, Warren House, the western entrance to Earl's Court Station, and the apartment blocks which replaced the old Earls Court Exhibition Centre.

== Location ==
Warwick Road runs from the junction of Kensington High Street and Holland Road in the north to the junction of Old Brompton Road and Finborough Road in the south. It is crossed by the Cromwell Road which becomes the West Cromwell Road, and joined by a number of minor roads. Both ends of the crescent Philbeach Gardens join Warwick Road on its west side.

The Survey of London describe the character of Warwick Road, part of the A3220, as "largely determined by its role as a major traffic route".

== History and architecture ==
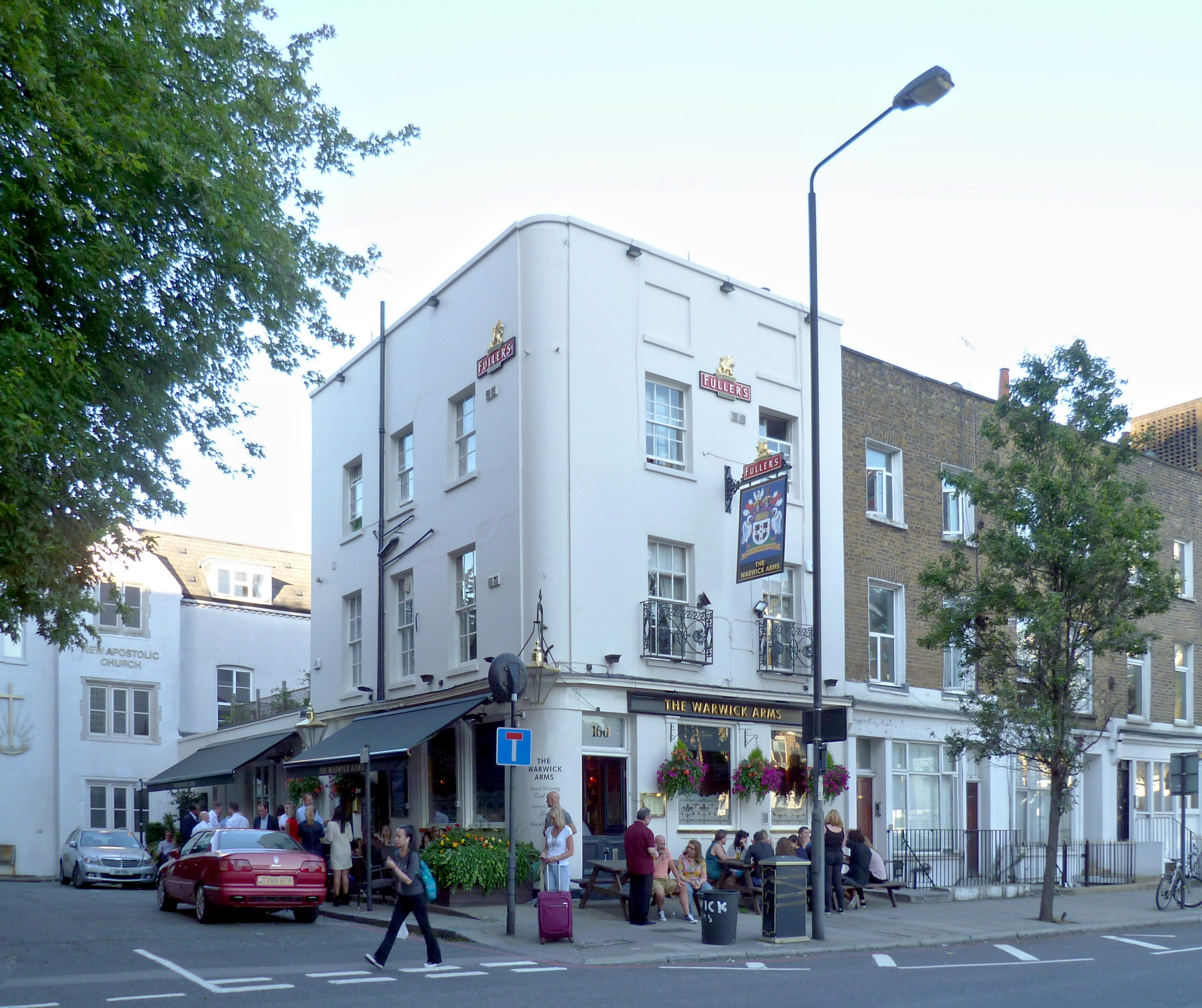
The Warwick Arms public house

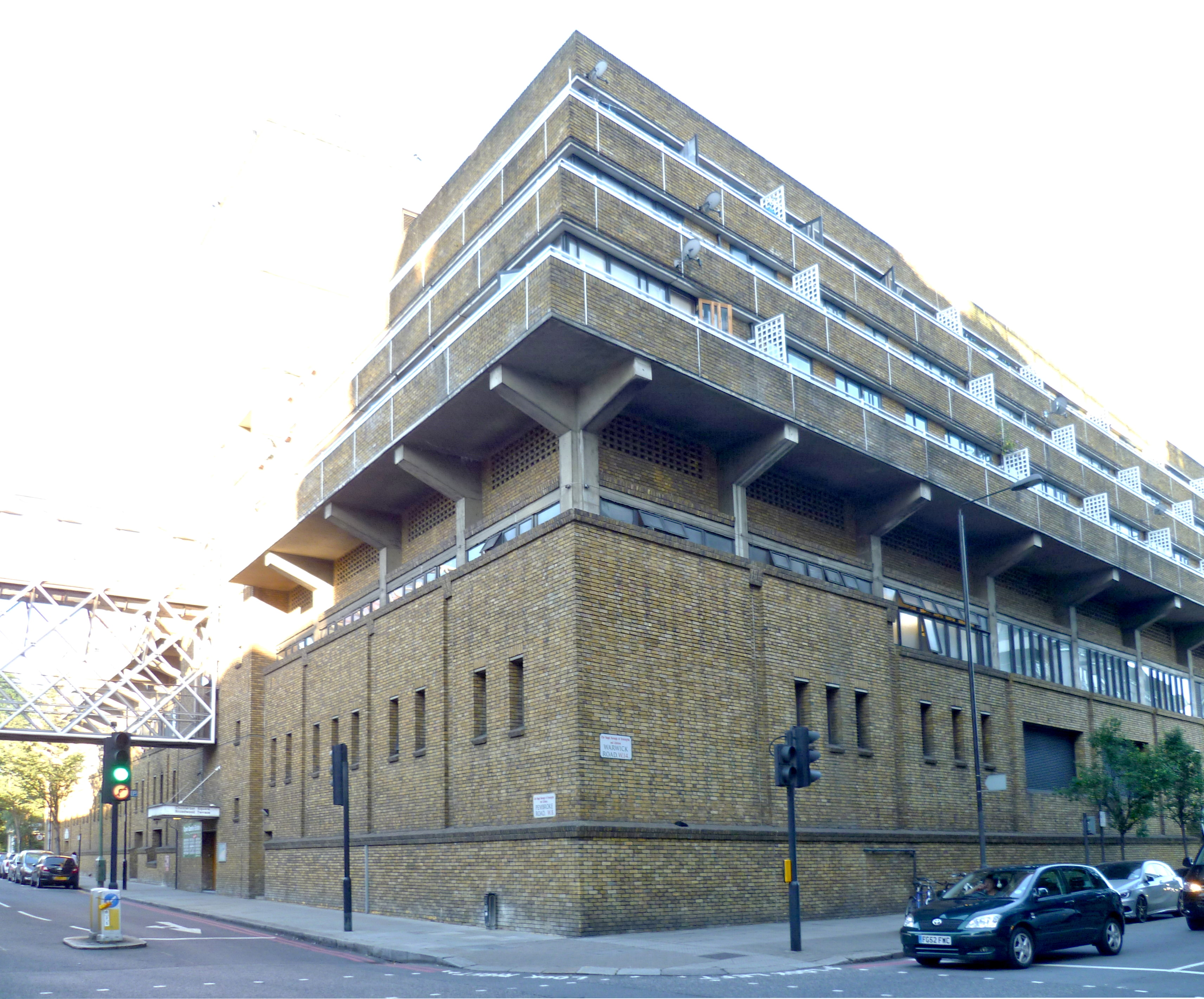
The southern block of the Warwick Road Estate with pedestrian bridge over Pembroke Road (left)

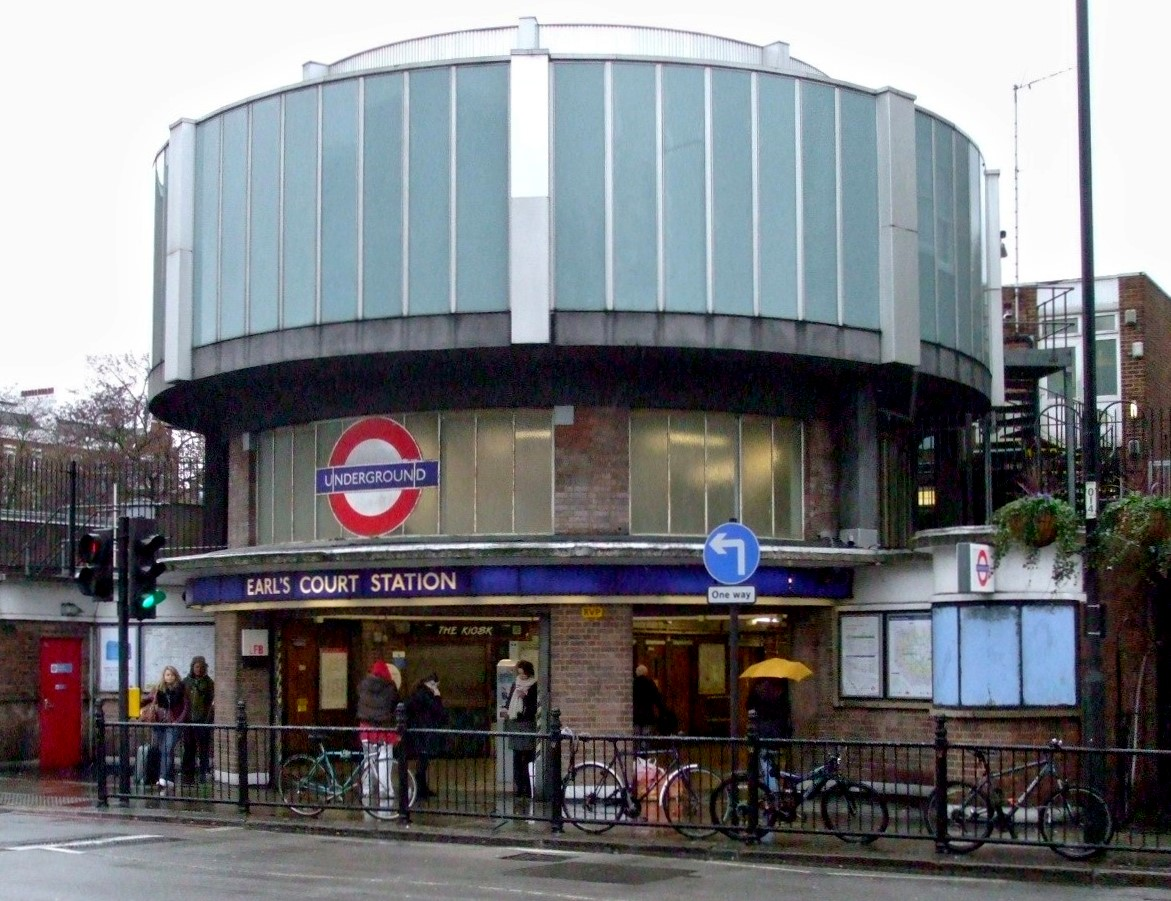
Earl's Court Station western entrance

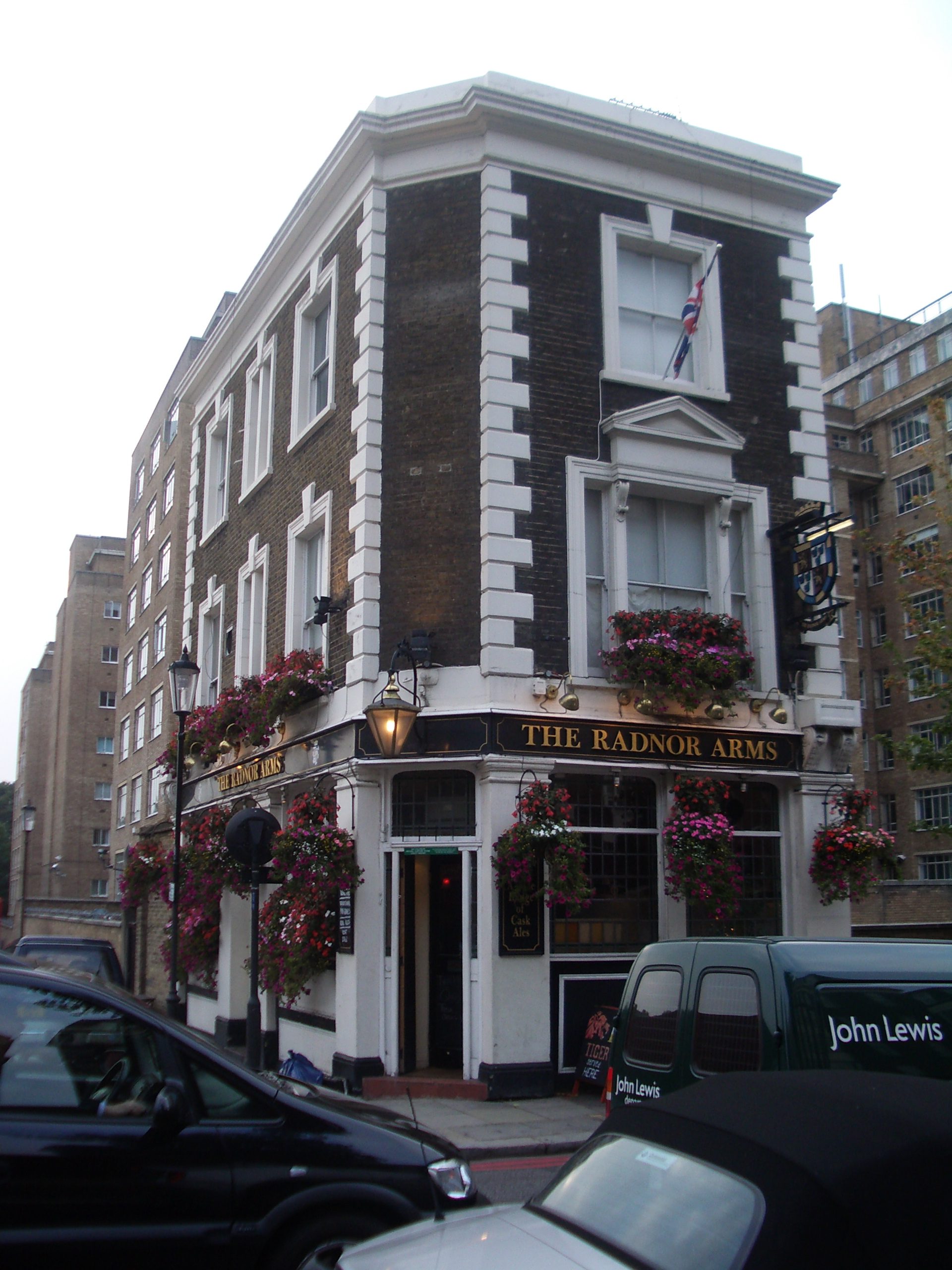
The Radnor Arms public house in 2005, before its demolition to make way for luxury flats

Warwick Road was laid out from around 1822, when it was known as Moiety Road, and gradually extended south to Old Brompton Road over a number of decades.

Notable buildings include the Warwick Road Estate of Broadwood Terrace, Chesterton Square, and associated buildings, which is on the east side of the road, bisected by Pembroke Road with the north and south blocks joined by a pedestrian bridge. It was built by Mowlem from 1972 to 1975 to a design by Arup Associates. Plans to redevelop or demolish it have led to calls for it to be listed, however, a certificate of immunity was granted instead in July 2015 which stated that there were no plans to list the buildings before 1 July 2020.

Opposite the north block of the Warwick Road Estate is the post-modern Warren House on the corner with Beckford Close.

Close to the southern end, with its main entrance on Warwick Road, was the Earls Court Exhibition Centre built from 1935 to 1937 and demolished in 2017 to be replaced by apartment blocks and shops. Opposite is the grade II listed 1937 extension to Earl's Court tube station, a rotunda of brick and glass with a 1970s circular atrium that Historic England describe as being of "no merit".

== Crime ==
In October 2017, LGBT rights campaigner Julian Aubrey was found dead with 22 stab wounds at his home in Shaftesbury Place on Warwick Road. His neighbour, Enrique Facelli, a Uruguayan former diplomat, admitted killing him because of a "long-standing" dispute between them, and pleaded guilty to manslaughter by reason of diminished responsibility.
