= Mostyn (gallery) =

Art gallery in Llandudno, Wales

Coordinates: 53.3210°N 3.8238°W

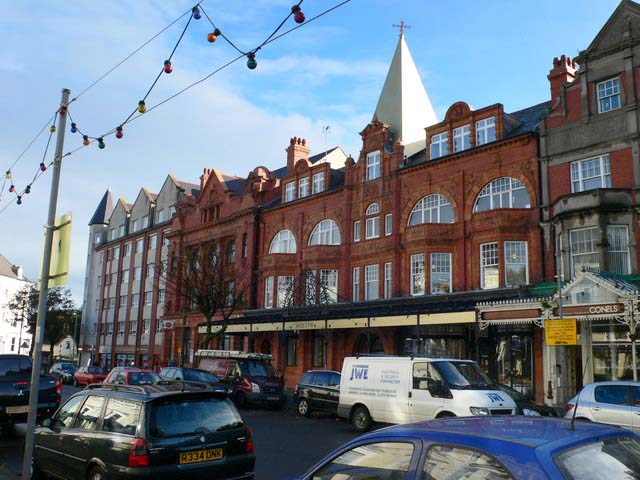
Mostyn, Vaughan Street, Llandudno

Mostyn is a public art gallery in Llandudno, North Wales. It was previously called Oriel Mostyn ('Oriel' is Welsh for 'Gallery') but was rebranded as simply Mostyn following its 2010 revamp.

== Background ==
The roots of the gallery started with a Miss Clarence Whaite (daughter of the president of the Royal Cambrian Academy of Art), who in 1894 set up a meeting of 'lady artistes' at the 'Round room' in Conwy, after an agreement of a name for Miss Whaite's new Society; 'The Gwynedd Ladies' Art Society', Lady Augusta Mostyn, who presided at the meeting was the first to donate £2.2s (~£1500 in 2019 after inflation) which made her the founding member.

The gallery was re-established in 1978 in a building that was originally built for wealthy local arts benefactor and photographer, Augusta Mostyn, in 1901. The original Mostyn Art Gallery ran from 1901 to 1913 and for two years housed works by Gwynedd Ladies Art Society (GLAS) who were denied membership of male dominated local art societies on the basis of their gender. As such it was the first gallery in the world to show exclusively the work of women artists. The three (originally five) bay building, faced in red brick and terracotta, is Grade II listed, as a building by the Mostyn Estate architect, G. A. Humphreys, that helps define Llandudno.

The same Edwardian building became available in the late 1970s and was proposed as the home of a new gallery for North Wales. It was officially opened on 11 August 1979.

It reopened again in May 2010 after a £5 million refurbishment, partly financed by a £3 million grant from the Arts Council of Wales. The refurbishment of the original galleries and the new extension was by Ellis Williams Architects, and won the Gold Medal for Architecture from the National Eisteddfod of Wales in 2011. The gallery rebranded itself as Mostyn, dropping the word 'Oriel' and upsetting some local people by dropping the Welsh prefix.

Mostyn is a charity registered in England and Wales (Mostyn Gallery Limited 507842).

== Facilities ==
The building, retaining its original terracotta facade, has been remodelled internally to create four major exhibition spaces and two smaller areas. It has a cafe, shop and educational facilities.
