= Eleonora Aguiari =

Italian installation artist and author (born 1973)

Eleonora Aguiari (born 1973) is an Italian installation artist and author, who lives between London and Paris. Her best known work consisted of wrapping a historic statue in London in red tape.

== Life ==
Eleonora Aguiari was born in Genoa, Italy. She studied philosophy at the University of Milan. In 1990–7 she founded, and was director of, Zanzibar publishers in Milan, publishing 50 titles. She wrote two books, including Milanoetnica with Marina Gersony. She moved to London in 1998, where she studied at Chelsea College of Art and Design, Central St Martins College of Art and Design and the Royal College of Art (RCA).

== Artistic career ==
In 2004, for her final show at the Royal College of Art, Aguiari wrapped an equestrian statue of Lord Napier of Magdala, situated on Queen's Gate in West London, in bright red duct tape, giving the appearance of the statue being painted red. In order to do this she needed clearance letters from the RCA Rector, a professor, the Victoria and Albert Museum conservation department and the RCA conservation department, bronze tests, a scaffolding license, indemnity insurance, and permission from English Heritage (who own the statue), the City of Westminster, the Boroughs of Chelsea and Kensington (their boundary bisects the length of the horse) and the present Lord Napier.

A layer of cling wrap and almost 80 rolls of red duct tape were applied by four people working for four days. Aguiari described it as "a Zen action up there in the middle of traffic, but alone with a beautiful statue. Every detail on the statue is perfect and slightly larger than normal," and said that "statuary that symbolizes military past, or imperialism should be covered to make the topics of the past visible."

Despite the official clearance and the temporary nature of her action, the international press coverage, including a Reuters press agency photo reproduced in the Daily Times of Pakistan, ensured that a controversy ensued.

Aguiari was not familiar with the metaphorical use of the term "red tape" (meaning pedantic bureaucracy) but this was spotted by the advertising firm of Saatchi and Saatchi, who wanted to use her idea for a "Tory advertising campaign" and asked her to wrap an ambulance in red tape. She rejected the invitation.

In 2005 she was one of the artists selected for the first BLOC show, promoted by Bowieart at County Hall, London.

In 2005–6 she showed a sculpture at Bishops Square, Spitalfields, East London, sponsored by the Spitalfields Development Group. This was a silhouette of the nearby Christ Church Spitalfields and was coloured bright red.

Group shows have included Tomato Gallery (2001) and Bloomberg Space (2004). Her large scale installations include Lamont Road Passage, Chelsea, London, (2003) and Fontebianca (2003).

In 2011, Aguiari had her first solo exhibit in France, "The Last Supper," at the Alberta Pane Gallery.

== See also ==
- Art intervention
- Conceptual art
- Installation art
