= Huntingdon Shaw =

English blacksmith

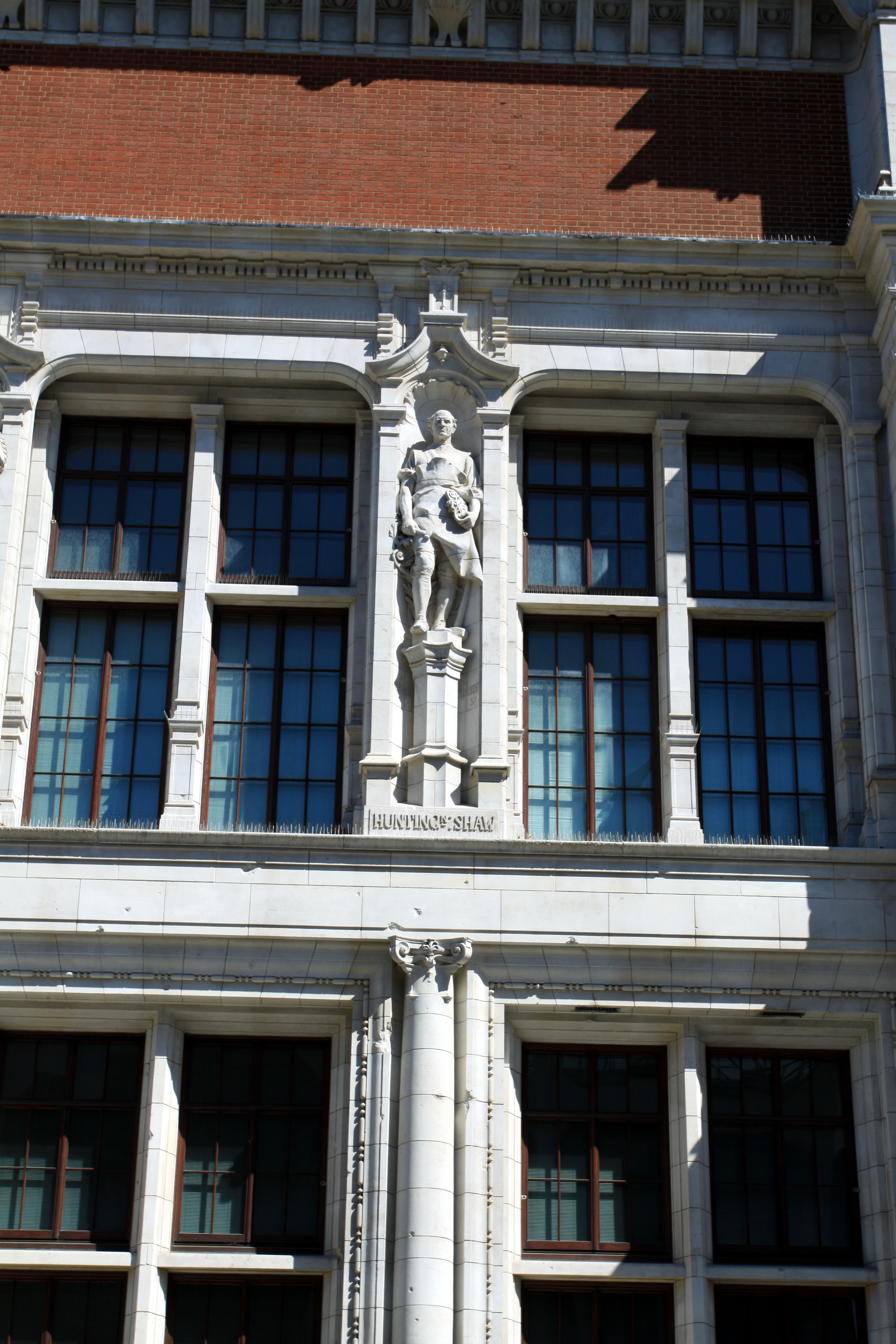
Huntington Shaw, statue on the Victoria and Albert Museum, London

Huntington or Huntingdon Shaw (1660–1710) was an English blacksmith, born in Nottingham.

Shaw was born on 26 June 1660, to John and Sarah Shaw. He worked after the Glorious Revolution at Hampton Court Palace with Jean Tijou, who was making wrought iron gates and screens for the garden. Later, in the 19th century, Shaw was given credit for this work; but it was then shown that the attribution was based on a late church inscription. At the end of the 17th century Shaw was living in Westminster. He is buried at St Mary's Parish Church, Hampton.

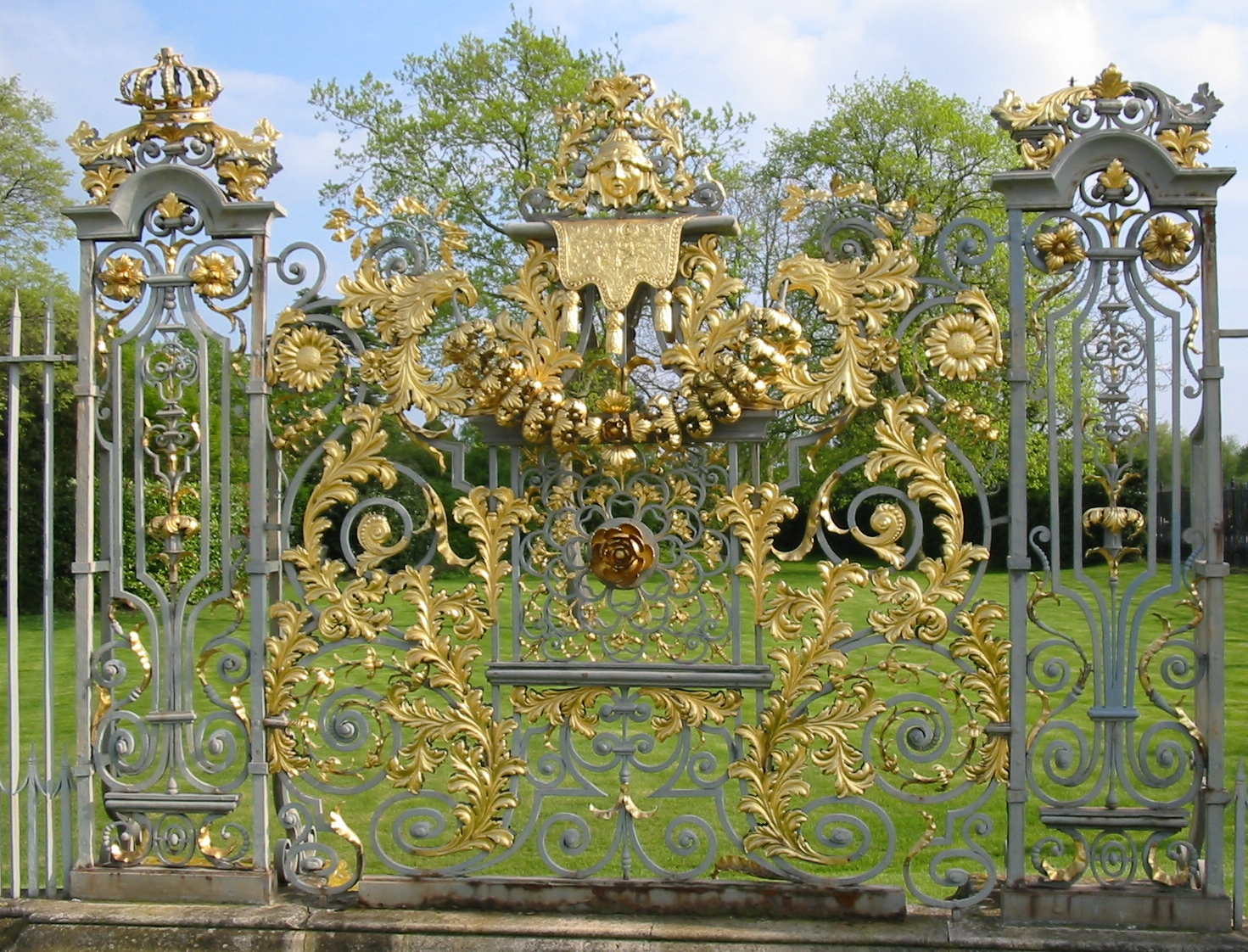
Screen at Hampton Court
