= Václav Vokolek =

Czech writer and painter (born 1947)

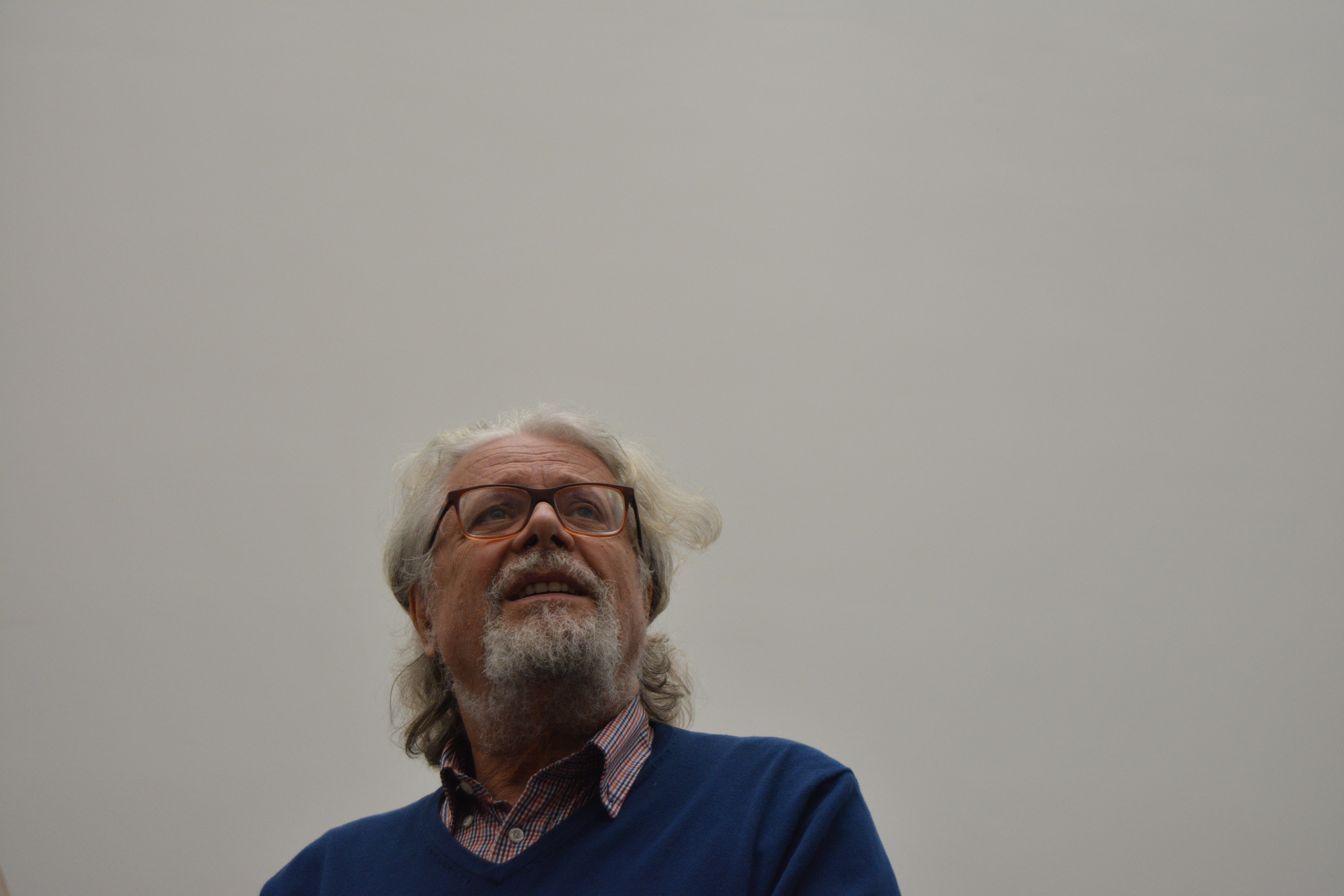
Image of Václav Vokolek

Václav Vokolek (born 1 January 1947) is a Czech writer and painter.

== Books ==
- Nápisy (vlastním nákladem, 1992)
- Lov žen a jiné odložené slavnosti (GMA, Praha 1993)
- Ten který (Turské pole 1993)
- Triptych (Petrov 1995)
- Pátým pádem (Triáda, Praha 1996)
- Zříceninový mramor (Torst, Praha 1996)
- Pán z Halabákova (Vera, Praha 1997)
- Tanec bludných kořenů (Host, Brno 1998)
- Unangenehme Geschichte (Cambria, Hildesheim 1999)
- Cesta do pekel (Triáda, Praha 1999)
- Hercynský les (Periplum, Olomouc 2000)
- Okolím Bábelu (Votobia, Olomouc 2000)
- Nejsme jako my (spolu s J. Strašnovem - Votobia, Olomouc 2001)
- Příliš pozdní léto (Periplum, Olomouc 2003)
- Krajinomalby (Omen 2004)
- Pohled z druhé strany (spolu s M.Pekárkem - Pragma, Praha 1998)
- Tajemství zdraví a naděje (spolu s M. Pekárkem - Eminent, Praha 2000)
- Tajemství geopatogenních zón (spolu s E. Andresem - Eminent, Praha 2002)
- Esoterické Čechy 1. - 2. díl (Eminent, Praha 2004)

== Exhibitions ==
- 1968 Litvínov
- 1969 Gelsenkirchen
- 1977 Praha
- 1977 Blansko
- 1978 Brno
- 1979 Wroclaw
- 1979 Olesnica
- 1980 Budapest
- 1981 Walbrzych
- 1984 Bremen
- 1984 Olomouc
- 1985 Praha
- 1987 Kostelec nad Č. Lesy
- 1990 Roztoky u Prahy
- 1991 Děčín
- 1995 Plzeň
- 1998 Praha
- 2003 Olomouc
- 2003 Děčín
- 2004 Plzeň

== Permanent exhibitions in galleries ==
- Czech national gallery (in exposition)
- Permanent exposition on castle in Bystřice pod Hostýnem (together with Vojmír Vokolek)
- Gallery Louny
- Gallery Pardubice
- Dům umění Olomouc
- BWA Wroclaw
- Gallery Cyrany
- Cloister Plasy
