= Royal Society of Sculptors =

Centre for contemporary sculpture in London

Coordinates: 51.4913°N 0.1793°W

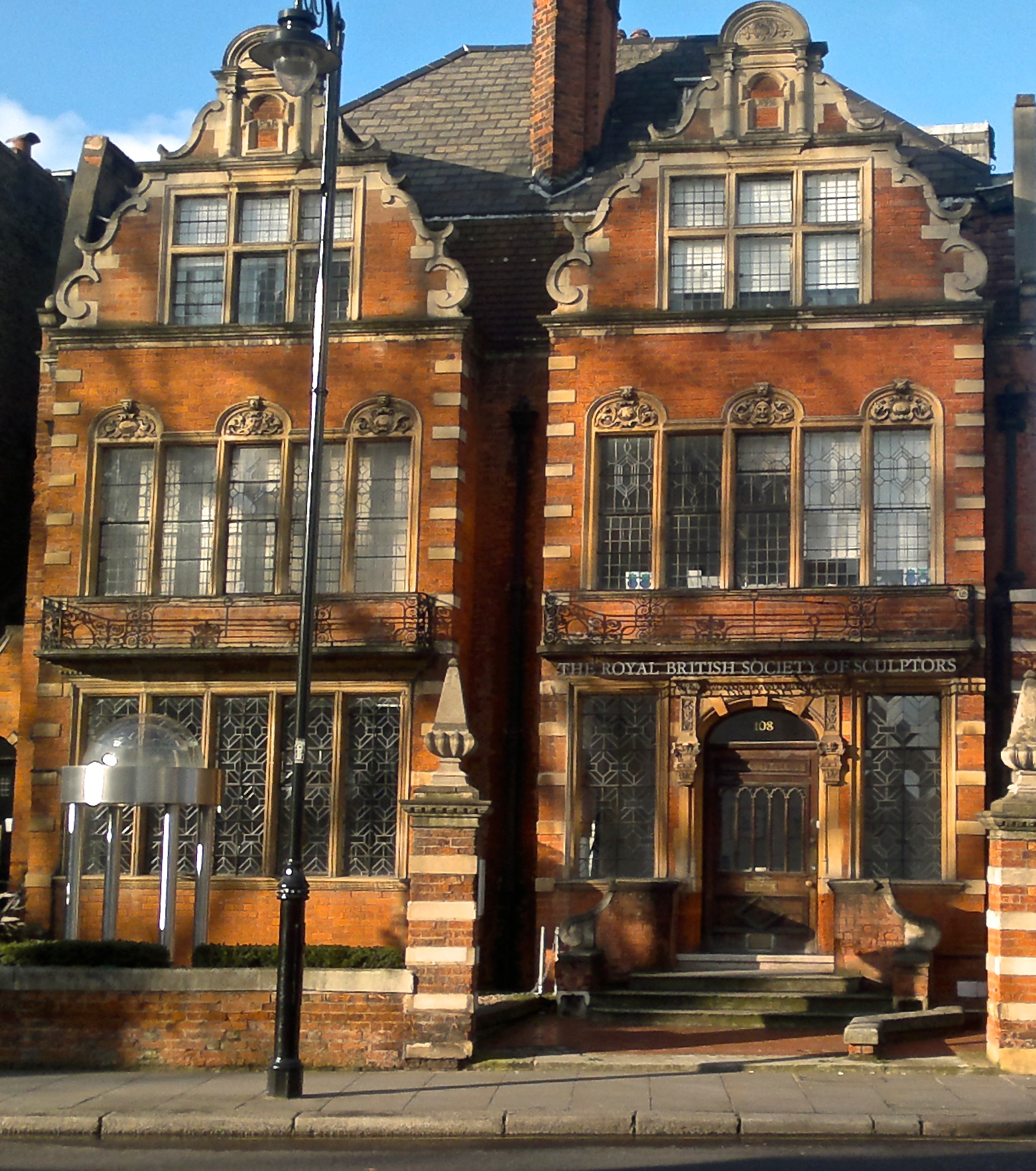
- Dora House, the RSS headquarters
- Established: 1905; 121 years ago
- Headquarters: 108 Old Brompton Road; South Kensington, London, UK
- President: Laura Ford
- Vice President: Nick Hornby
- Website: sculptors.org.uk
- Formerly called: Society of British Sculptors (1905–1911); Royal Society of British Sculptors (1911–2003); Royal British Society of Sculptors (2003–2017)

The Royal Society of Sculptors (RSS) is a British charity established in 1905, which promotes excellence in the art and practice of sculpture. Its headquarters are a centre for contemporary sculpture on Old Brompton Road in South Kensington, London. It is the oldest and largest organisation dedicated to sculpture in the UK. Until 2017, it was known as the Royal British Society of Sculptors. The elected President is Laura Ford and Vice-President is Nick Hornby

The Royal Society of Sculptors is a registered charity with a selective membership of around 700 professional sculptors. It aims to inspire, inform and engage people of all ages and backgrounds with sculpture, and to support sculptors' development of their practice to the highest professional standards.

== History ==
It began as the Society of British Sculptors in 1905, in its first year it had 51 sculptor members. They received royal patronage in 1911, and were renamed the Royal Society of British Sculptors The Society gained charitable status in recognition of its educational activities in 1963. In 1976, the late sculptor Cecil Thomas donated Dora House, 108 Old Brompton Road which has been its headquarters ever since. In 2003 they renamed again to the Royal British Society of Sculptors in recognition of growing international membership before becoming the Royal Society of Sculptors in 2017.

== Structure ==
=== Patronage ===
The society has received Royal Patronage since 1911 and King Charles III is the society's current Patron.

=== Governance ===
The society was founded as a company limited by guarantee in 1905 and has been a registered charity since 1963. It is a selective membership-based organisation, whose members elect its governing council. The council meets regularly to review applications and select new members. The current president of the Board is Laura Ford.

=== Membership ===
There are two types of membership: Members (formerly known as Associates until 2014) and Fellows, who are entitled to use the MRSS and FRSS post-nominal letters. Presidents of the society are entitled to use the post-nominal letters PRSS and Vice Presidents VPRSS.

== Awards ==
=== Current ===
==== First Plinth: Public Art Award ====
Formerly FIRST@108: Public Art Award, the First Plinth is a biennial £10,000 award to contribute towards the production costs of producing a large-scale sculpture, thereby offering competing sculptors the opportunity to extend their practice into competing for public art commissions. Open to any artist working in three dimensions. The award is supported by the Mirisch & Lebenheim Charitable Foundation. The current winner of the First Plinth: Public Art Award 2021 is Polly Morgan.

===== Past winners =====
- Fabio Lattanzi Antinori (2019)
- Rupert Norfolk (2017)
- Tabatha Andrews (2015)
- Sam Shendi (2013)
- Jenske Dijkhuis (2011)
- Robert Worley (2009)

==== Grizedale Residency ====
With thanks to the Brian Mercer Charitable Trust the Society offers an annual residency opportunity based at Grizedale Forest. This intensive six-week-long residency aims to foster experimentation and innovation in response to the natural environment.

Past winners

- Susan Stockwell (2021)
- Florian Houlker (2021)
- Karolin Schwab (2019)
- Ben Allan (2019)

==== Spotlight Award ====
Founded in 2017, Contemporary Sculpture Fulmer is a private sculpture park in Buckinghamshire that surveys the breadth of contemporary sculptural practice. A new area of woodland has been opened out to create an environment for an artist to install a single large work or a series of works creating a solo installation. Society members and fellows are invited to propose new or recent work that is suitable for display outside over summer. The Spotlight exhibition is included on the route taken by all visitors to the gardens, but it is also separate and distinct from the rest of the sculpture trail, and as such applicants are encouraged to engage with the idea of it as a solo exhibition en plain air. The successful applicant works closely with director George Marsh. The current winner is Daniel Solomons.

Past winners

- Tim Ellis (2021)
- Rosie Leventon (2020)
- Amale Freiha Khlat (2019)
- Marco Miehling (2018)

==== Gilbert Bayes Award ====
Established in 2000 as the RBS Bursary Awards, it was renamed in 2018 after the artist Gilbert Bayes, whose charitable trust supports the awards. This is an annual award made to a small group of emerging sculptors that the society has judged to be of outstanding talent and potential. It is designed to aid them in the transition to full professional practice, by giving them a package of professional support including an annual membership of the society. The award is open to sculptors of any age, nationality, with or without formal training and working in any medium. Past winners include: Alex Chinneck, Tessa Farmer and William Mackrell.

==== Eilean Shona Residency ====
Eilean Shona has a history of association with artists and writers. The Royal Society of Sculptors offers a members-only, month-long residency for one selected member to live on the island and respond to its natural environment.

Past winners

- Mhairi Vari (2022)
- Marie-Thérèse Ross (2023)
- Robin Tarbet (2024)
- Amanda Cornish (2025)
- Hazel Reeves (2026)

==== Red House Residency ====
For 20th century composer Benjamin Britten, a place to compose was needed. He was fortunate enough to achieve this for most of his life, spending his last two decades at The Red House, down a lane on the outskirts of Aldeburgh, Suffolk. This retreat at The Red House is open to women members of the Royal Society of Sculptors.

Past winners

- Hannah Honeywill (2020)

Thread Residency

Thread is a residency programme and cultural centre that allows local and international artists to live and work in Sinthian, a rural village in Tambacounda, the southeastern region of Senegal. It houses two artists’ dwellings, as well as ample indoor and outdoor studio space.

Past winners

- Julian Wild (2020)

=== Past awards ===
==== Brian Mercer Residencies ====
Two annual scholarships for society members to experiment with stone or bronze under instruction from master craftsmen in Pietrasanta, Italy enable sculptors to learn the technical aspects of the carving or casting process were supported by the Brian Mercer Charitable Trust.

Lady Feodora Gleichen Memorial Fund (1938–1988)

The Feodora Gleichen Memorial Fund was an annual award of £100 for women sculptors and was made from works shown at the Royal Academy Summer Exhibition or any other exhibition at which works by female sculptors were shown. The Funds were administered by the Royal Academy from 1923 – 1938, after which management passed into the hands of the Royal Society of Sculptors. The fund was established following the death of Lady Feodora Gleichen, who was posthumously voted as one of the first female members of the Society alongside Christine Gregory and Flora Kendrick. Winners included Anne Acheson, Rosamund Fletcher, Karen Jonzen, Lorne McKean and Olivia Musgrave.

==== Otto Beit medal ====
For many years the society awarded the Otto Beit medal, named after and funded by the philanthropist Sir Otto Beit. Winners of the medal include Michael Clark, Sean Crampton, Philip Jackson, Franta Belsky, David Annand, Dennis Huntley, John W. Mills, Anthony J Poole, Michael Rizzello and Judith Bluck.

==== Sculpture Shock ====
Launched in 2013, Sculpture Shock encouraged surprising site-specific spatial interventions in non-traditional spaces outside the confines of a gallery. Three sculptors were awarded £3,000 and a three-month residency in Kensington. The artists then exhibited in one of three environments: Subterranean (the unseen world underneath the city), Ambulatory (without physical confines in movement through space and time) and Historic (an illustrious building in London). Sculpture Shock was supported by private philanthropists.
