= Verein der Berliner Künstlerinnen =

German women artists association

The Verein der Berliner Künstlerinnen (English: Association of Berlin Women Artists) is the oldest existing association of women artists in Germany. It maintains the archive Verein der Berliner Künstlerinnen 1867 e. V., publishes club announcements and catalogues, and every two years awards the Marianne Werefkin Prize to contemporary female artists. It thus cultivates cultural memory and promotes the current developments of contemporary artists. The 2007 award winner was the sculptor Paloma Varga Weisz.

The archive of the association is used, among other things, as a source of dissertations, master's theses and diploma theses on individual artists and the position of artists in training and society. Data from the archive was used for works on Charlotte Berend-Corinth, Käthe Kollwitz, Jeanne Mammen, Paula Modersohn-Becker, Marg Moll, Elisabet Ney, Harriet von Rathlef-Keilmann, and Gertraud Rostosky. Since November 1, 2012, the club archive has been contracted to the Archive of the Academy of Arts (department of fine arts).

The association's cooperation partner is the Berlinische Galerie Landesmuseum for modern art, photography, and architecture. With their help, extensive documentation about the members and sponsors of the association could be created in 1992 for the 125th anniversary of the association, which was published as an encyclopedia of women artists.

== History ==
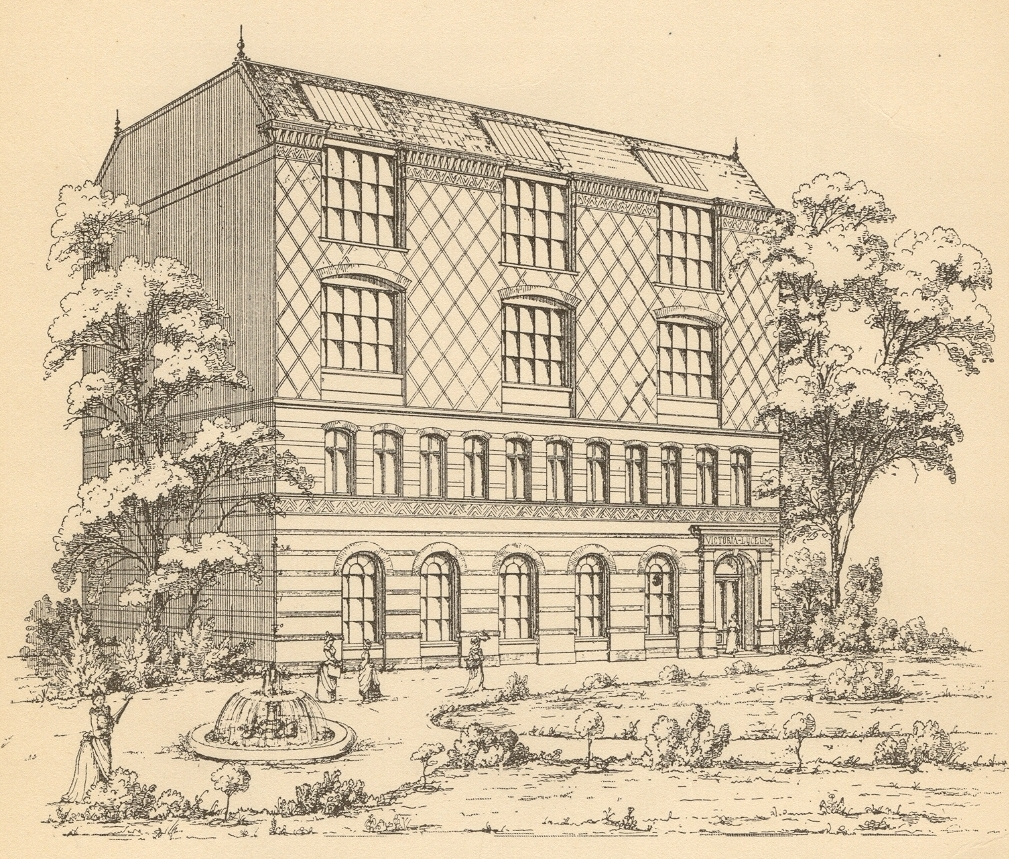
Victoria Lyceum in Berlin, 1893. Founded by Georgina Archer and continued by Alix von Cotta.

The Association of Berlin Artists emerged from the Association of Female Artists and Art Lovers in Berlin. Ever since it was founded in 1867 by Marie Remy, Clara Wilhelmine Oenicke, Rosa Petzel, and Clara Friederike Heinke, this association was geared towards the entire German-speaking area and neighboring countries. This is how Marie Wiegmann from Düsseldorf, for example, became a member of the association. In 1867 women did not have legal capacity in the German Empire, which is why it required male founding members who were bound to the association through honorary membership without being full members. The art lovers secured the association's anchoring in the bourgeoisie and, last but not least, a financial basis. Some of the art lovers also held important positions in the management of the association. For a time, Hedwig Weiß was a member of the board. The association regularly held art exhibitions.

== Art school ==
The Association of Berlin Artists and Art Friends had its own art school at Askanian Platz 7 from 1868, which from 1871 also included a “drawing and painting school” with an attached “drawing teacher seminar”. The instruction is initially provided by renowned academy professors. In 1893, the association, together with the Victoria Lyceum for higher women's education, acquired a building for the drawing and painting school at Potsdamer Straße 39 (today 98a). As the number of students increased, the club moved in 1911 to a specially built house at Schöneberger Ufer 38 (today 71).

=== Headmistresses ===
- 1871: Antonie Eichler
- 1892: Margarete Hoenerbach
- 1909: Hildegard Lehnert
- 1929: Alice Michaelis
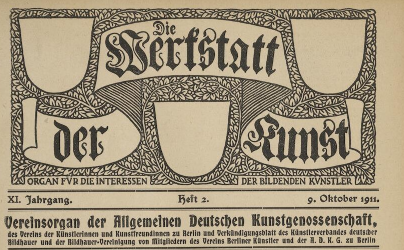
- Association body (1911)
  1933: Elisabeth von Oertzen (1887–1938), painter, graphic artist

=== Teachers ===
- Jacob Alberts
- Jeanna Bauck
- Ludwig Dettmann
- Friedrich Eggers
- Ernst Friedrich Hausmann (1856–1914)
- August Theodor Kaselowsky
- Martin Korte
- Käthe Kollwitz
- August Remy (1800–1872)
- Carl Scherres
- Karl Stauffer-Bern
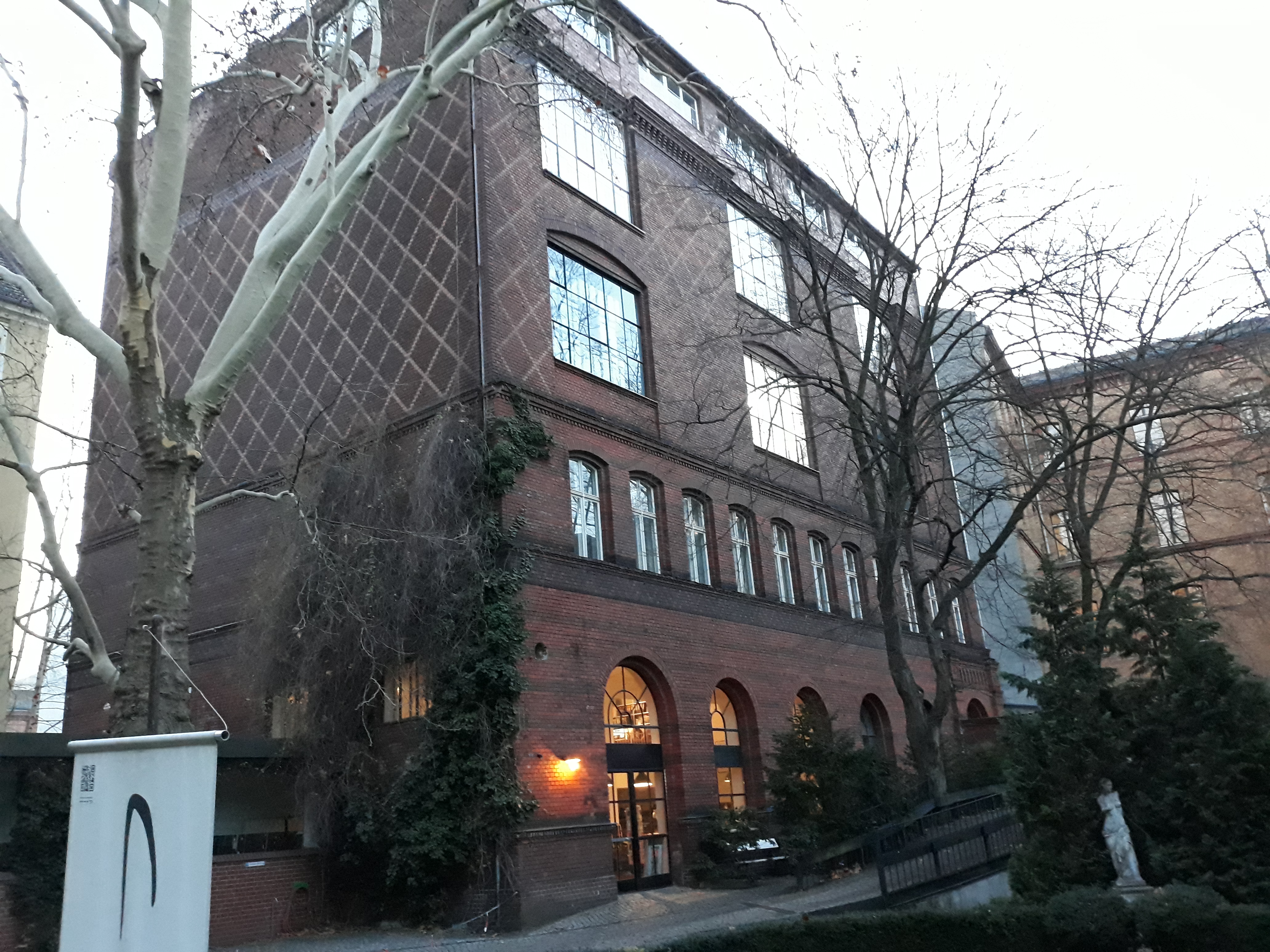
  Today's view of the former Victoria Lyceum building.
- Milly Steger
- Curt Stoeving
- Wilhelm Streckfuss
- Max Uth
- Elizabeth Voigt

=== Students ===
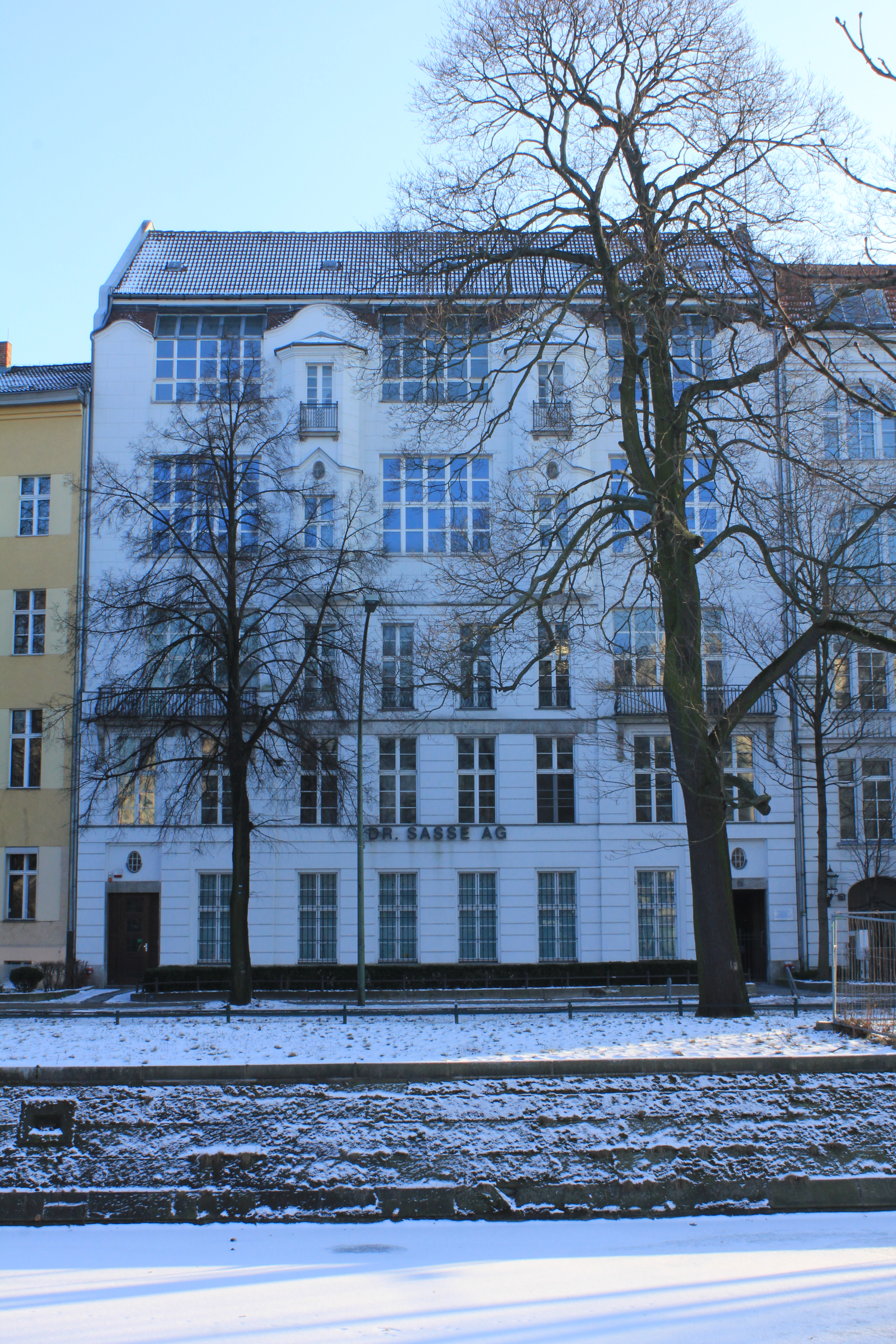
Studio building of the Association of Berlin Artists, 1910-1911

- Sophia Becker-Leber
- Mathilde Block
- Grete Csaki-Copony
- Anna Dräger-Mühlenpfordt
- Bettina Encke von Arnim
- Louise Grimm
- Ilse von Heyden-Linden
- Anna Hochstadt
- Use Jonas
- Käthe Kollwitz
- Alice Michaelis
- Paula Modersohn-Becker
- Emmy Meyer
- Elisabeth Poppe-Lüderitz
- Else Preussner
- Gertrude Sandmann
- Marie Schuetz
- Oda Schottmüller
- Louise Stomps
- Augusta von Zitzewitz
- Ruth von Minden Riefenstahl
- Catharina Klein

== Winners of the Marianne Werefkin Prize ==
- 1990: Pomona Zipser, and prizes for Angela Hampel and Sabine Kasan
- 1992: Karla Woisnitza
- 1995/1996: Katharina Meldner
- 1998/ 1999: Ulrike Bock, Brigitta Sgier
- 2001/2002: Susanne Ahner
- 2005: Heike Ruschmeyer
- 2007: Paloma Varga Weisz
- 2013: Caro Suerkemper
- 2015: Isa Melsheimer
- 2018: Stella Hamberg
- 2020: Barbara Breitenfellner

== Literature ==
- Dieter Fuhrmann (ed.): Profession without tradition. 125 Years Association of Berlin Female Artists, a research and exhibition project by the Berlinische Galerie in cooperation with the Association of Berlin Female Artists [exhibition catalog "Profession without tradition, 125 years Association of Berlin Female Artists", September 11 to November 1, 1992]. Kupfergraben, Berlin 1992, ISBN 3-89181-410-0 .
- Käthe, Paula and all the rest . A reference book (artists' dictionary). Published by the Association of Berlin Artists e. V. in cooperation with the Berlinische Galerie. Kupfergraben, Berlin 1992, ISBN 3-89181-411-9 .
- Bernd Fäthke: Securing evidence for the Blue Rider in Lithuania (= notification of the Association of Berlin Artists eV No. 6). Berlin 1995, ISBN 3-9802288-7-8 .
- Bernd Fäthke: The "Blue Rider". With Jawlensky in Ahrenshoop, Prerow and Zingst. "Blue Riders" in Munich, Murnau and Berlin (= notification of the Association of Berlin Artists eV No. 8). Berlin 1998, ISBN 3-926460-64-4 .

== Citations ==
1. ↑^{Jump up to:a b} Association of Berlin Artists 1867 e. V., Club Chronicle: Drawing & Painting School ( memento from July 17, 2015, in the Internet Archive ). In: vdbk1867.de, retrieved on August 19, 2017.
2. ↑ see also Hans-Ulrich von Oertzen; not to be confused with the writer Elisabeth von Oertzen
