= Hermine Stilke =

German illustrator and painter of the Düsseldorf school

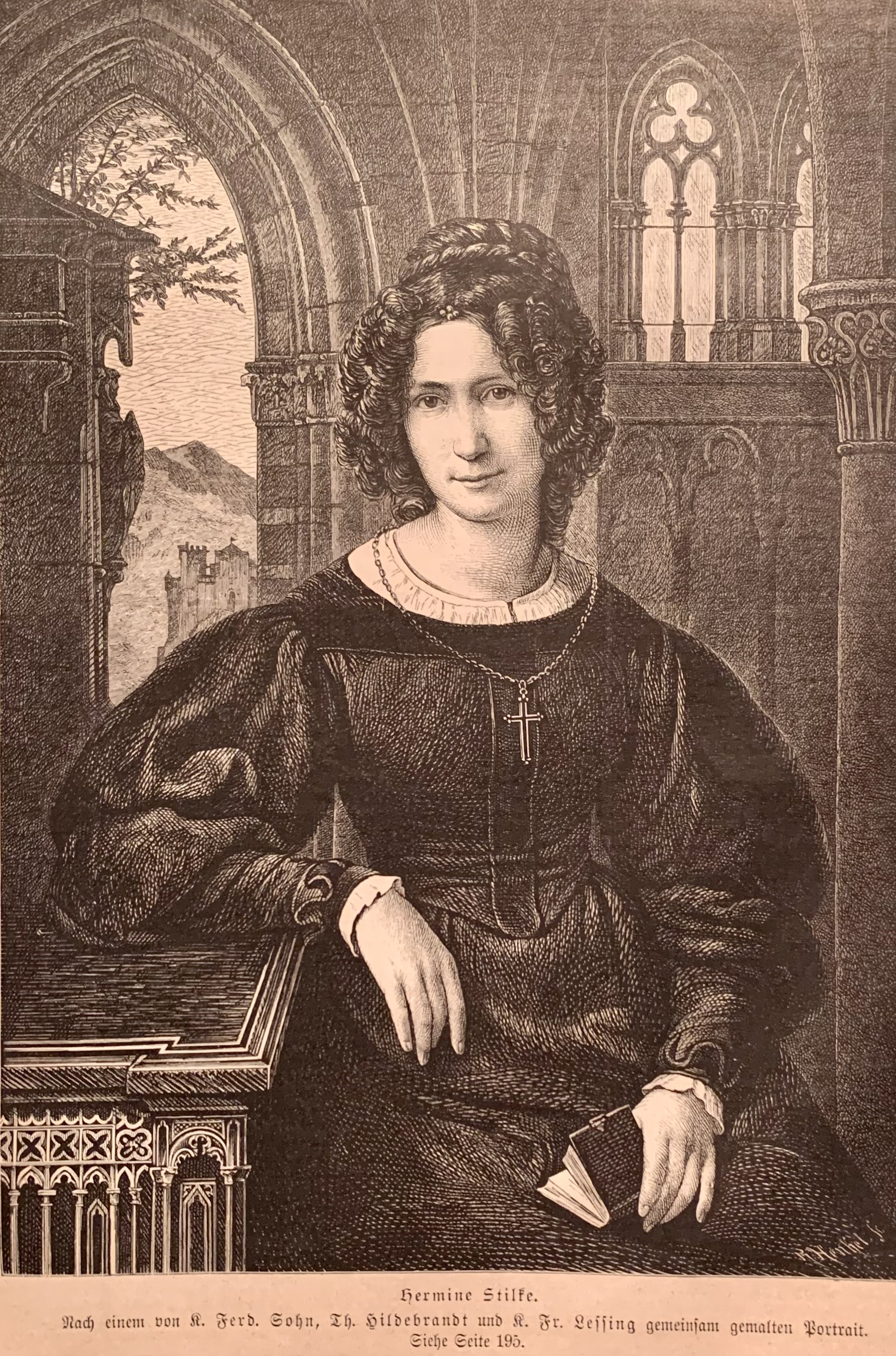
Portrait of Hermine Stilke, engraving after a portrait painted jointly by Karl Ferdinand Sohn, Theodor Hildebrandt, and Karl Friedrich Lessing

Sophia Hermine Stilke, née Sophia Hermine Peipers (3 March 1804 in Eupen – 23 May 1869 in Berlin), was a German illustrator and painter of the Düsseldorf school.

== Life ==
Sophia Hermine was the second child of Catharina Gertrudis, née Peltzer, and the dyer and knife maker Johann Peter Jacob Peipers. The couple's two sons and three daughters, who were born between 1802 and 1811, included the later landscape and vedute painter Friedrich Eugen Peipers. Hermine studied painting at the Düsseldorf Art Academy. After initially trying out history painting, she switched to painting flowers and arabesques, for which she was praised by the Blatter für literarischen entertainment in 1837 and by the art historian Georg Kaspar Nagler in 1847. On 18 January 1832 she married the history painter Hermann Stilke (1803-1860), a student of Peter von Cornelius. The couple's son was the later publisher Georg Stilke, born in 1840. She went to Berlin with her family in 1850, where she ran a private drawing school. One of her students was Marie Remy. Ernst Förster portrayed Hermine Stilke in pencil on paper in a hip portrait. The same praised her floral arabesques and border decorations in 1860 as stylish, important, and unsurpassed. In 1848, 1856, and 1860, Stilke was at the art exhibitions of the Berlin Art Academy as well as 1867 and 1870 represented at those of the Verein der Berliner Künstlerinnen. Stilke's diary was published in Leipzig around 1890.

== Works ==
In addition to watercolours, Hermine Stilke primarily created illustrations, initials, and other elements of decorative prints. Her works found their way into numerous albums, collections of poems, sayings and songs, travelogues, and luxury volumes as book decorations. They played an important role in the decorative arts of the 19th century. In many of her works, Stilke used the new medium of photography based on chromolithography. With Alwine Schroedter, wife of painter Adolf Schrödter, she is considered one of the most important German artists of the 19th century.

The following works show Stilke as an illustrator and author:

- Athanasius Graf Raczynski: History of modern German art. First volume: Düsseldorf and the Rhineland, Berlin 1836 (initials)
- Franz Grünmeyer: Prayers in the Spirit of the Catholic Church, Düsseldorf 1842 (83 illustrations reproduced in gold, silver and color printing, together with Caspar Scheuren, digitized)
- German seals with marginal drawings by German artists, Verlagshandlung Julius Buddeus, Düsseldorf 1843 (volume 1, p. 21: illustration of the Wanderlied by Joseph von Eichendorff, digital copy)
- The year in flowers and leaves with poems by Emanuel Geibel and Gustav von Putlitz, Berlin 1864 (twelve color images)
- A Journey in Pictures, Arnold'sche Buchhandlung, Leipzig 1866 (several chromo-lithographed illustrations, including Ballenstedt/Harz, Stolzenfels Castle, Heidelberg, Prague, Salzburg, Interlaken, Venice, Florence, Naples)
- The Christian festivals with poetic texts by Karl Gerok, Eduard Kauffer, Friedrich Rückert and Philipp Spitta, Arnold'sche Buchhandlung, Leipzig 1866 (seven chromolithographs)
- House Leaves. Songs and Pictures for the House, Arnold'sche Buchhandlung, Leipzig 1867 (ten chromo-lithographic plates and drawings)
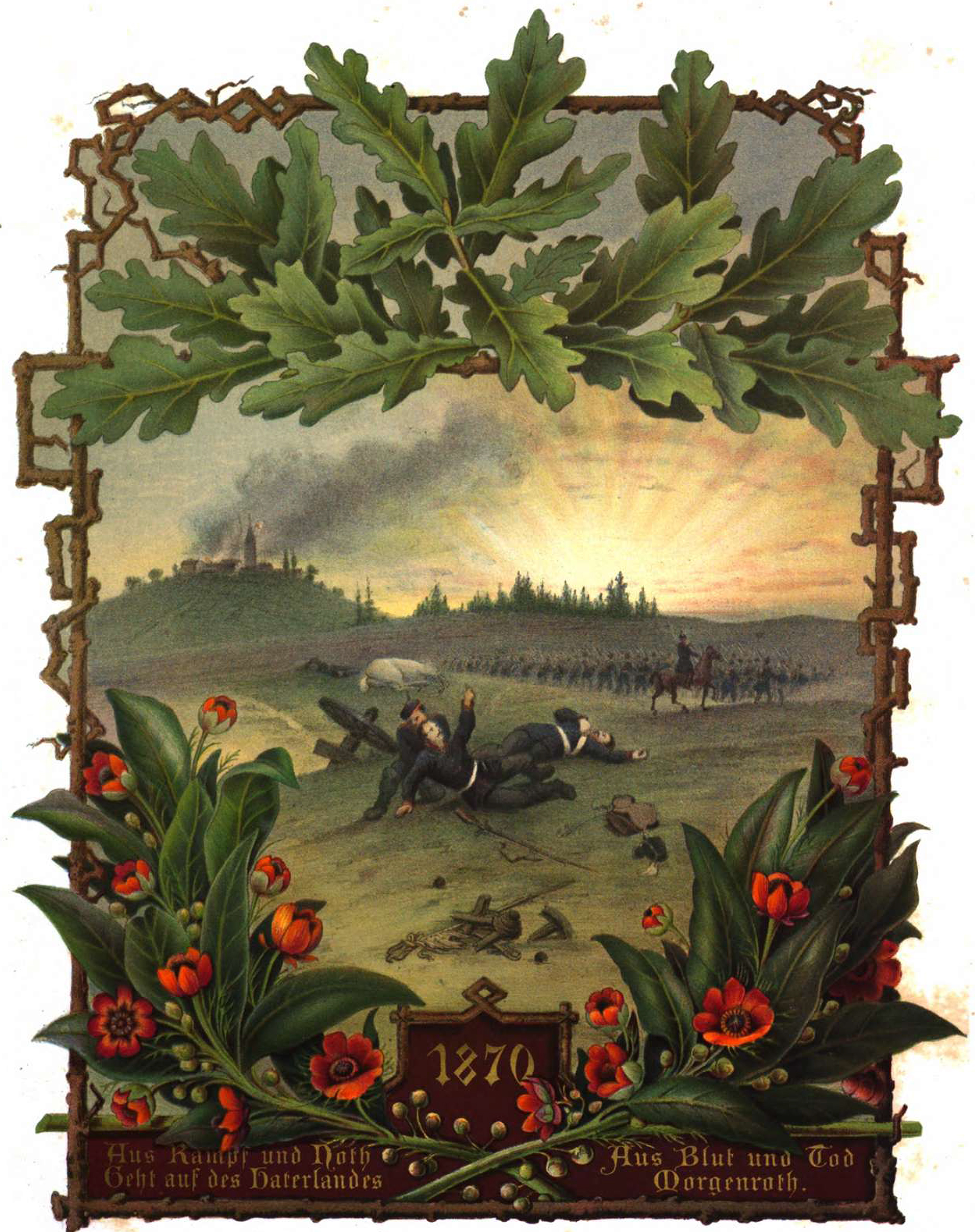
- Aus Kampf und Noth by Hermine Stilke, 1870, Deutsches Künstler-Album
  Flowers of Love, Arnold'sche Buchhandlung, Leipzig 1868 (ten lithographs/watercolor illustrations for lyrical poems)
- Immortelle from an Imperial Crypt. Poetry of the Blessed Emperor Maximilian v. Mexico, Leipzig 1868 (seven chromolithographs)
- Stilke Album, Leipzig 1869 (35 chromolithographs)
- In spring. Spring songs by various poets in original compositions for soprano by Abt, Hiller, Jensen, Küken, Reinecke, Taubert, Trottmann, Arnold'sche Buchhandlung, Leipzig 1869 (nine chromatolithographic illustrations)
- Diary (title and twelve monthly titles as chromolithographs), Leipzig around 1890

== Literature ==
- Stilke, Hermione. In: Sophie Pataky (ed.): Lexicon of German women of the pen. Volume 2. Verlag Carl Pataky, Berlin 1898, p. 334 (digital copy).
- Jochen Schmidt-Liebich: Encyclopedia of Female Artists 1700-1900. KG Saur Verlag, Munich 2005, ISBN 3-598-11694-2, p. 453 (online)

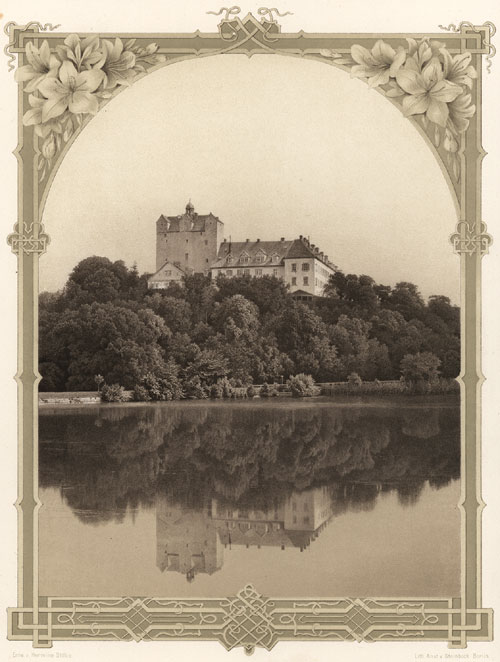
Ballenstedt Castle, lithograph
