= Rahel Szalit-Marcus =

Polish artist

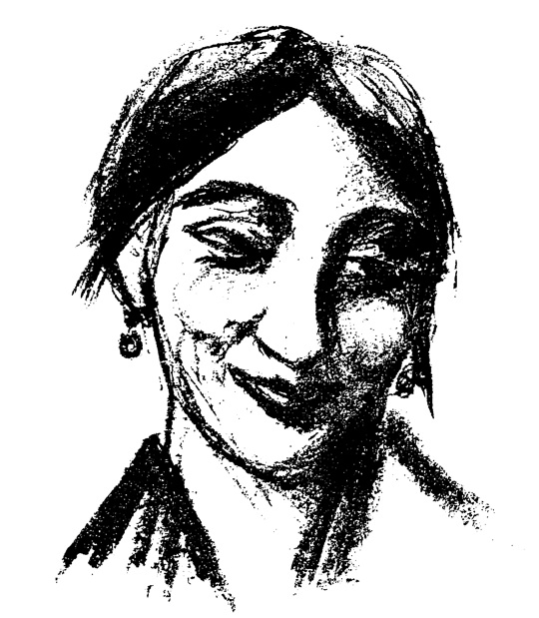
- Rahel Szalit-Marcus Self-Portrait, 1926
- Born: 2 July 1888; Telz, Russian Empire
- Died: August 1942 (aged 54); Auschwitz concentration camp, German-occupied Poland
- Other name: Rachel Szalit-Marcus
- Known for: Painting, illustrating
- Spouse: Julius Szalit

Rahel Szalit-Marcus (2 July 1888 – August 1942) was a Jewish artist and illustrator. Born Rahel Markus in Telz [Telsiai] in the Kovno region of Lithuania, then part of the Russian Empire, she was active in Berlin during the Weimar Republic and in Paris in the 1930s. She was best known for her illustrations of East European Jewish subjects. Szalit-Marcus was murdered at Auschwitz in August 1942.

== Life ==
Rahel Markus spent her later childhood years in Lodz and eventually acquired Polish citizenship. A native Yiddish speaker, she also learned Polish, German, and French. In 1911, her parents sent her to Munich to study at the Art Academy. She moved to Berlin in 1916, becoming a member of the November Group, a circle of young avantgarde artists, and befriended Jewish artists Henri Epstein and Marcel Słodski. She also studied in Paris and London. Rahel was married to actor Julius Szalit (born Julius Schalit in 1892) from 1915 until his death by suicide in 1919.

Rahel Szalit-Marcus lived in Berlin from 1916 to 1933, and from 1921 onwards she resided at Stübbenstrasse 3 in the Bavarian Quarter of Schöneberg. She went by the name Rahel Szalit beginning in the mid-1920s. Her work appeared in several exhibitions of the Berliner Secession, a German art movement that was established at the turn of the century. Szalit was acquainted with Jewish Expressionist artists Ludwig Meidner and Jakob Steinhardt, and she had the support of art historians Karl Schwarz and Rachel Wischnitzer, among others. Szalit spent time at well-known cafés frequented by artists and émigrés. She built connections to such intellectuals as Polish-German writer Eleonore Kalkowska. Szalit's lithographic images were at times compared to the work of Käthe Kollwitz.

Active in the Association of Women Artists in Berlin beginning in 1927, Szalit was able to exhibit her paintings and other work alongside such renowned artists as Käthe Kollwitz, Lotte Laserstein, Julie Wolfthorn, Käthe Münzer-Neumann, Grete Csaki-Copony, and Else Haensgen-Dingkuhn. She became better known internationally with a prizewinning painting in the 1929 exhibition Die Frau von heute.

Szalit fled to France after the Nazis came to power in Germany in 1933. She lived in Montparnasse, where she was affiliated with the School of Paris.In June 1935, she gave a solo exhibition at the Galerie Zborowski (founded by Léopold Zborowski), and remained active in Paris through 1939.

In July 1942, Szalit-Marcus was arrested in the Vel d'Hiv Roundup, and she was deported to Auschwitz in August 1942. Her Paris studio was plundered, and many of her original works were destroyed or lost.

== Work ==
Rahel Szalit-Marcus was a painter and graphic artist known for her lithographic illustrations. She created oil paintings, watercolors, and drawings (in ink, pastel, and chalk), and she began to exhibit her paintings around 1920. In the early 1920s, she illustrated books and print portfolios, most of which have survived. In the late 1920s and early 1930s, she continued to paint, and her illustrations appeared in numerous periodicals.

=== Surviving Works: Illustrated Books and Print Portfolios ===
- Fyodor Dostoyevsky, Das Krokodil, 1921
- Leo Tolstoy, Die Kreutzersonate, 1922
- Sholem Aleichem, Menshelakh un stsenes (Motl, the Cantor's Son), 1922 – portfolio
- Mendele Moykher Sforim, Fischke der Krumme, 1922 – portfolio
- Hayim Nachman Bialik, Ketina Kol-bo, 1923
- Charles Dickens, Londoner Bilder (stories from Sketches by Boz), 1923
- Heinrich Heine, Hebräische Melodien, 1923 – portfolio
- Claude Tillier, Mein Onkel Benjamin, 1927

== Gallery ==
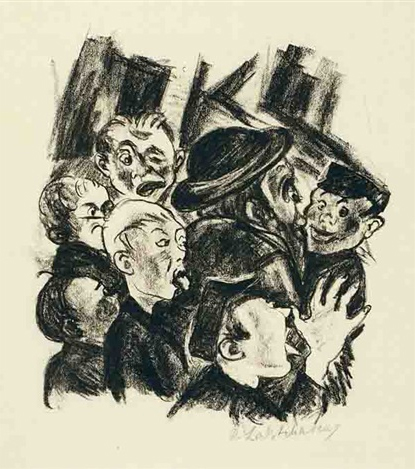
Hebrew melodies, 1923

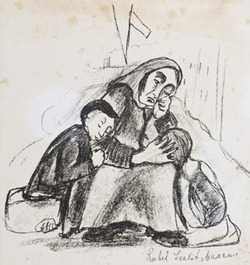
Motl the Cantor's Son, 1922

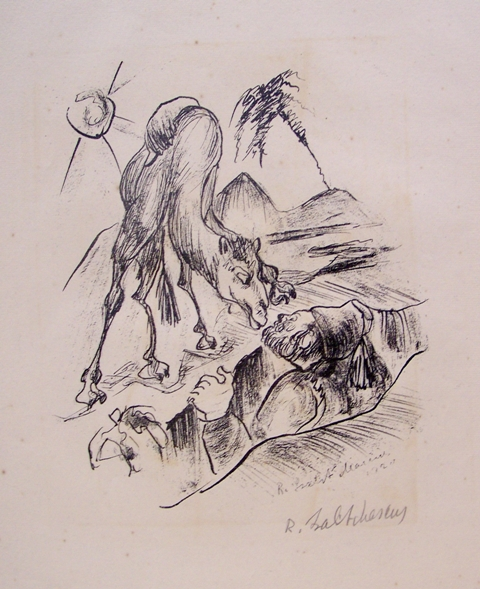
Camel in the Desert, 1926

== Literature ==
- "Szalit, Rahel." The Universal Jewish Encyclopedia, volume 10, (1943).
- "Rachel Szalit-Marcus." Jewish Virtual Library
- Hedwig Brenner, Jüdische Frauen in der bildenden Kunst. Ein biographisches Verzeichnis, Vol. 2, ed. Erhard Roy Wiehn (Konstanz: Hartung-Gorre Verlag, 2004), 331–32.
- Anna Dzabagina, “Berlin’s Left Bank? Eleonore Kalkowska in Women’s Artistic Networks of Weimar Berlin” in Polish Avant-Garde in Berlin, ed. Malgorzata Stolarksa-Fronia (Berlin: Peter Lang, 2019), 151–69.
- Hersh Fenster, Undzere farpaynikte kinstler (Paris: H. Fenster, 1951), foreword by Marc Chagall, 231-35.
- Hersh Fenster, Nos artistes martyrs (Paris: Hazan, 2021).
- Gerd Gruber, “Szalit, Rahel.” Allgemeines Künstlerlexikon. Die Bildenden Künstler aller Zeiten und Völker. Vol. 107 (Berlin: De Gruyter, 2020), 329.
- Sabine Koller, “Mentshelekh un stsenes. Rahel Szalit-Marcus illustriert Sholem Aleichem, in Leket: Yiddish Studies Today, ed. Marion Aptroot, Efrat Gal-Ed, Roland Gruschka, and Simon Neuberg (Düsselfdorf: Düsseldorf University Press, 2012), 207–31.
- Kerry Wallach, Passing Illusions: Jewish Visibility in Weimar Germany (Ann Arbor: University of Michigan Press, 2017), 48–50.
- Kerry Wallach, Traces of a Jewish Artist: The Lost Life and Work of Rahel Szalit (University Park, PA: Pennsylvania State University, 2024).
