= Wilhelm Kray =

German painter (1828–1889)

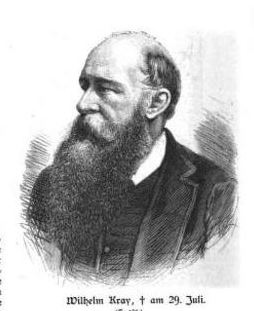
- Wilhelm Kray
- Born: 29 December 1828; Berlin, German
- Died: 29 July 1889 (aged 60)

Wilhelm Kray (29 December 1828, Berlin ; † 29 July 1889, Munich) was a German portrait, genre, and landscape painter as well as illustrator.

== Life ==
Wilhelm Kray worked as a goldsmith before 1848. From 1848 he studied at the Royal Prussian Academy of Arts in Berlin under Julius Schrader, Wilhelm Schirmer and Hermann Stilke. Between 1856 and 1872 he took part in the Berlin Academy exhibitions. In 1859/60 he was in Paris and studied in the studio of Alexandre Cabanel and Paul Baudry. He then returned to Berlin, where he worked primarily as a portraitist. Between 1867 and 1871 Kray worked in an art studio in Rome, from which he made numerous trips to Naples and Venice. Returning to Prussia around 1872, he became a member of the German Artists' Association. From 1878 he lived in Vienna and from 1879 to 1888 took part in the International Art Exhibitions in the Munich Glass Palace.

Wilhelm Kray's style is characteristic of German salon and exhibition painting of the mid to late 19th century, concentrating on romanticized themes from history, mythology, and allegory. His major works include Psyche with a Butterfly on the Lakeshore , Allegory of Winter, Southerner as an Allegory of Music, The Mermaid, The Boatman and the Mermaids, and The Myth of the Loreley, which were widely copied and reproduced during his lifetime, with Psyche being replicated on the serving dishes of the Royal Vienna China Company around 1889. Kray's public paintings still adorn the walls of the Cologne Museum and the Museum Gratz.

According to E. Benezit, Kray's painting Venus Aphrodite, created around 1880 and originally intended for King Ludwig II of Bavaria, was sold to a French collector on March 7, 1911, for 8,500 francs, a huge sum at the time. The painting, one of Kray's largest, is thematically and stylistically similar to William-Adolphe Bouguereau's Birth of Venus (1879).

== Gallery ==
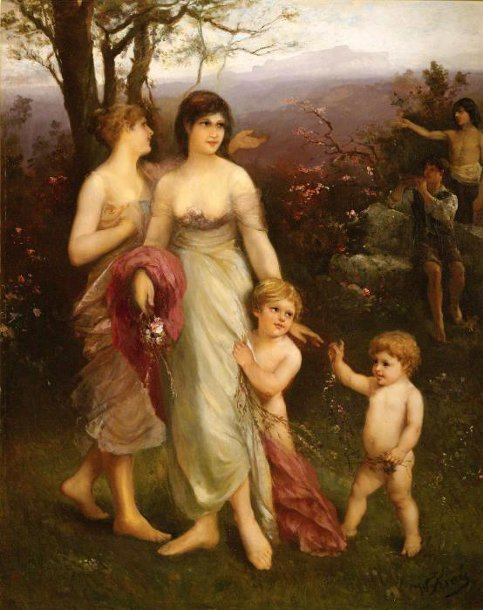
Spring, 1887

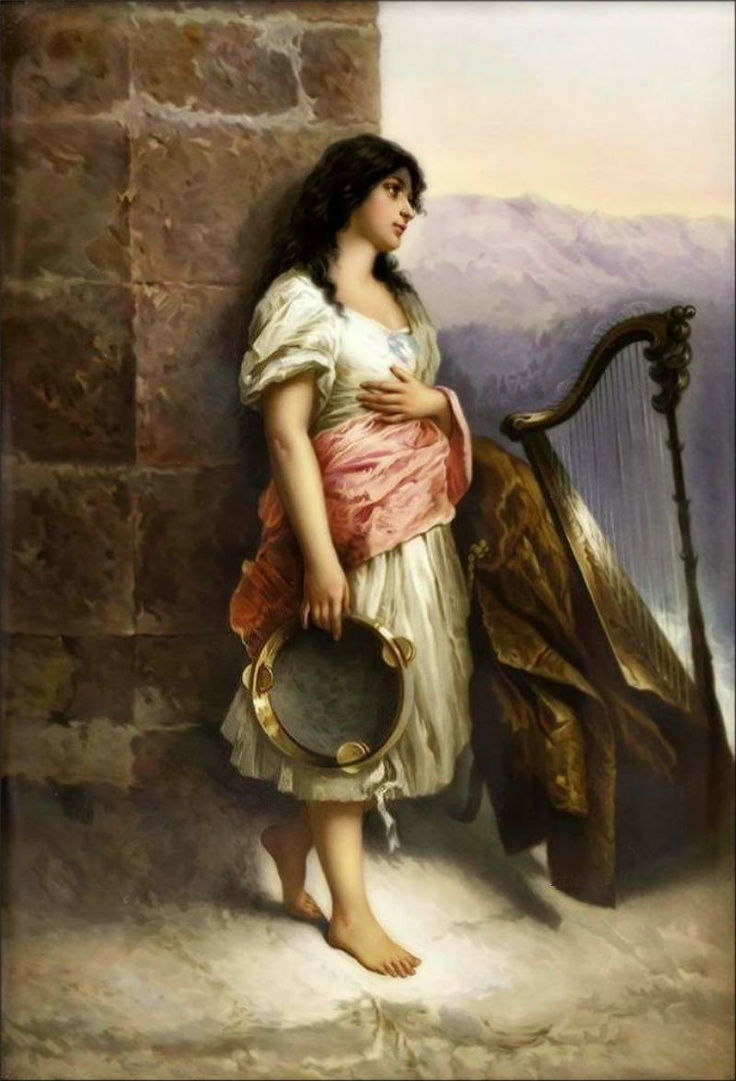
Oriental girl

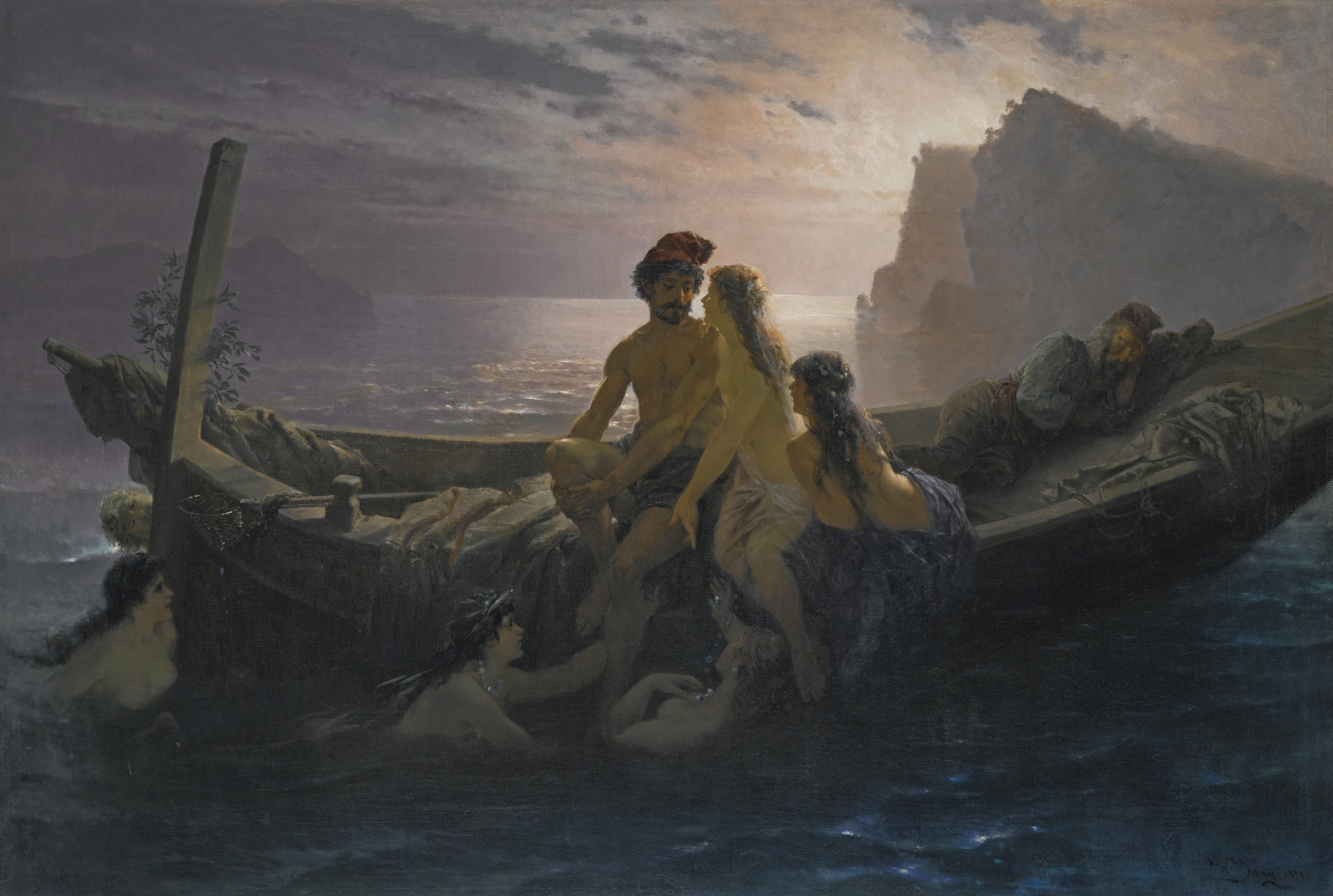
The Sirens, 1874

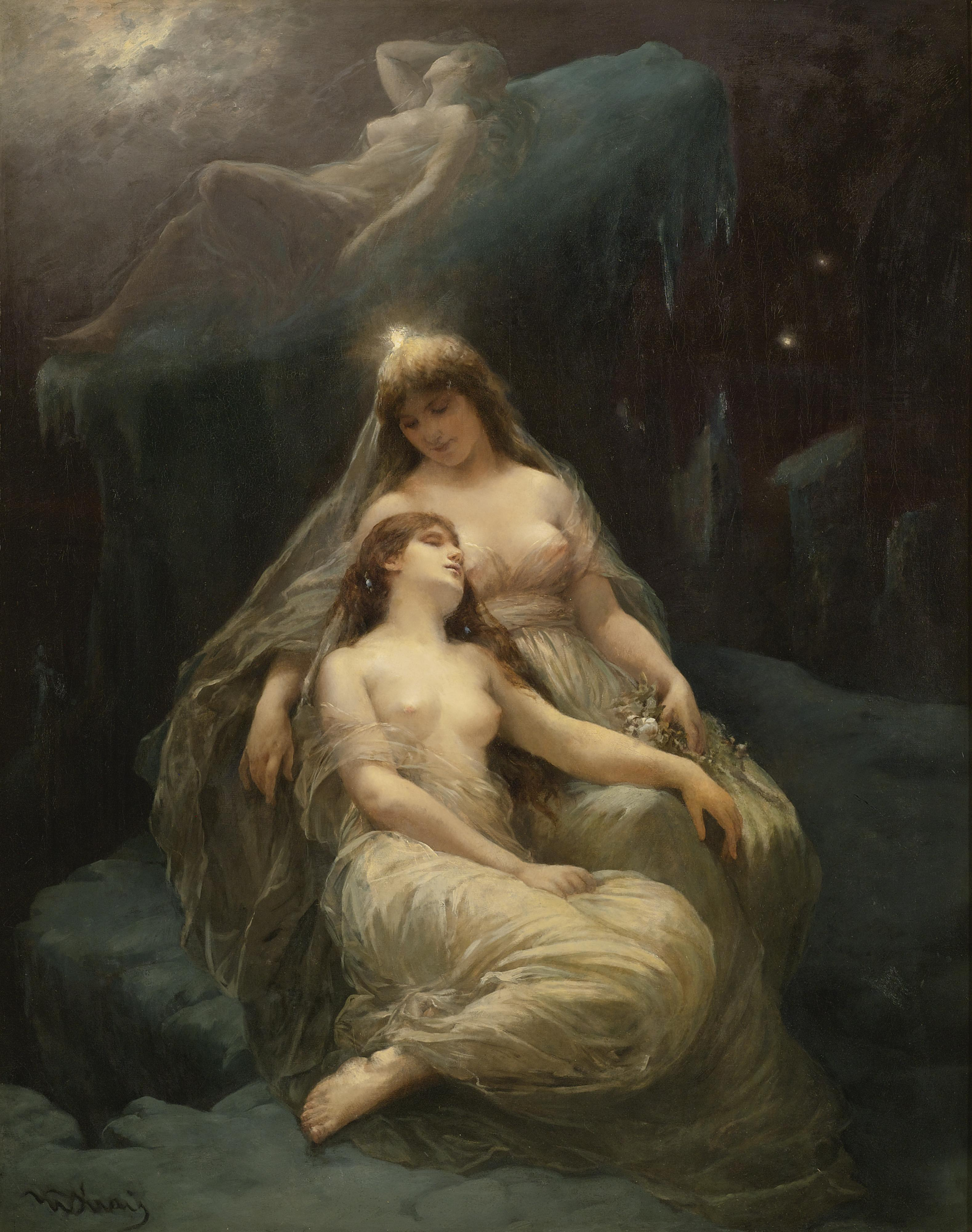
Winter

== Literature ==
- Gitta Ho: Kray, Wilhelm. In: Bénédicte Savoy, France Nerlich (Hrsg.): Pariser Lehrjahre. Ein Lexikon zur Ausbildung deutscher Maler in der französischen Hauptstadt. Band 2: 1844–1870. de Gruyter, Berlin/Boston 2015, ISBN 978-3-11-031477-9, S. ?.
- Dupont Vicars: Master Paintings of the World. The White City Art Co. Press, Chicago, 1902. pp. 1–19
