= Alice Michaelis =

German painter (1875–1943)

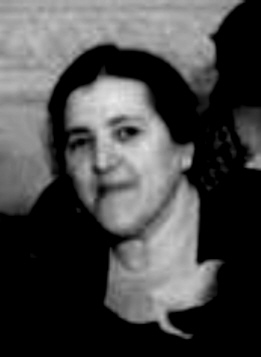
- Born: Alice Sara Priester; 5 April 1875; Berlin, German Empire
- Died: 23 June 1943 (aged 68); Theresienstadt Ghetto, Terezín, Protectorate of Bohemia and Moravia
- Occupation(s): Painter, teacher
- Spouse: Louis Michaelis (m. 1899–1942; his death)

Alice Michaelis (née Alice Sara Priester; 5 April 1875 – 23 June 1943) was a German Jewish painter and educator. She was known for paintings of still lifes, interiors, and landscapes. Michaelis was a Holocaust victim.

== Early life and education ==
Alice Sara Priester was born on 5 April 1875 in Berlin, German Empire (now Germany), to Jewish parents Flora (née Eyck), and merchant Moritz Priester.

She studied art at the Berlin painting schools of Max Uth, Hans Baluschek, Lovis Corinth, and classes the Association of Berlin Women Artists.

On 15 October 1899, she married banker Louis Israel Michaelis. They lived in the Schöneberg quarter of Berlin at Speyerer Straße 2.

== Career and late life ==
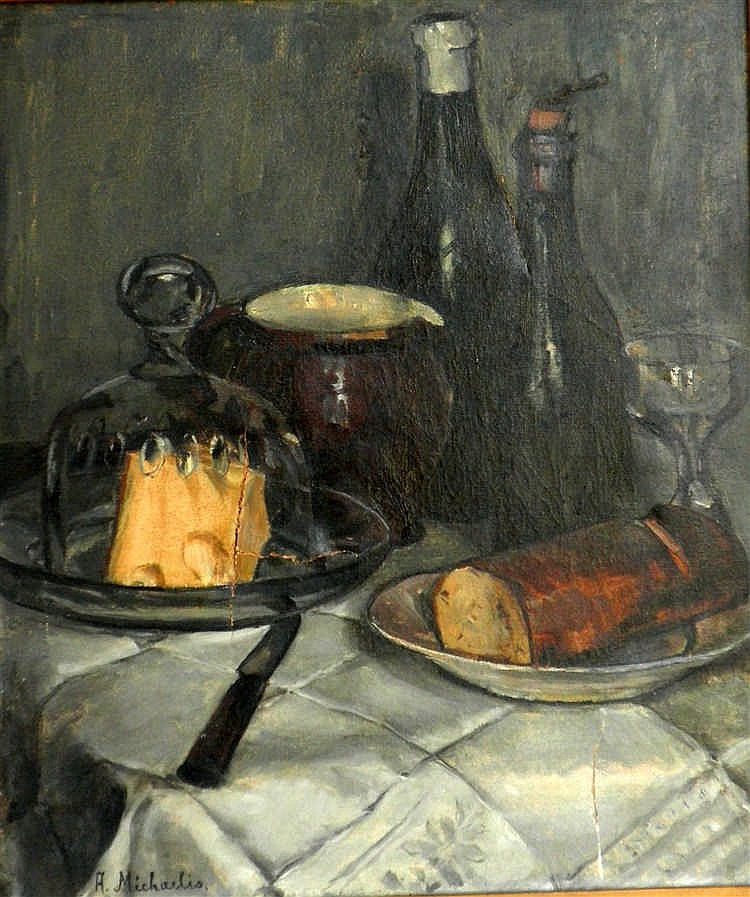
Still life by Michaelis, date unknown

Michaelis was an active member of the Association of Women Artists of Berlin, from 1911 to 1934 and held leadership positions. Michaelis was also a member of the General German Art Association, the Reich Association of Fine Artists in Germany, and Munich Artists' Association.

=== Death ===
On 3 October 1942 during the Holocaust, she was transported to Theresienstadt Ghetto in Terezín in Protectorate of Bohemia and Moravia (German-occupied Czechoslovakia; now Czech Republic). Michaelis was murdered on 23 June 1943, at the age of 68, at the Theresienstadt Ghetto.

Her husband Louis was also murdered, some six months prior to her at the Theresienstadt Ghetto. Several other members of the Association of Berlin Women Artists were murdered during The Holocaust, including Julie Wolfthorn.
