= Clara Lobedan =

German painter

- Born: 8 August 1840; Naumburg, Kingdom of Prussia
- Died: 1918 (aged 77–78); Berlin, Germany
- Known for: Painting, ceramics

Clara Augusta Amalie Emma Lobedan (1840–1918) was a German painter, watercolorist, pastelist, ceramicist, and craftsman.

== Biography ==
Lobedan was born on 8 August 1840 in Naumburg, Germany.

She studied painting under Theude Grønland and Karl Gussow in Berlin. Lobedan exhibited her work at the Woman's Building at the 1893 World's Columbian Exposition in Chicago, Illinois. She is thought to have established an art school for women in Berlin. She is known to have taught Hildegard Lehnert.

Lobedan died in 1918 in Berlin.

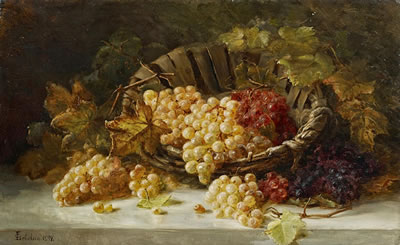
Stilleben mit Weintrauben by Clara Lobedan, nd
