= Marie Remy =

German flower and still life painter

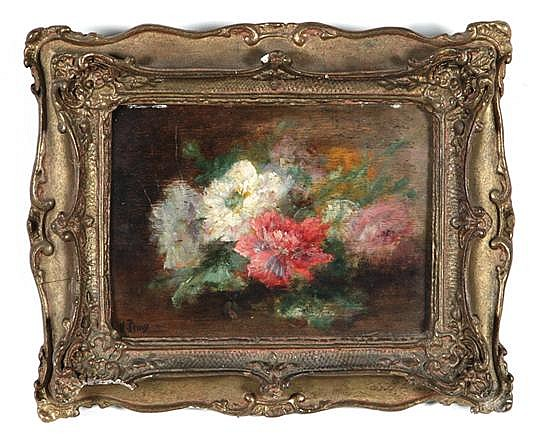
One of Remy's paintings

Karoline Pauline Marie Remy (21 November 1829 in Berlin – 26 February 1915) was a German flower and still life painter.

== Life and work ==
Remy was the daughter of the history and portrait painter August Remy (1800–1872) and Ernestine, née Hermann. Works by her and her father could be seen in 1866 in the 45th art exhibition at the Royal Academy of Arts in Berlin.

Remy was taught to draw by her father and further trained by Hermine Stilke and the flower and still life painter Theude Grönland. After completing her education, she traveled to England, Paris, Switzerland, Tyrol, and Italy.

In 1867, together with Clara Oenicke, Rosa Petzel, and Clara Heinke, she founded the Verein der Berliner Künstlerinnen. The National Gallery in Berlin owns some of her works.

Remy taught botanical drawing at the Victoria Lyceum founded by Georgiana Archer and wrote a number of illustrated books and coloring pages.

She died on 26 February 1915 at Landgrafenstraße 7 in the Schöneberger Vorstadt.

== Works (Prints) ==
- Elise Polko: Nursery. Collection of quotes and poems about mothers, children and upbringing. With a title page painted in color by Marie Remy. Frohberg, Leipzig 1872.
- Do you know the country Italian flowers and fruits. Painted in gouache from nature. 5 deliveries. Breidenbach & Co., Düsseldorf 1875.
- Marie Remy, Elise Polko: Flowers on the way of life. Baumann, Dusseldorf 1879.
- Eight flower frames for business card sized pictures. New templates for flower painting. Leipzig 1881.
- Pantography edition of the floral templates on a black background. Winckelmann & Sons, Berlin 1881.
- Flower greetings. Small album leaves printed in colour, painted in gouache from nature. Winckelmann & Söhne, Berlin 1889. (Edition with verses by German poets.)

== Literature ==
- Remy, Marie. In: Hermann Alexander Müller: Biographical artist encyclopedia. The best-known contemporaries in the field of fine arts from all countries with details of their works. Bibliographic Institute, Leipzig 1882, p. 435 (retrobibliothek.de).
- Christian Gottlob Kayser: In: tape 22: 1877-1882, L-Z. Weigel, Leipzig 1883, p. 381 (Text archive – Internet Archive).
- In: Arvid Ahnfelt (ed.): Oskar L. Lamms Forlag, Stockholm 1887, p. 475 (Swedish, runeberg.org).
- Remy, Marie. In: Friedrich von Boetticher: Painting works of the 19th century. contribution to art history. Volume 2/1, sheets 1-32: Mayer, Ludwig-Rybkowski. Mrs. v. Boetticher's Verlag, Dresden 1898, p. 384 (text archive - Internet Archive).
- Remy, Marie. In: Sophie Pataky (ed.): Lexicon of German women of the pen. Volume 2. Verlag Carl Pataky, Berlin 1898, p. 183 (digital copy).
- Karoline Müller (ed.): Victoria of Prussia 1840-1901 in Berlin 2001 (notification of the Association of Berlin Artists 15). Association of Berlin Artists 1867 eV, Berlin 2001, ISBN 3-9802288-9-4, p. 340.
- Jochen Schmidt-Liebich: Encyclopedia of Female Artists 1700-1900. Germany, Austria, Switzerland. Saur, Munich 2005, ISBN 3-598-11694-2, pp. 385–386.
