= Clara Oenicke =

German history, portrait, and genre painter

Clara Wilhelmine Oenicke (29 July 1818 in Berlin – 9 August 1899 in Berlin) was a German history, portrait, and genre painter.

== Life ==
Clara Oenicke was born on 29 July 1818 in Berlin and baptized on 16 August 1818 in St. Nicholas Church, Berlin. She was the daughter of Johanna Caroline, née Spaenhauer, and Gustav Adolph Oenicke, and had two older siblings, sister Wilhelmine Amalie Oenicke (*1804) and brother Louis Theodor Oenicke (1814–1815), who died early.

Oenicke was a student of Marie Remy in 1837, then employed by Carl Joseph Begas and later in the studio of Eduard Magnus. From 1840 she worked independently, and in 1848 she also offered drawing and painting lessons for women in her apartment at Bernburger Straße 18. In 1867, together with Marie Remy, Rosa Petzel, and Clara Heinke, she founded the Verein der Berliner Künstlerinnen. In 1870 she was listed in the Berlin address book as a portrait and history painter and lived at Dessauer Strasse 7 pt.

Clara Oenicke died on 9 August 1899 after a long and difficult illness. Her last apartment was at Kurfürstenstraße 163.

== Works ==
Paintings (selection)

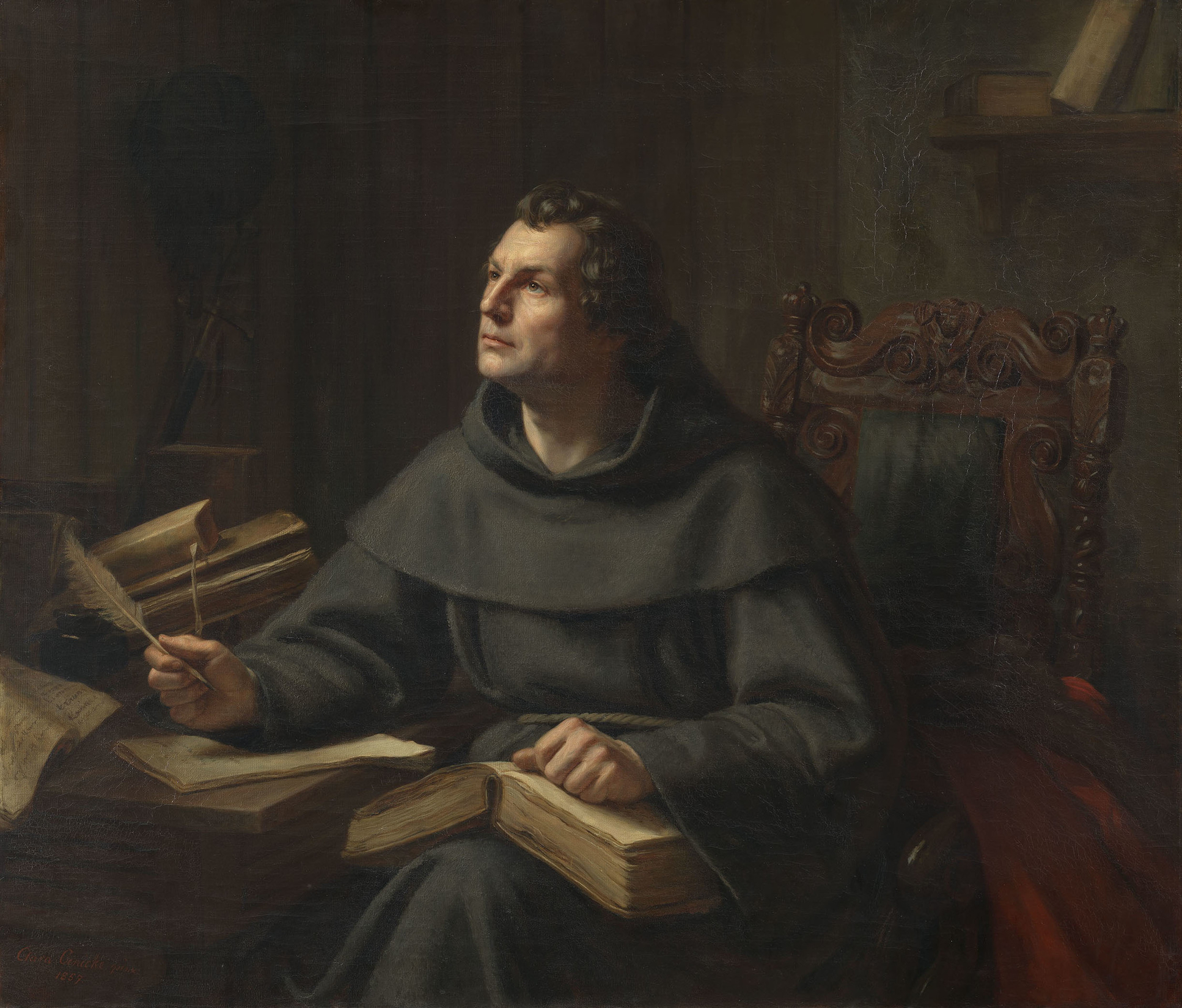
Martin Luther, 1857, by Clara Wilhelmine Oenicke, Royal Collection

- Hiker resting under an old oak tree in a mountain landscape (1845)
- Frederick the Great and the Page (1846)
- A Wanderer by Evening Illumination (1846)
- Margaret of Anjou (1846)
- Self-Portrait (1852)
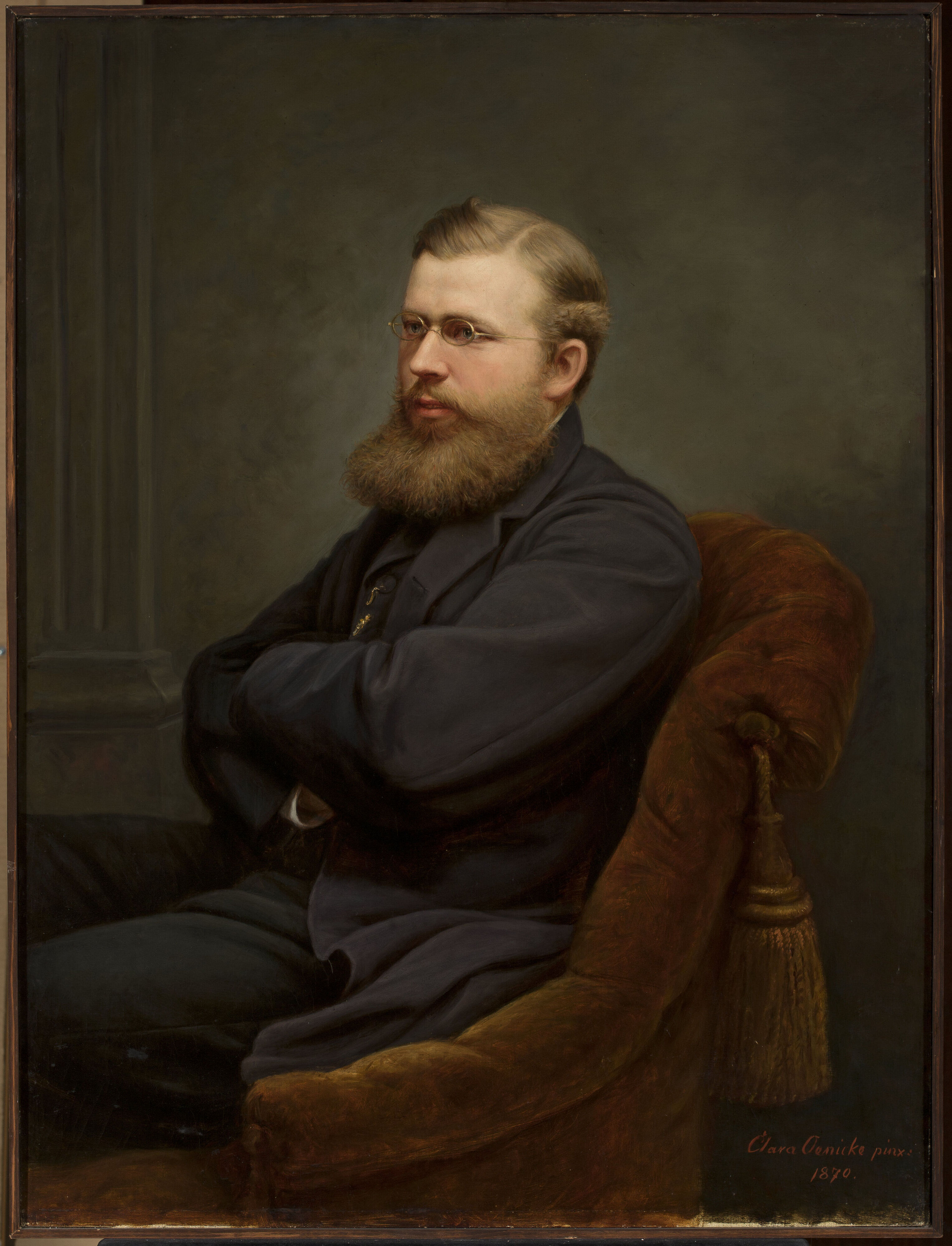
- Portrait of a Man, 1870
  Johann Friedrich the Magnanimous refuses to sign the imperial interim (1854)
- Charles I of England bids farewell to his family (1856)
- Luther's home devotions (1862)
- The Elector Johann Friedrich the Great of Saxony (1862)
- Luther finds the first Latin Bible. (1866)
- Portrait of Superintendent Büchsel (1866)
- Portrait of Premier Lieutenant von Notz who died near Königgrätz (1866)
- Leibniz presents his plan for founding the Academy of Sciences to Queen Sophie Charlotte . (1868)
- Five life-size portraits in a uniform oval format, commissioned by Albrecht von Stosch (1868):
  - Albrecht von Stosch (today: German private collection)
  - Max von Stosch
  - Gustav Peterson (today: Federal Audit Office Potsdam)
  - Therese Peterson, b. Stosch (today: Federal Audit Office Potsdam)
  - Louise Peterson (married to Hans Hübner ) (today: German private collection)
- Portrait of Major Franz von Notz (1870)
- Portrait of Mrs. Privy Councilor Dr. by Graefe (1871)
- Portrait of Lieutenant Curt von Quast (1872)
- It is finished (1879 altarpiece in the church of Wöbbelin )
- Portrait of the manor owner Hermann von Quast (1879)
- Portrait of a Boy (1880)
- Portrait of Medical Councilor JHC Krappe

Exhibitions (selection)

- Berlin art exhibition 1846
- Berlin art exhibition 1854
- Picture gallery in Bellevue Palace, 1856.
- 41st Art Exhibition of the Royal Academy of Arts, Berlin, 1858
- 43rd Art Exhibition in Berlin, 1862
- XLV. Art exhibition of the Royal Academy of Arts, Berlin, 1866
- XLVI. Art exhibition of the Royal Academy of Arts, Berlin, 1868
- 47th art exhibition in Berlin 1870
- Academic art exhibition Berlin 1871
- 6th Annual Exhibition of the Association of Female Artists and Art Lovers, 1878
- 8th exhibition of the Association of Female Artists and Art Lovers, 1878

== Literature ==
- Julius Schrader : Frederick the Great after the Battle of Kollin. In: Gustav Freytag, Julian Schmidt (eds.): The border messengers . Magazine for politics, literature and art. 8th year II semester. IV Volume. Leipzig 1840, p. 119 f. ( books.google.de ).
- Önicke, Clara Wilhelmine. In: Hermann Alexander Müller : Biographical artist encyclopedia. The best-known contemporaries in the field of fine arts from all countries with details of their works. Bibliographic Institute, Leipzig 1882, p. 400 ( retrobibliothek.de ).
- Franz Vallentin (art historian): Oenicke, Clara Wilhelmine . In: General German Biography (ADB). Volume 52, Duncker & Humblot, Leipzig 1906, p. 704.
- . In: Hans Vollmer (ed.): Founded by Ulrich Thieme and Felix Becker . tape 25 : Moehring–Olivié . EA Seemann, Leipzig 1931, p. 569 .
- Oenicke, Clara. In: General artist encyclopedia. Life and work of the most famous visual artists. Assisted by Hermann Alexander Muller. Edited by Hans Wolfgang Singer . 3rd volume. 3. reworked and supplementary edition. Literary publishing house Rütten & Loening, Frankfurt am Main 1898, p. 330 ( text archive – Internet Archive ).
- Irmgard Wirth : Berlin painting in the 19th century. From the time of Frederick the Great to the First World War. Siedler, Berlin 1990, ISBN 3-88680-260-4, p. 161 ff.
- Dieter Fuhrmann (ed.): Profession without tradition. 125 Years Association of Berlin Female Artists, a research and exhibition project by the Berlinische Galerie in cooperation with the Association of Berlin Female Artists [exhibition catalog "Profession without tradition, 125 years Association of Berlin Female Artists", September 11 to November 1, 1992], Berlin : Kupfergraben, 1992, ISBN 3-89181-410-0
- Paul Pfisterer, Claire Pfisterer: . Walter de Gruyter, Berlin/New York 1999, ISBN 3-11-014937-0, p. 497 ( books.google.de – reading sample, signature example Clara Oenicke ).
- Karoline Müller (ed.): Victoria of Prussia 1840-1901 in Berlin 2001 (= notification of the Association of Berlin Female Artists eV Volume 15). Association of Berlin Female Artists, Berlin 2001, ISBN 3-9802288-9-4, p. 385.
