= Hildegard Lehnert =

German painter

- Born: 1857; Berlin, Kingdom of Prussia
- Died: 1943 (aged 85–86)
- Known for: Painting

Hildegard Lehnert (1857–1943) was a German painter.

== Biography ==
Lehnert was born in 1857 in Berlin, Kingdom of Prussia. She studied painting under Clara Lobedan and Karl Gussow at the Berlin Academy. She continued her studies in Paris with Edmond Yon. Lehnert exhibited her work at the Woman's Building at the 1893 World's Columbian Exposition in Chicago, Illinois.

Lehnert died in 1943.

== Gallery ==
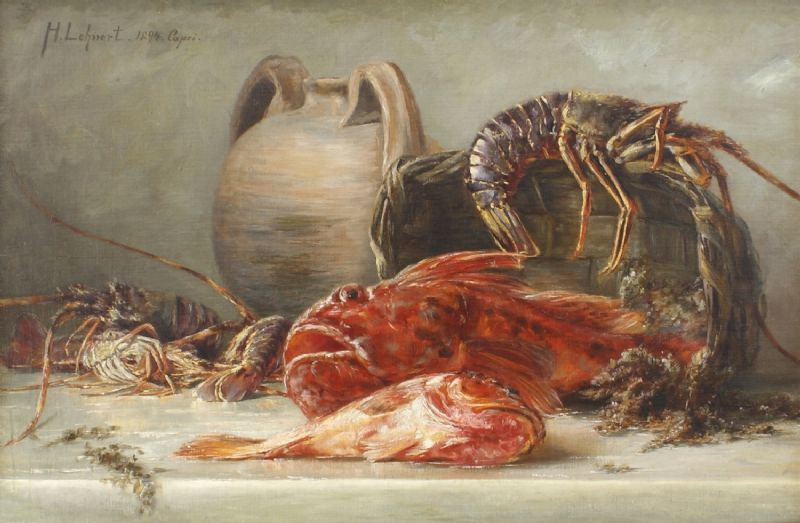
untitled, nd

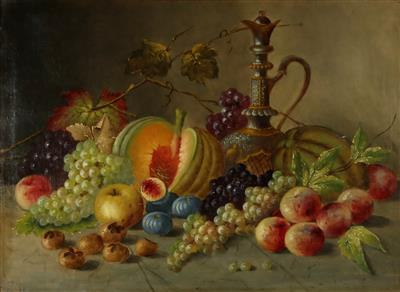
Obststillleben mit Krug, c. 1900

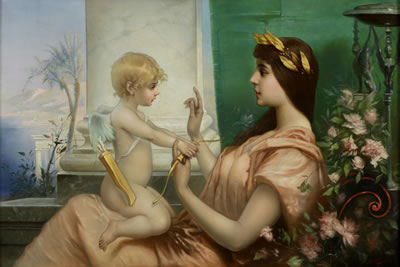
Lecture to Cupid, nd
