= Hermann Stilke =

German painter

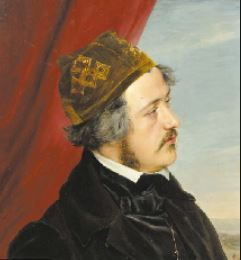
Self-portrait (date unknown)

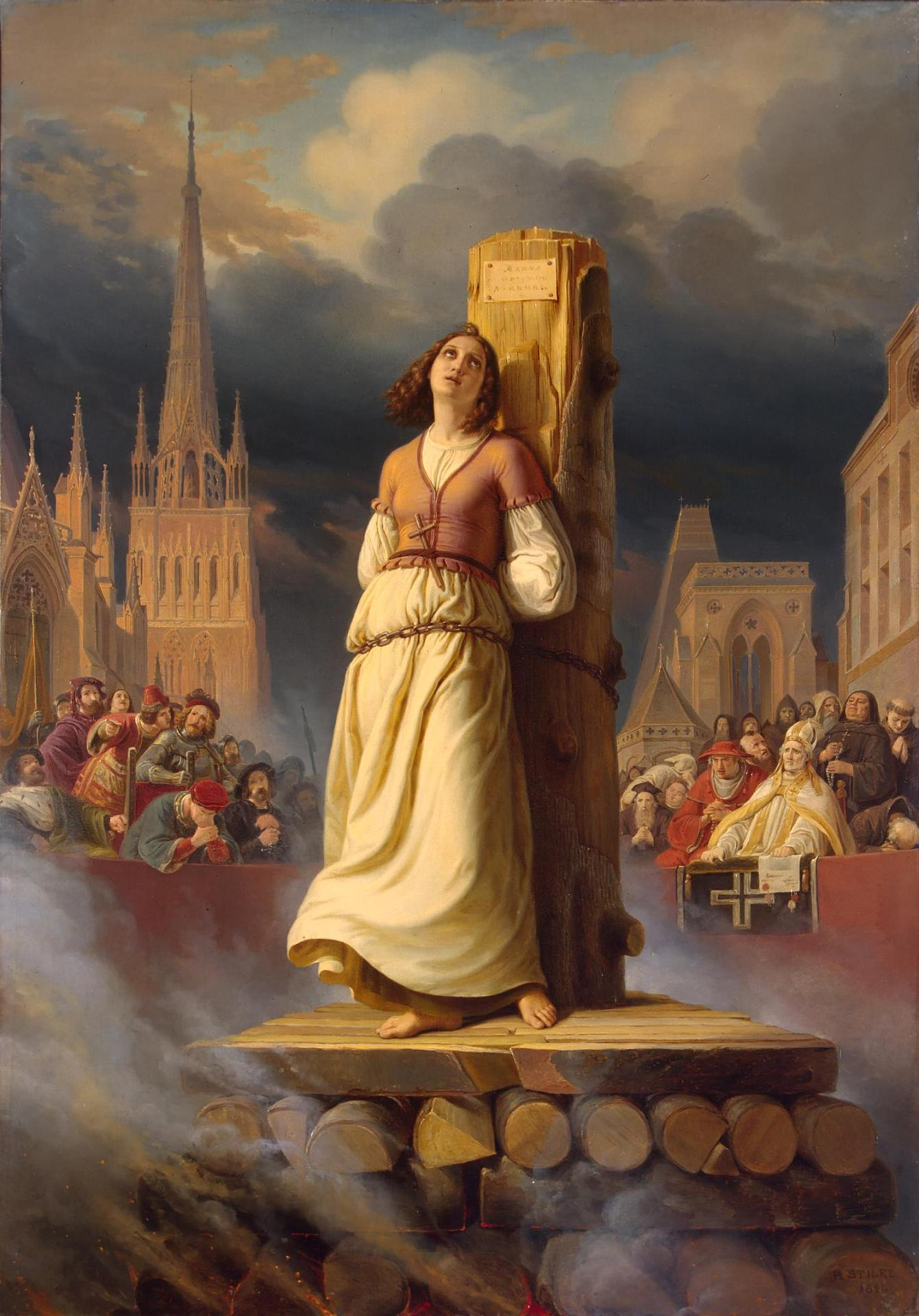
Joan of Arc's Death at the Stake

Anton Hermann Stilke (29 January 1803, Berlin - 22 September 1860, Berlin) was a German painter; associated with the Düsseldorfer Malerschule. He is best known for his scenes from the life of Joan of Arc.

== Life and work ==
He had originally intended to devote himself to agriculture, but was attracted to art instead and began his studies at the Berlin Academy with Carl Wilhelm Kolbe. His first exhibition was held there in 1820. The following year, he transferred to the Kunstakademie Düsseldorf, where he studied with Peter von Cornelius. He also worked as an assistant to Karl Stürmer, who was painting a "Last Judgment" at the tax court in Koblenz. It was left unfinished due to lack of resources. He later alternated between Düsseldorf and Munich, where he decorated the arcade at the Munich Hofgarten with several frescoes.

In 1827, he went to Northern Italy, then to Rome, until 1833 when illness forced him to go home. After a brief stay in Berlin, he returned to Düsseldorf and continued his studies with Friedrich Wilhelm von Schadow at the Kunstakademie and worked as a teaching assistant. During that time, he also received a commission to decorate the Great Hall at Stolzenfels Castle; creating murals of the "Six Knightly Virtues"; a project he completed in 1846. He went back to Berlin in 1850, and was named a professor at the academy in 1854. He had been a member there since 1835.

He died in 1860, at the age of fifty-seven, and was interred at the St.-Matthäus-Kirchhof. His grave has not been preserved.

One of the pupils he met at the Kunstakademie, Hermine Peipers, became his wife in 1835 and was known for her watercolors. Their son, Georg, was a bookseller and publisher.
