= Catharina Klein =

German painter

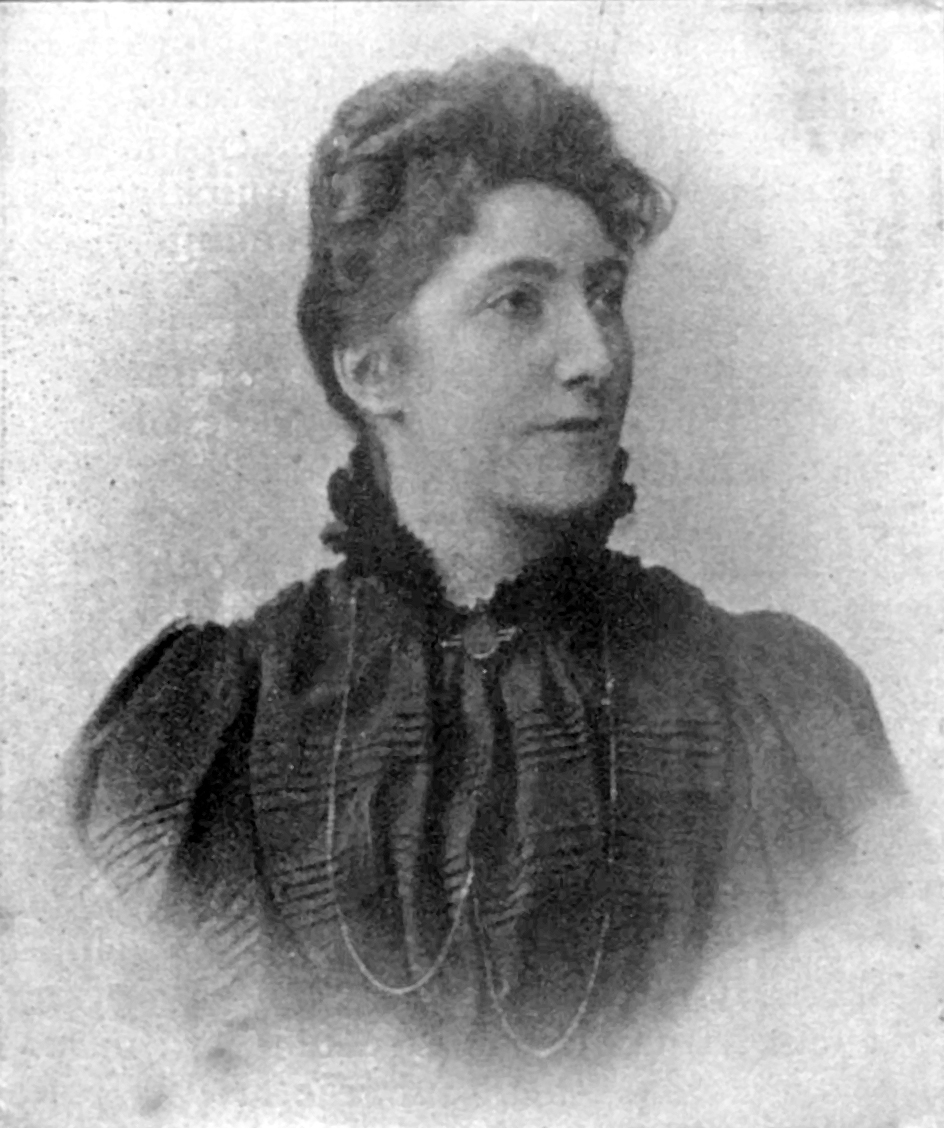
Catharina Klein

Catharina Antonie Klein (4 November 1861 - 30 November 1929), mistakenly known as Catherine Klein, was a German painter. Her naturalistic flower and fruit still lifes were extremely popular in the late 19th and early 20th century. They became famous worldwide as multi-colour lithographic prints in books, on postcards, but also in botanical publications. Since then, Klein has been considered an important representative of flower painting.

== Life and works ==
Catharina Antonie Klein was born on 4 November 1861 in Karlshöfchen (now in Bagrationovsky District) near the East Prussian town of Preußisch Eylau. Her talent for drawing was already acknowledged at school. After her father moved the family to Berlin-Charlottenburg, she attended the Ladies' Academy in Berlin, which was run by Verein der Berliner Künstlerinnen und Kunstfreundinnen. Up until the German Revolution of 1918–1919, women were generally excluded from the Berlin University of the Arts and therefore had to switch to private schools. There, Klein specialized in painting flowers – exclusively with watercolour and gouache paints, because oil techniques seemed her "too heavy" for the delicate flowers.

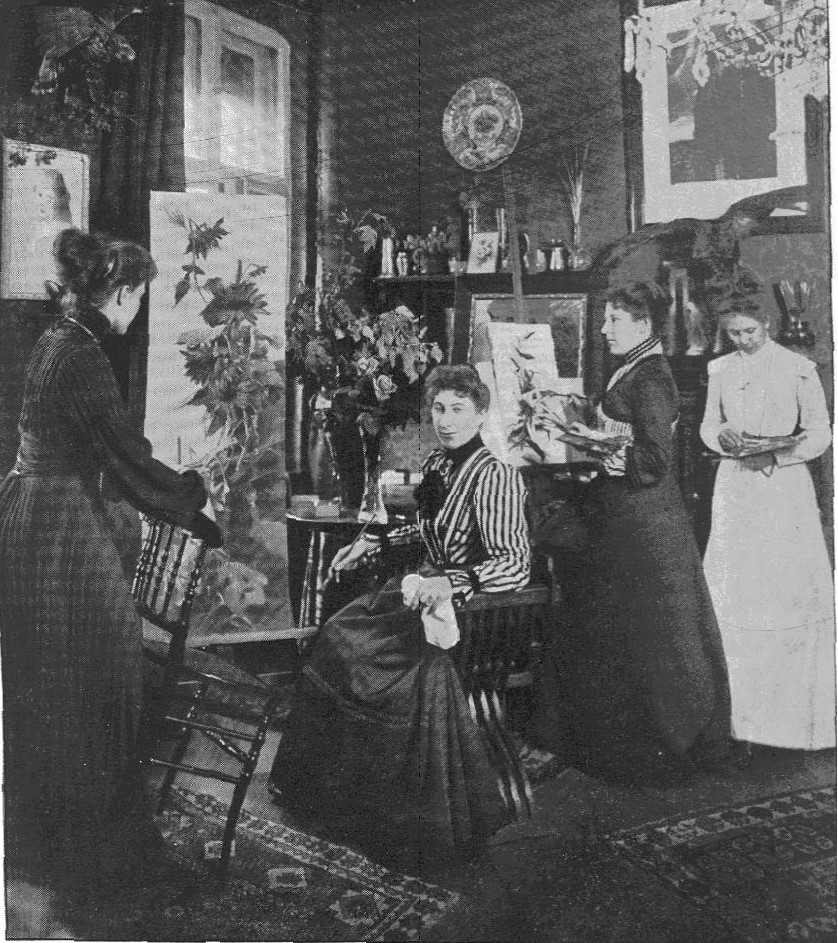
Seated Klein with students in her studio, probably 1902

From 1890 on her pictures were shown in exhibitions, especially in Berlin, Dresden and Munich; she also took part in the 1893 World's Fair in Chicago. The works quickly became popular and Klein soon belonged to the circle of the most popular still life painters. Her works were then represented in well-known art collections and the royal palaces of Berlin, and the German Emperor Wilhelm II also bought paintings by the artist. At about the same time, Klein ran a much-visited student studio. The participants from all over the world included, for example, Maria Marc, Maria Strakosch-Giesler, the Baltic German Hildegard von Haken and the American Teana McLennan Hinman.

After the turn of the century, Klein almost exclusively accepted commissioned work from publishers such as Meissner & Buch from Leipzig and Raphael Tuck & Sons from London. They had already published their earlier works in larger editions using multi-colour lithography, the leading reproduction method at this time. Postcards were among the most popular printed products. But flower books and play quartets also found buyers. In addition to the printing of her works, which Klein herself tirelessly promoted, a large number of unauthorized copies appeared. These forgeries were often alienated by additional embellishments and thereby lost their artistic value.

In addition to the popular depictions of flowers, Klein has also illustrated publications for the botanical world in the 1890s. These included, for example, the two-volume overview work Vilmorin's Blumengärtnerei, the Rosen-Zeitung, the French Journal des Roses and the journal of the German Dendrological Society. There was also a major contribution to Parey's Blumengärtnerei, a standard work of horticultural literature at the time, which she was unable to complete. She died on November 30, 1929, at the age of 68 in Berlin-Charlottenburg. Her remains were removed from her grave in 1953 as she was not considered a sufficiently significant artist by the cultural authorities.

Klein's artistic output consisted of more than two thousand paintings. Klein painted birds, butterflies, fruit, mushrooms, and table settings. She also created works to celebrate Christmas and Easter. However, she devoted most of her work to wild and garden flowers with a vast number of roses. The Victorian-Wilhelminian era produced hundreds of new varieties. Above all, the hybrid tea roses with their lush flower shape and countless colour variations held a special fascination. In line with this, the painter used heavy, tinted paper. The background of the picture was usually designed with watercolours, the actual motif was created by applying water-soluble top paints. Klein added chinese white to the latter to increase the colour brilliance, but also to simplify later lithographic reproductions. Much of Klein's work was lost during World War II.

Postcards and art prints
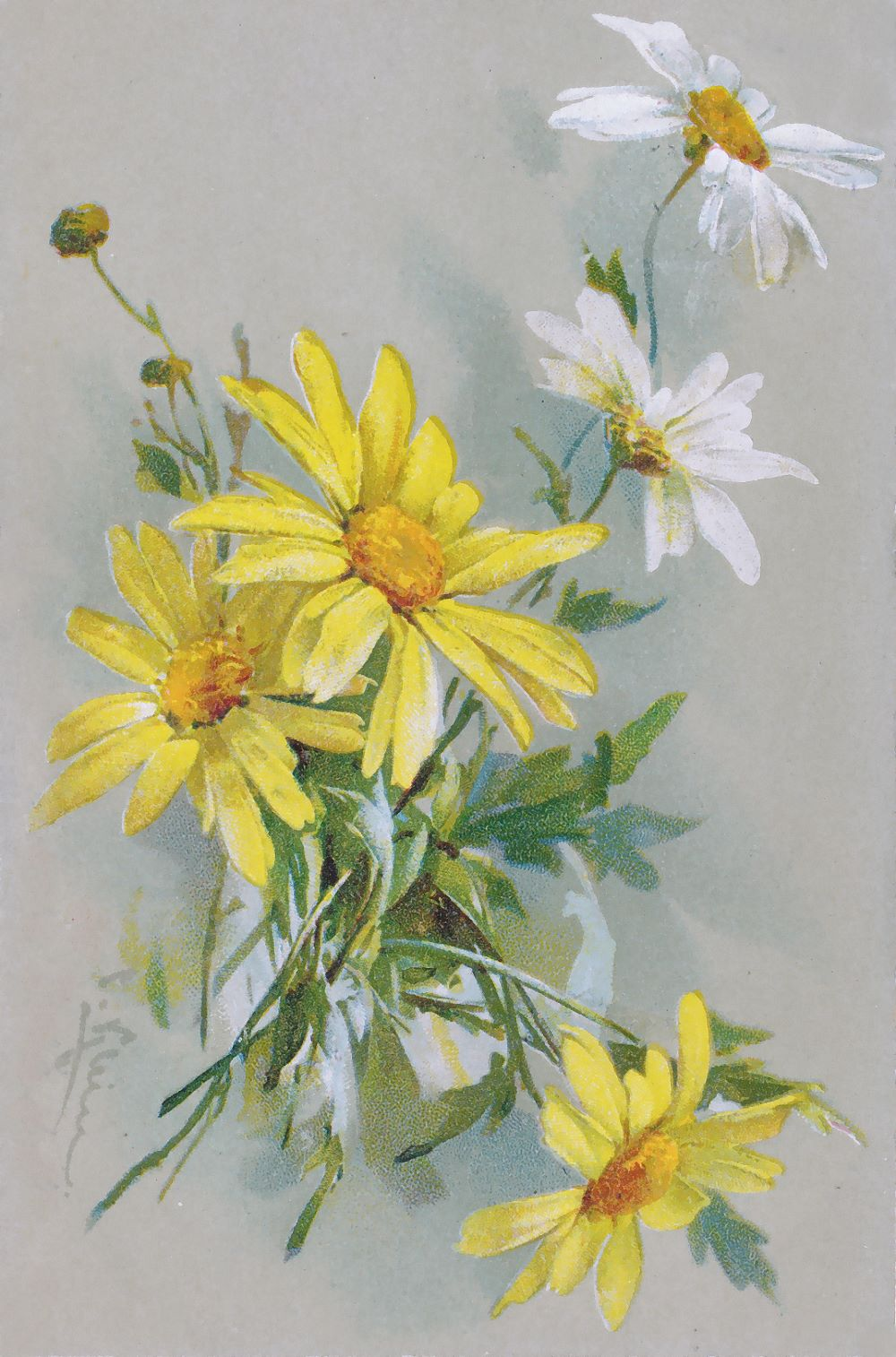

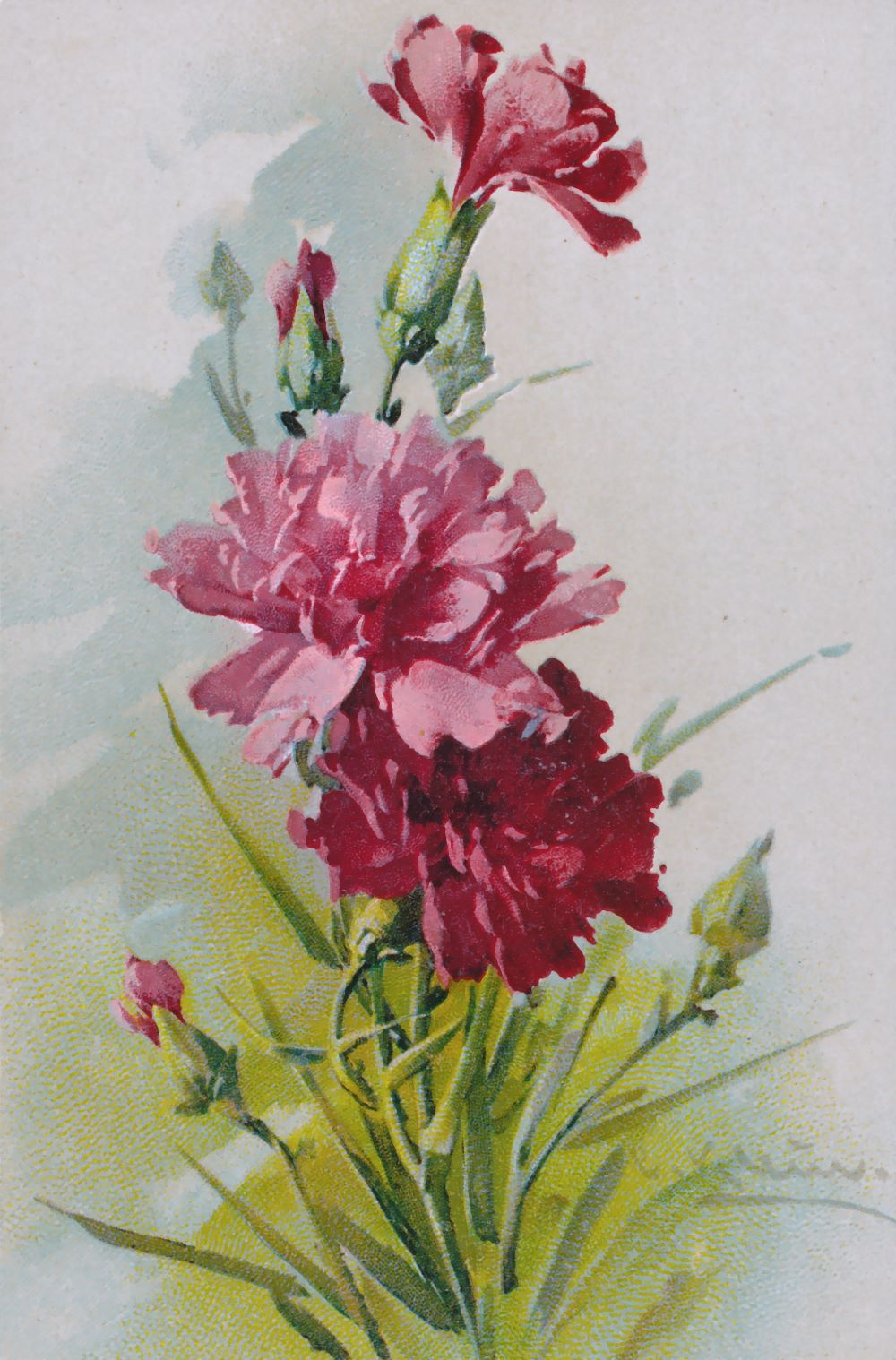

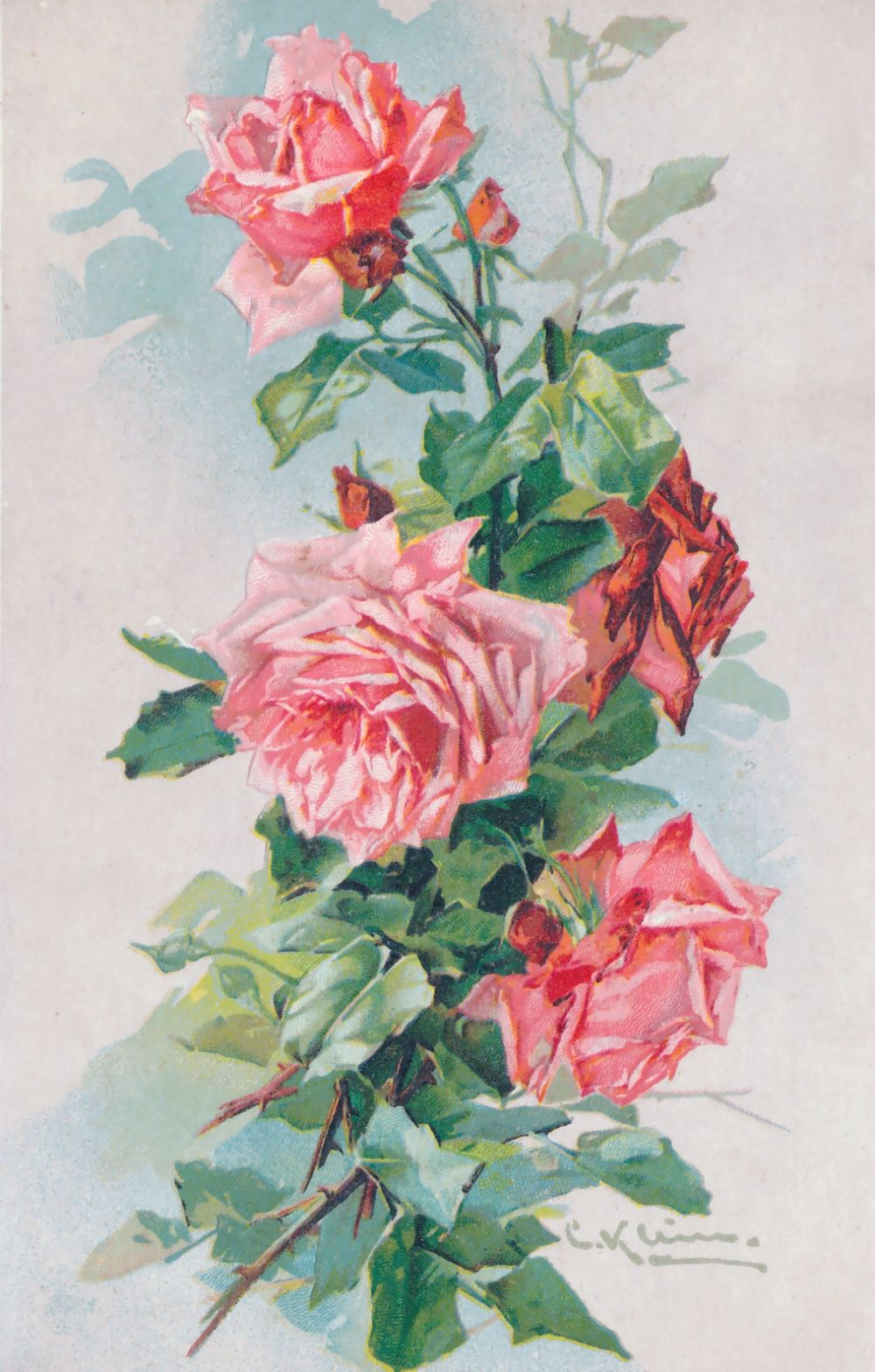

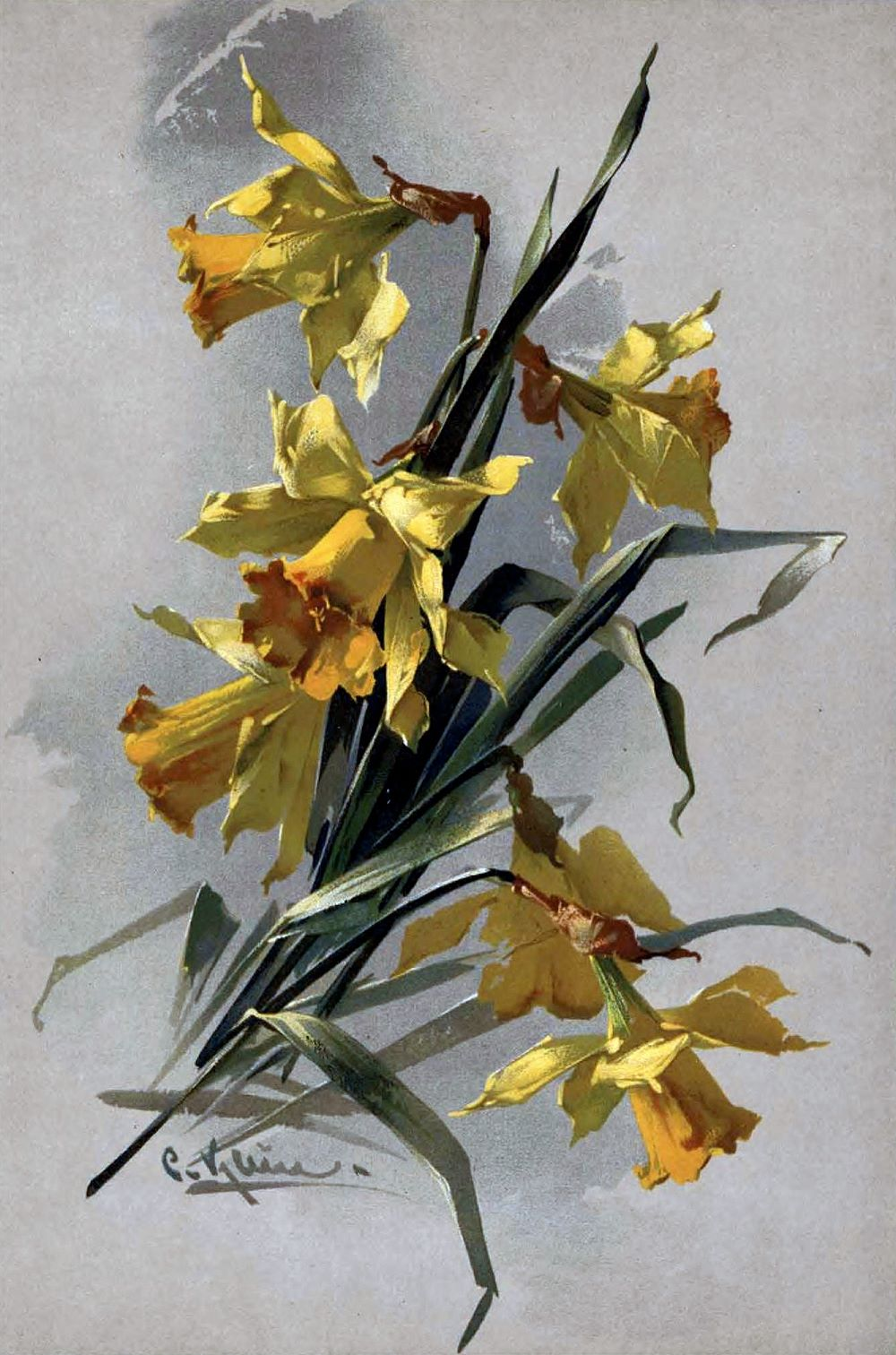
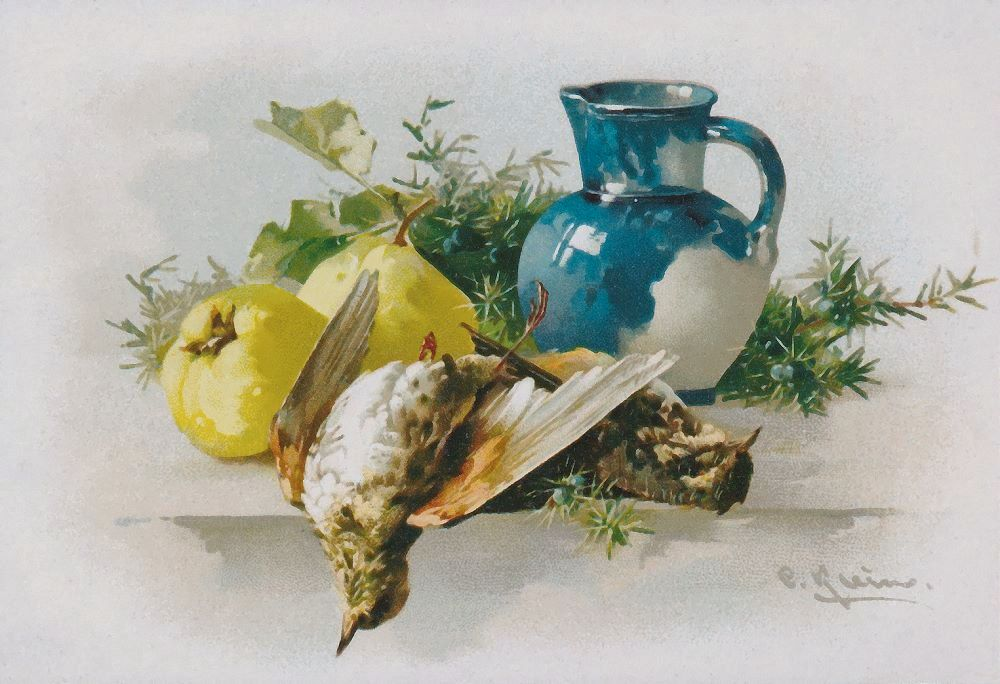

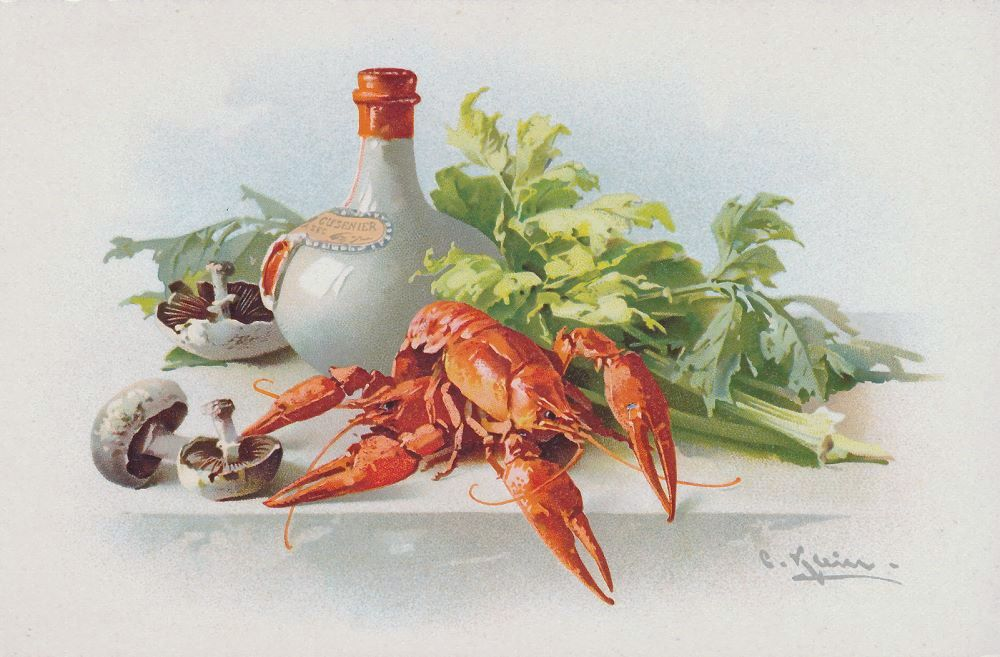
Botanical illustrations (taken from Vilmorin’s Blumengärtnerei )
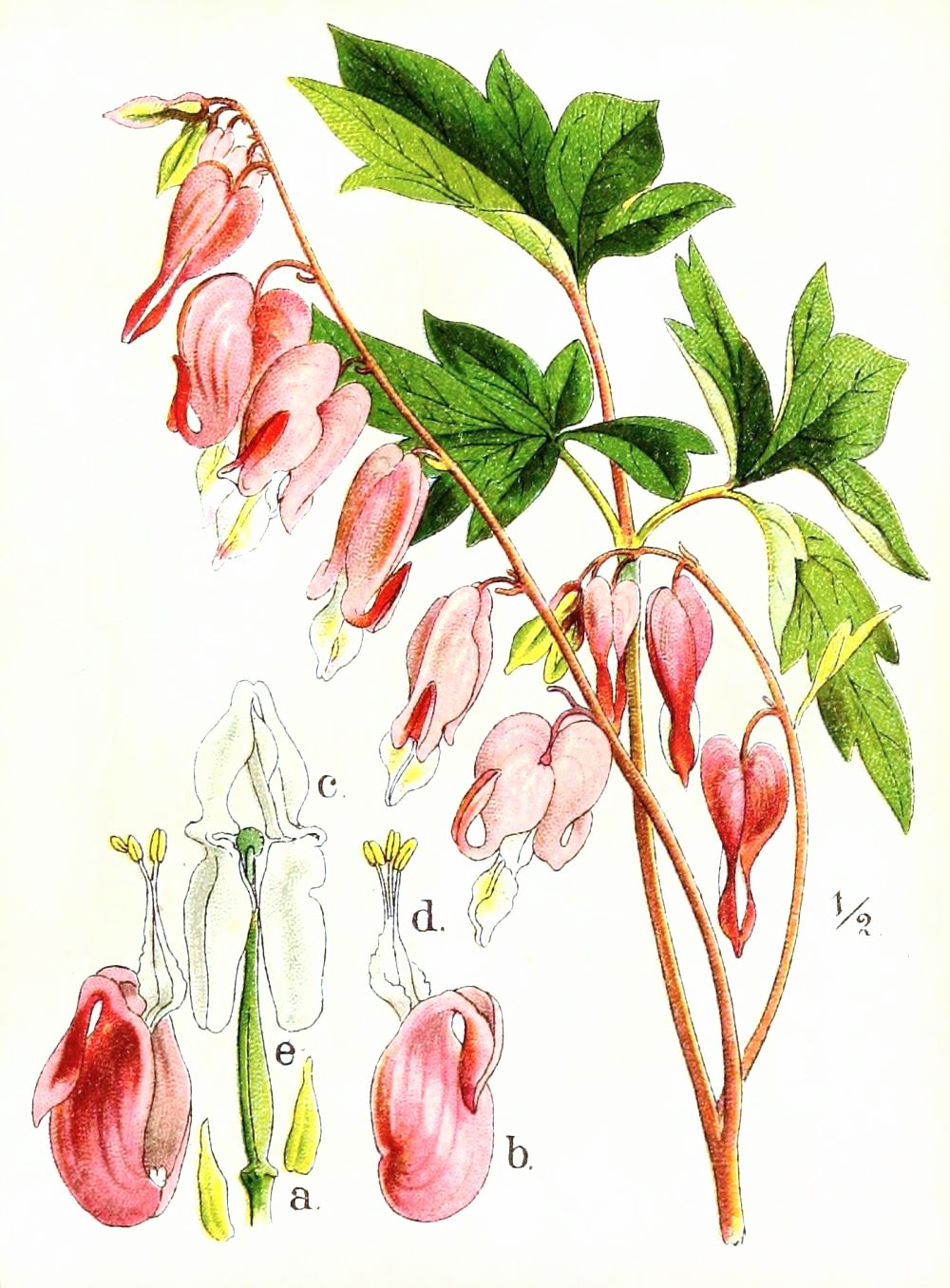

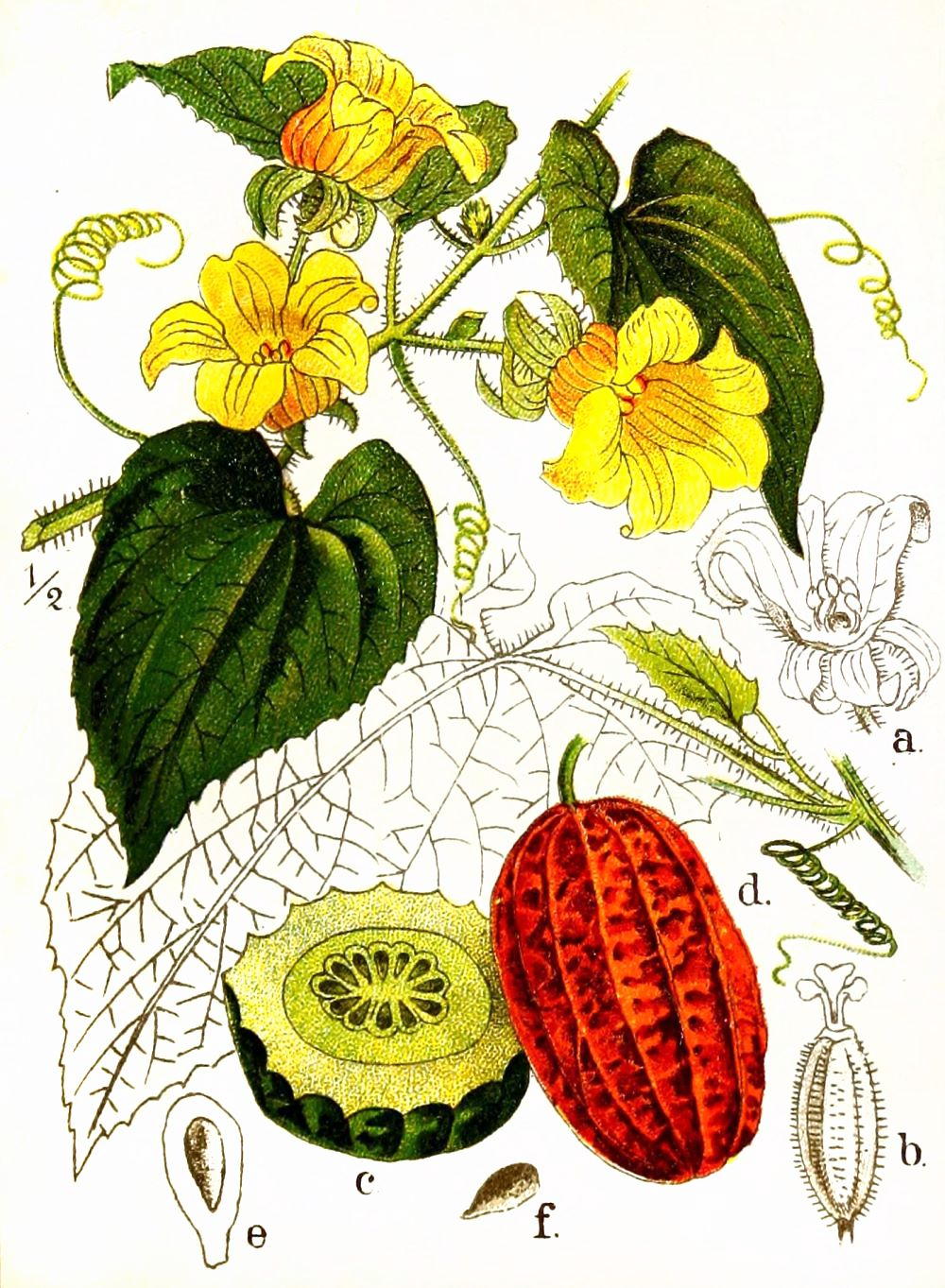

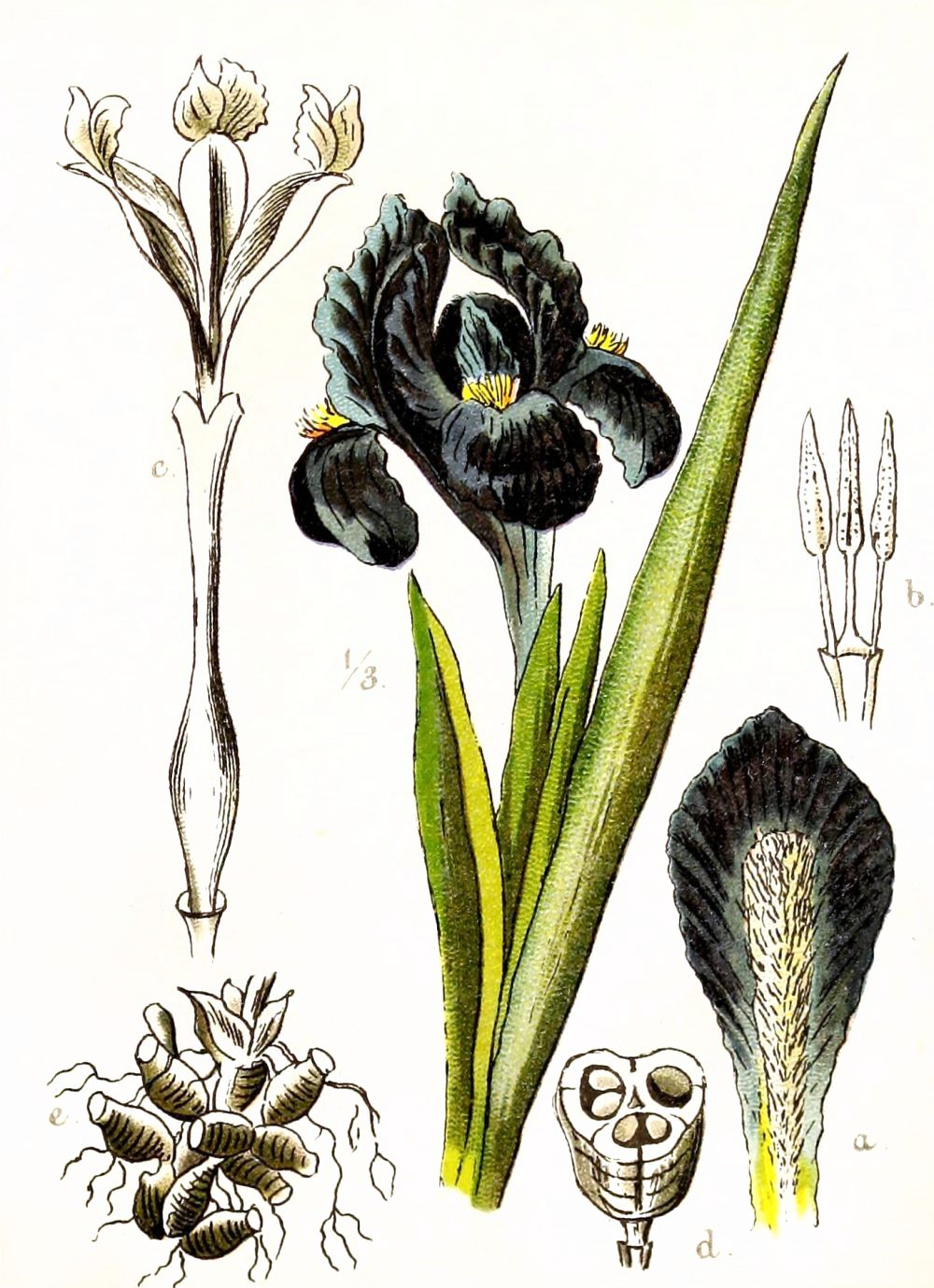

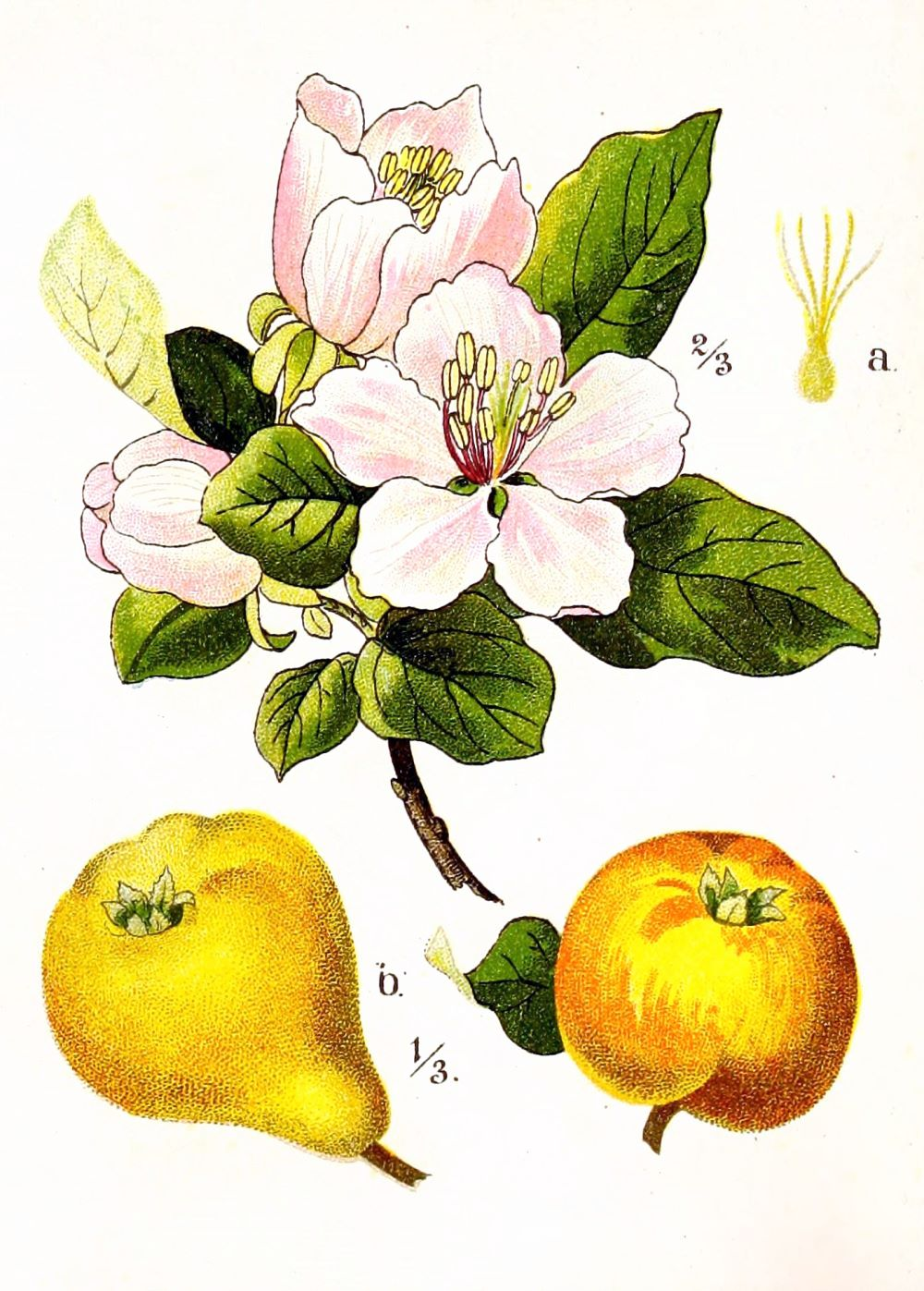

== Reputation ==
=== Contemporary ===
Klein was considered an important representative of flower painting during her lifetime, as the German-language encyclopedia Brockhaus Enzyklopädie noted in 1911. In 1905, another German-language encyclopedia, Meyers Konversations-Lexikon, classified the painter among those who "know how to combine the truth of the characteristics with the richness and virtue of the colouring". By that time, Klein's reputation preceded her; various authors and magazines recognized Klein and her work and she was a household name in large parts of the population. The "ingenious" flower painter would paint "professional hand" still lifes that were "highly expressive". Perfect, "amazing" technique is combined with her "soulful penetration of the material". You can literally feel the stirring of the petals, you can guess the fragrance that emanates from them. The focus is not on "timidity" and "scrupulously correctness" but rather on "the spirit of free composition". In addition to the informal, random position of the bouquets, the "brisk" painting also contributes to this. Just as only a "real" artist is able to make use of, Klein captures the liveliness and atmosphere of the flowers. She also succeeds in convincing the viewer with each new piece of flowers that this one is the most beautiful. Because of the "excellent decorative effect" the pictures were recommended both as room decorations and as colouring pages. Shortly after Klein's death, Vincenz Berger named a variety of roses and Kurt Engelhardt a variety of dahlia after her in recognition of her life's work.

=== Retrospective ===
Even if Klein's work – especially in the form of artist-signed postcards – is still present today, the painter herself seems to be an almost forgotten figure. Her name has largely fallen into oblivion. A knowledgeable art-historical discourse has, up until now, not yet evolved. These days the art reception of Klein is limited to a few contributions in non-fiction books and other media such as enthusiast blogs on the web. These include statements by the cultural scientist Sabine Frank, according to whom the art scene, which was dominated by arrogant "male egomaniacs", has contributed to Klein's rapid fall into oblivion. Because quite a few people probably envied her great business success, Klein was denied the appropriate artistic recognition. Such would be necessary for Germany's best-known flower painter with her unmistakable style, Frank continued. The compositions of her pictures are "brilliant", the technical ability "above any doubt" and their depictions are easily accessible even without any training one the topic of art history. Klein's creations are among the best that still life painting has ever produced, Frank concluded. In addition, the pictures are of particular botanical value due to their accuracy and the great variety of species depicted – unmatched by any other painter.

== General bibliography ==
- Sabine Frank: Rosenliebhaberinnen. Insel, Berlin 2016, ISBN 978-3-458-36137-4.
- Don Barnard: Catharina Klein: A Postcard Catalogue. Semicolon Press, Leamington Spa 1998, ISBN 978-0-9533525-0-0.
- Vilmorin-Andrieux et cie, August Siebert, Andreas Voss (Editors): Vilmorin’s Blumengärtnerei. Beschreibung, Kultur und Verwendung des gesamten Pflanzenmaterials für deutsche Gärten. Band 2, Paul Parey, Berlin 1896 (Illustrations, Digitized).
