= Grete Csaki-Copony =

German painter (1893–1990)

- Born: October 12, 1893; Zărnești, Austro-Hungarian Empire
- Died: December 4, 1990 (aged 97); Berlin, Germany
- Known for: Painting
- Spouse: Richard Csaki

Grete Csaki-Copony (12 October 1893—4 December 1990) was a Transylvanian Saxon painter.

She was born in Zărnești and studied in Dresden, Berlin, Munich and Budapest, where she met and married Richard Csaki (later director of the Deutsches Ausland-Institut in Stuttgart). She spent a lot of time in Berlin from 1911 and was greatly influenced by the art scene in the city. The first solo exhibition of her works was in 1918, in what is today Brukenthal National Museum in Sibiu. Her modernistic art was negatively reviewed in the conservative environment. After an exhibition in Berlin in 1935, the Nazi Germans condemned her art as "Degenerate".

From 1954, she continuously spent part of the year in Greece, where she had an atelier. In 1962, she settled permanently in Berlin.
