= Animalier school =

Animalier school or animalier art was a late-18th and 19th-century artistic genre and school of artists who focused on depictions of animals. The movement was largely centered in France, with some artists producing related subject matter in England, Italy, Germany, Russia, and North America.

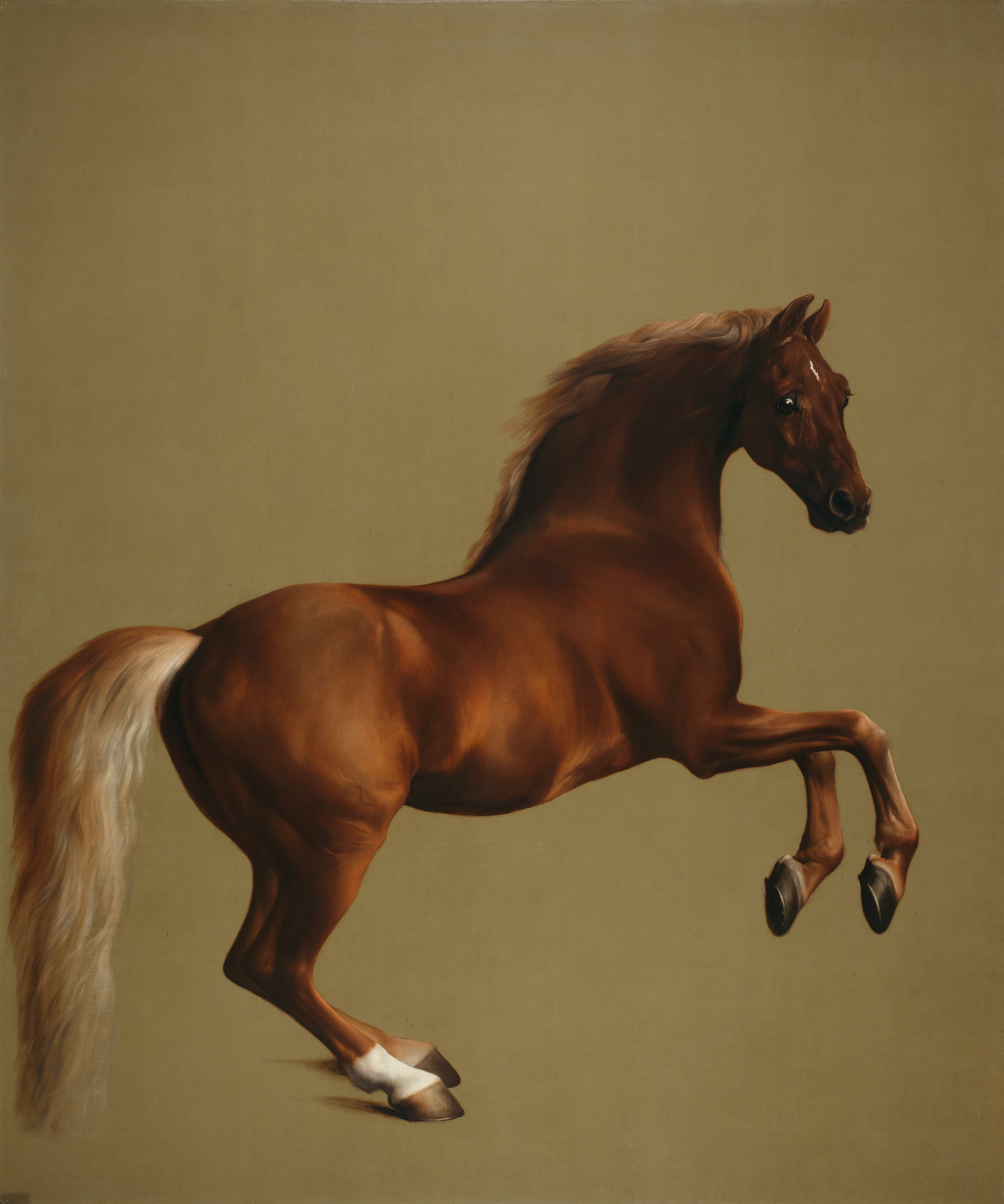
Whistlejacket by George Stubbs

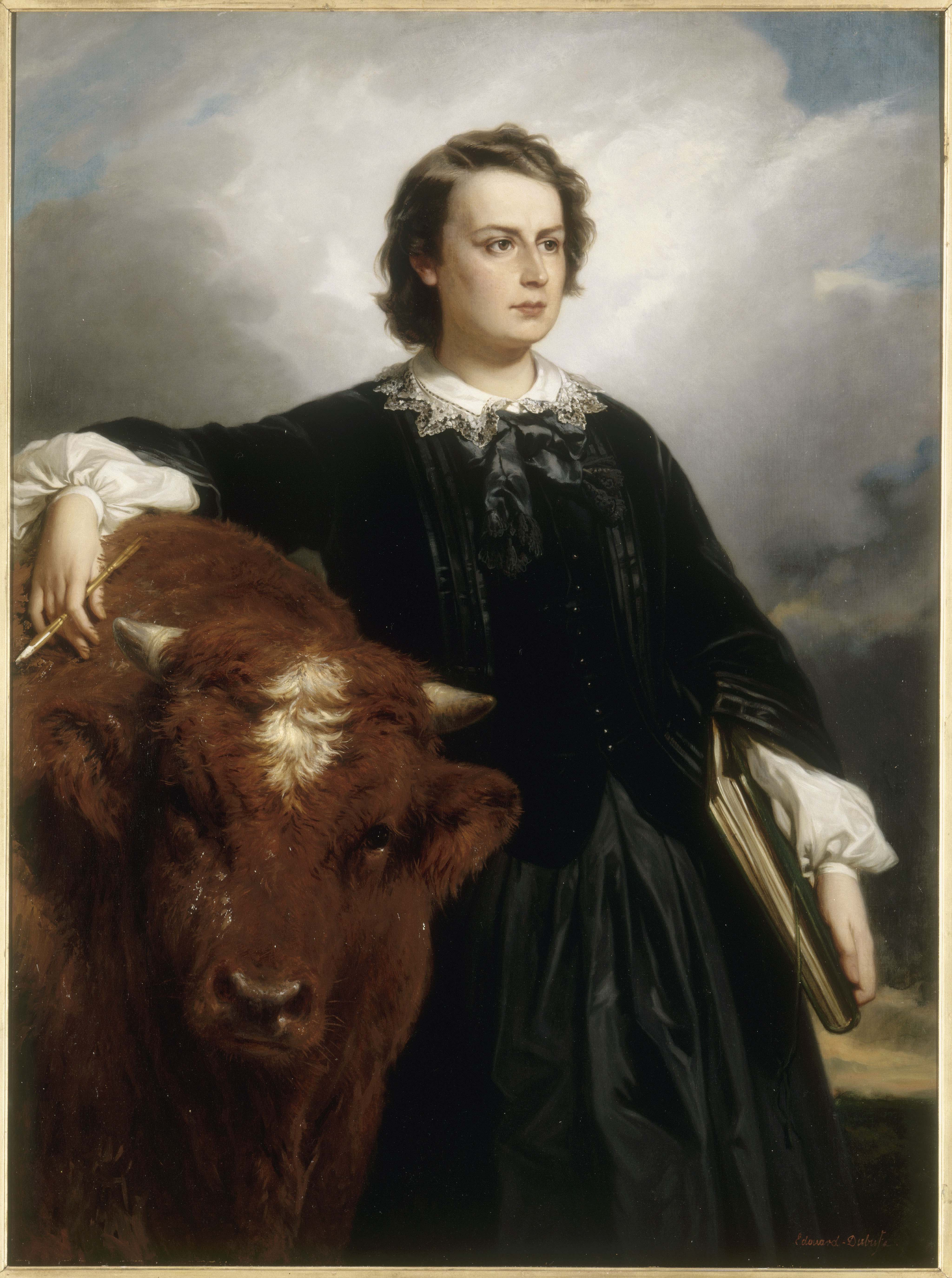
Edouard Louis Dubufe, Portrait of Rosa Bonheur (1857). Symbolic of her work as an Animalière, the artist is depicted with a bull.

The term animalier is most often used to refer to a group of sculptors and painters in mid-century France including Antoine-Louis Barye, Rembrandt Bugatti (felines, human figures, and zoo animals). Jules Moigniez (paintings and sculpture of horses), Rosa Bonheur, and Pierre-Jules Mène.

== History ==
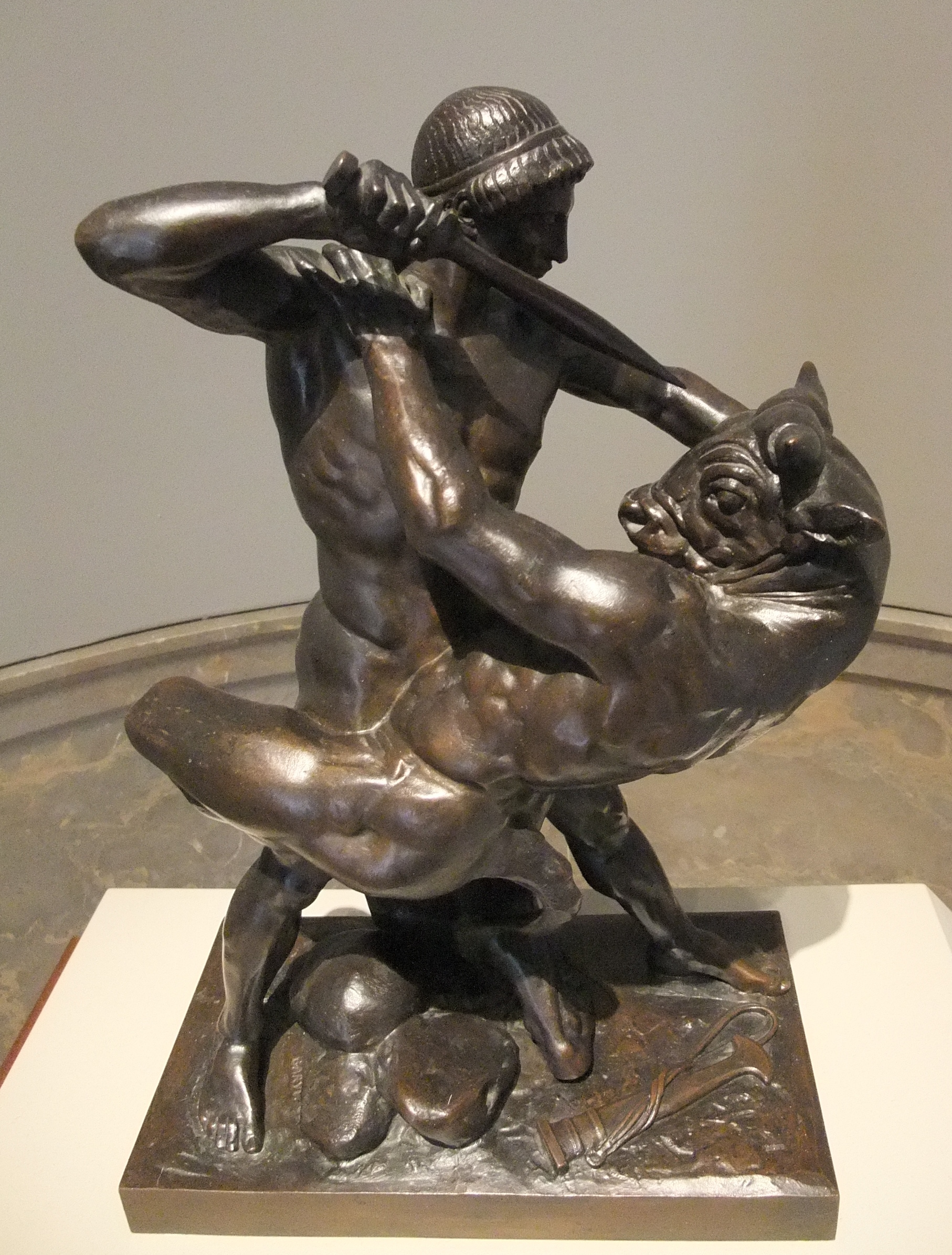
Theseus Slaying Minotaur by Barye

The term animalier was first used by the French press and salon jurors in the 19th century, often as a derogatory term. The Paris salon thought animal subjects too common for fine art, but with the opening of the new Paris Jardin des Plantes zoo and the Ménagerie du Jardin des plantes, interest in animal art increased. The Dukes of Orleans, Luynes, Montpensier, and Nemours were soon to become Barye's patrons. In 1882 Édouard Manet created a portrait in pastel on canvas of the animalier artist Julien de La Rochenoire, which has been owned by the Getty Museum since 2014.

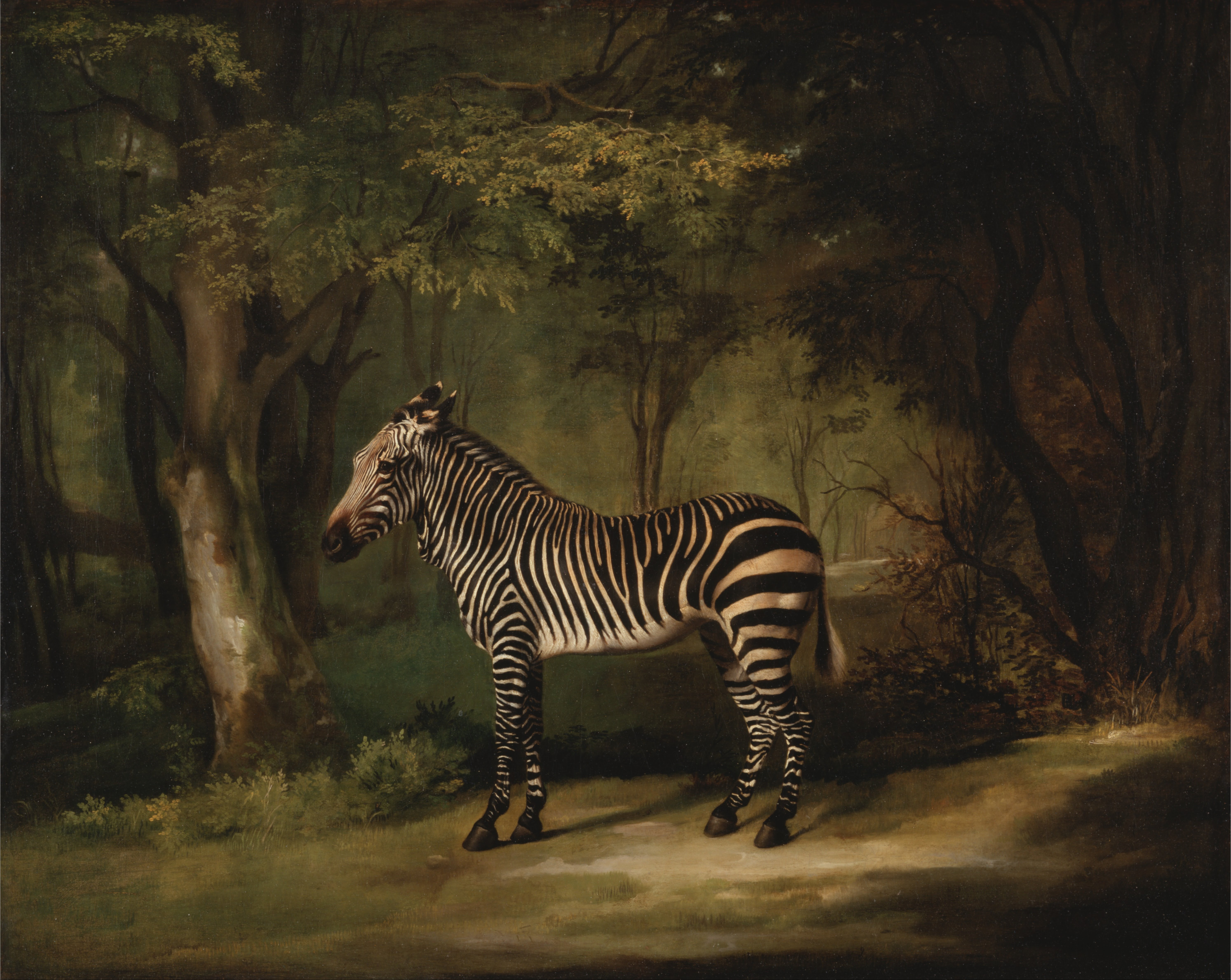
George Stubbs - Zebra - Google Art Project

The art of George Stubbs became a favorite of collector Paul Mellon, who donated many of Stubbs' paintings to the Yale Center for British Art.

It has been observed that "many animal sculptures were modeled in plaster for exhibition and cast later in bronze editions. The size and variety of an edition depended on the popularity of the piece at exhibition, and many Barye, Mêne, and Fratin pieces were so popular that they were cast in very large editions."

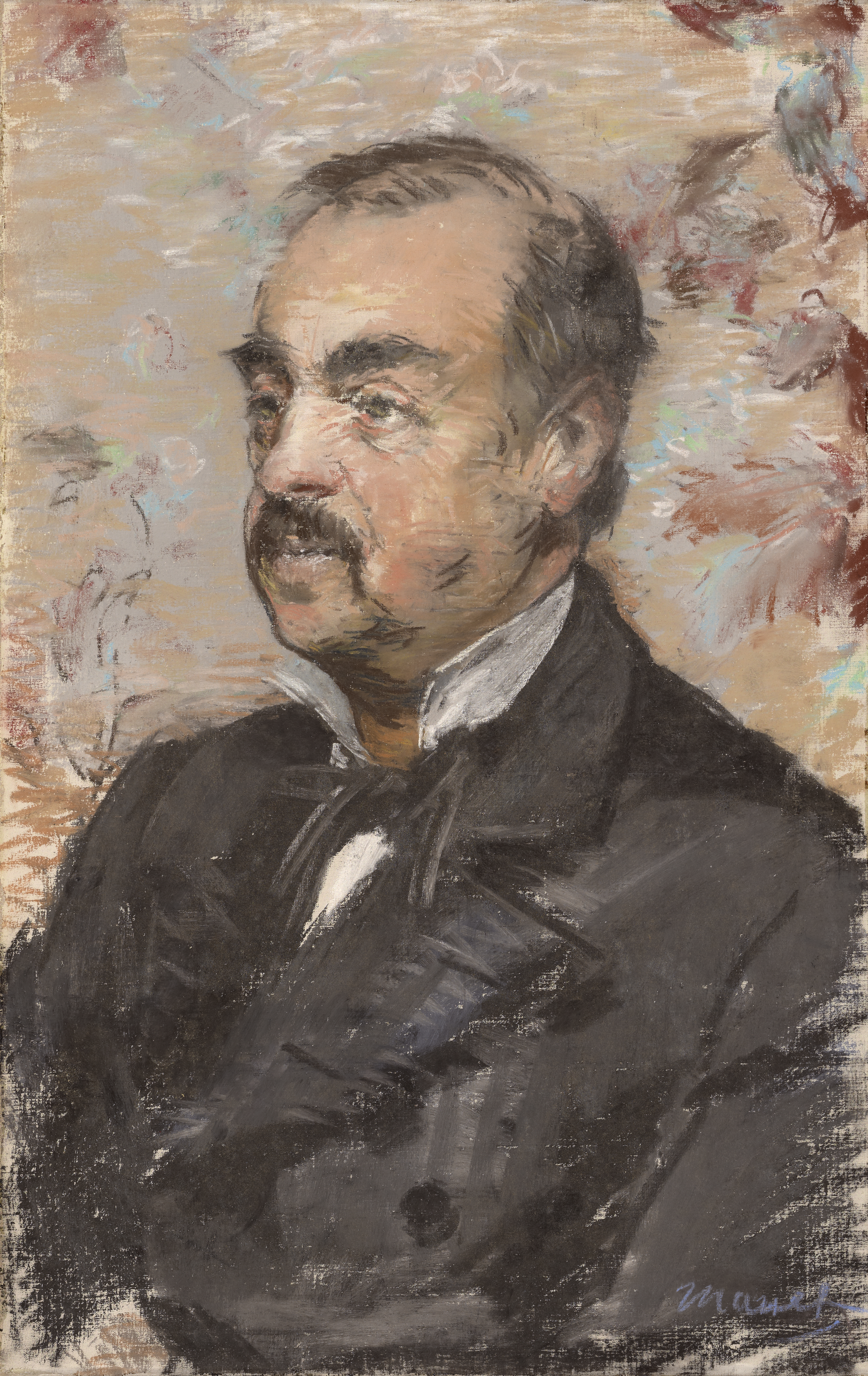
Édouard Manet – Le peintre animalier La Rochenoire

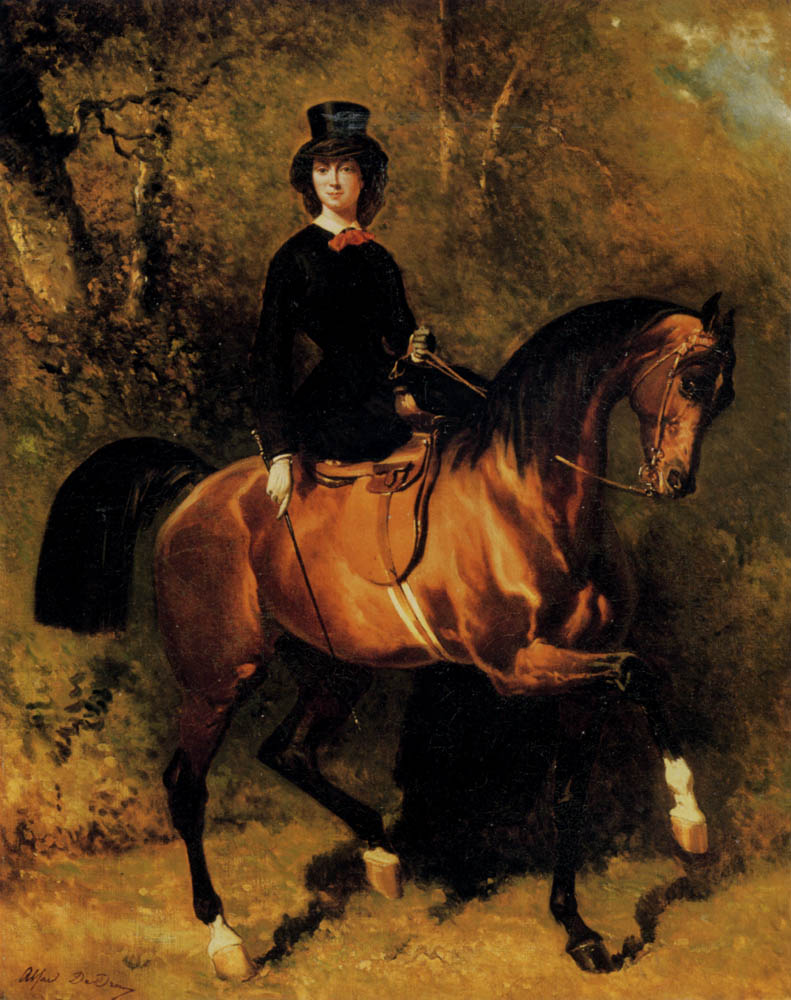
Alfred Dedreux – Une Amazone Au Bois De Boulogne

== Animalier artists ==
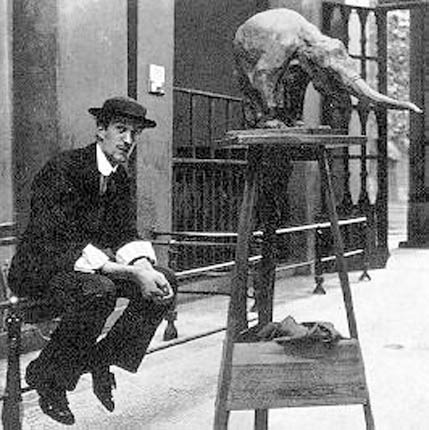
Rembrandt Bugatti at the zoo in Antwerp, Belgium

Artists of the animalier movement were referred to as les animaliers. Important artists of the animalier movement included Antoine-Louis Barye (1796–1875), Rembrandt Bugatti (1884–1916), George Stubbs (1724–1806), Alfred Dedreux (1810–1860), Christopher Fratin (1801–1864), Alexandre Guionnet, Pierre-Jules Mêne (1810–1879). Rosa Bonheur (1822–1899), Isidore Bonheur (1827–1901), Anna Hyatt Huntington (1876–1973), Paul-Edouard Delabrierre (1829–1912), Alfred Dubucand (1828–1894), Jules Moigniez (1835–1894) and Émile-Coriolan Guillemin (1841–1907).

== Animalier reproductions ==
Many beautiful replicas are made of animalier sculpture, which may be cast or molded in any size and of any material. The most desirable of these are exact in detail and made from the same material, such as cast iron, spelter, or cast bronze, as used in the artist's original sculpture. Most of the original animalier sculptors used the traditional lost wax process of casting prevalent at the time. Alexandre Guionnet was exceptional in that he worked in wood. Modern reproductions of the original sculptures frequently use patinated verdigris cast bronze or iron, or bonded marble resin (pulverized reconstituted marble combined with resin glue), as well as various other materials and techniques, such as a composite of Capiz placuna placenta oyster shells, also known as window oyster shells, which come primarily from the Philippines (where they are known as kapiz).
