= Animalier =

Person who creates artworks featuring animals

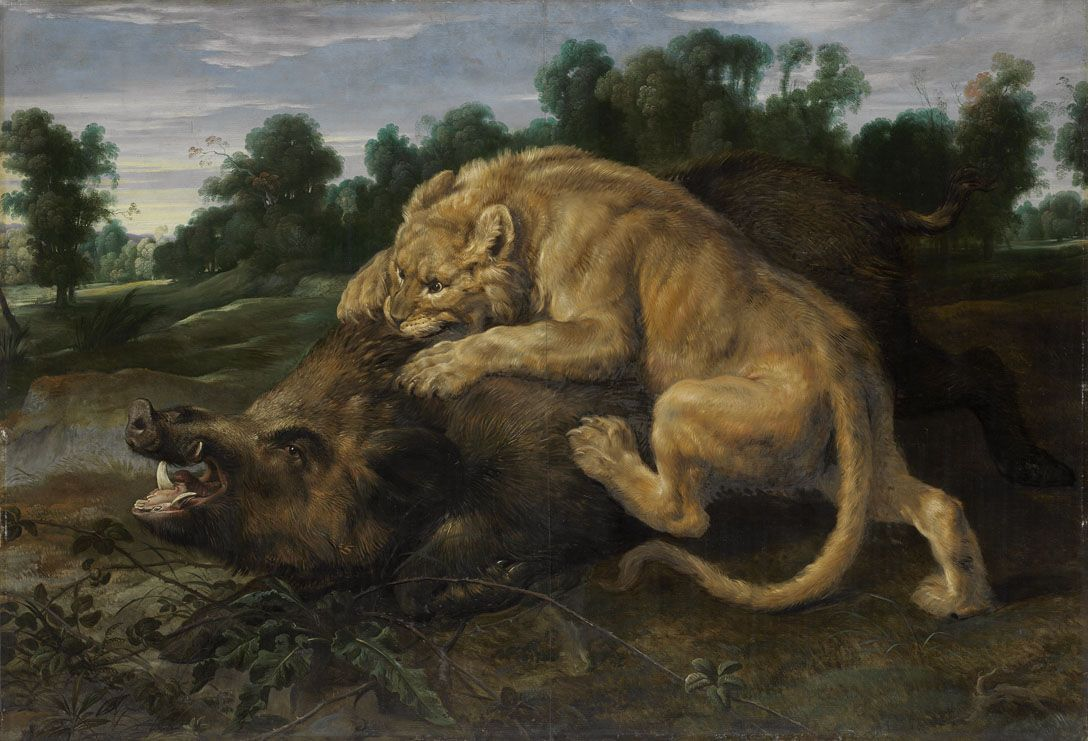
A lion killing a boar by Frans Snyders

An animalier (/ˌænɪməˈlɪər, ˈænɪməlɪər/, UK also /ˌænɪˈmælieɪ/) is an artist, mainly from the 19th century, who specializes in, or is known for, skill in the realistic portrayal of animals. "Animal painter" is the more general term for earlier artists. Although the work may be in any genre or format, the term is most often applied to sculptors and painters.

Animalier as a collective plural noun, or animalier bronzes, is also a term in antiques for small-scale sculptures of animals, of which large numbers were produced, often mass-produced, primarily in 19th-century France and to a lesser extent elsewhere in continental Europe.

Although many earlier examples can be found, animalier sculpture became more popular, and reputable, in early 19th-century Paris with the works of Antoine-Louis Barye (1795–1875), for whom the term was coined, derisively, by critics in 1831, and of Émile-Coriolan Guillemin. By the mid-century, a taste for animal subjects was very widespread among all sections of the middle classes.

== Prominent animaliers ==
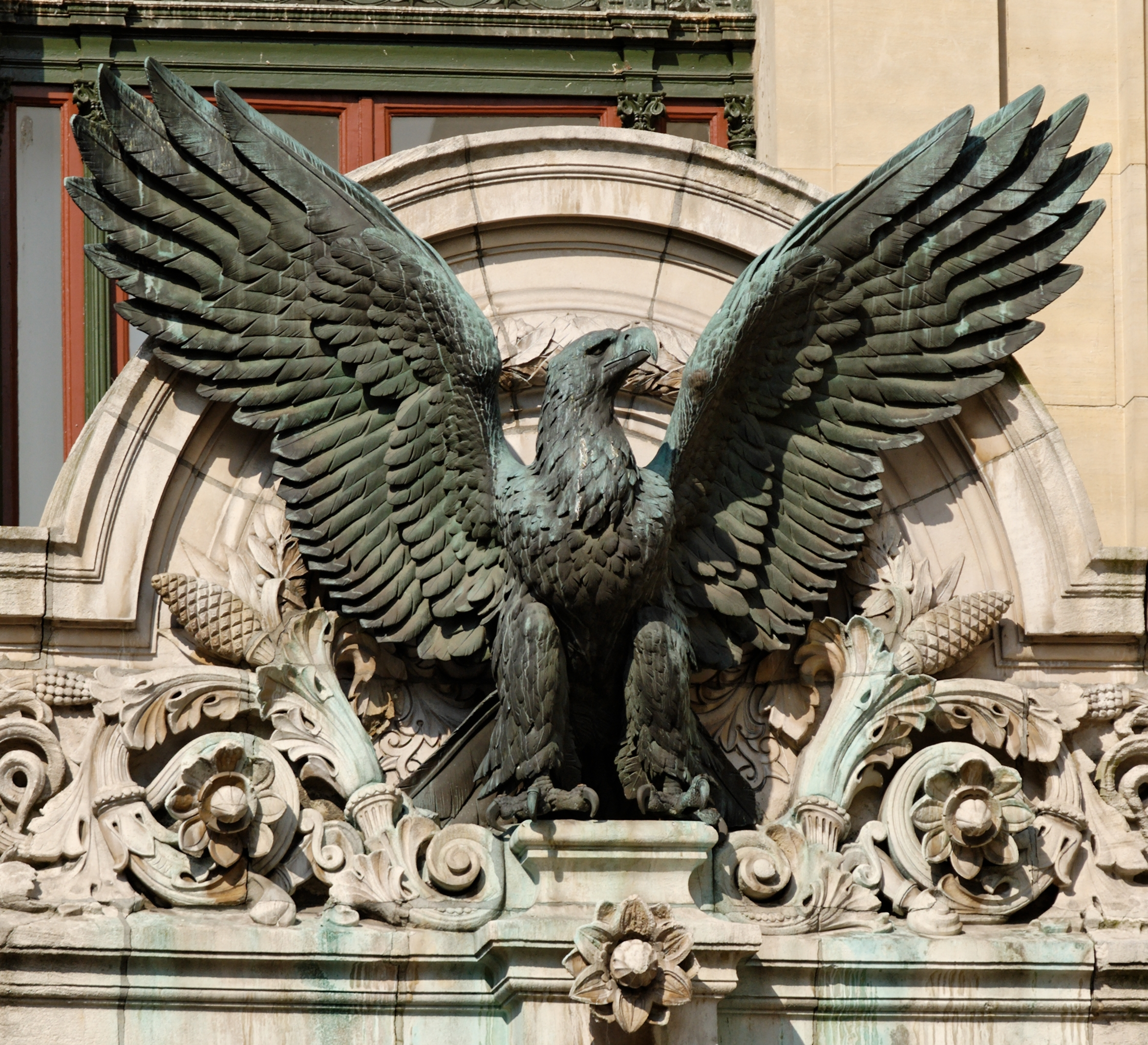
Eagle by Henri Alfred Jacquemart on the Paris Garnier Opera

=== Painters ===
- Richard Ansdell
- Nicasius Bernaerts
- Jean-Baptiste Berré
- Pieter Boel
- Rosa Bonheur
- Jacques Raymond Brascassat
- Pieter Casteels III
- David de Coninck
- Alexandre-François Desportes
- Jan Fyt
- Jacob van der Kerckhoven
- Carstian Luyckx
- Jean-Baptiste Oudry
- Melchior d'Hondecoeter
- Charles Jacque
- Paul Jouve
- Edwin Landseer
- Frans Snyders
- George Stubbs
- Julia Wernicke
- Ernst Zehle

=== Sculptors ===
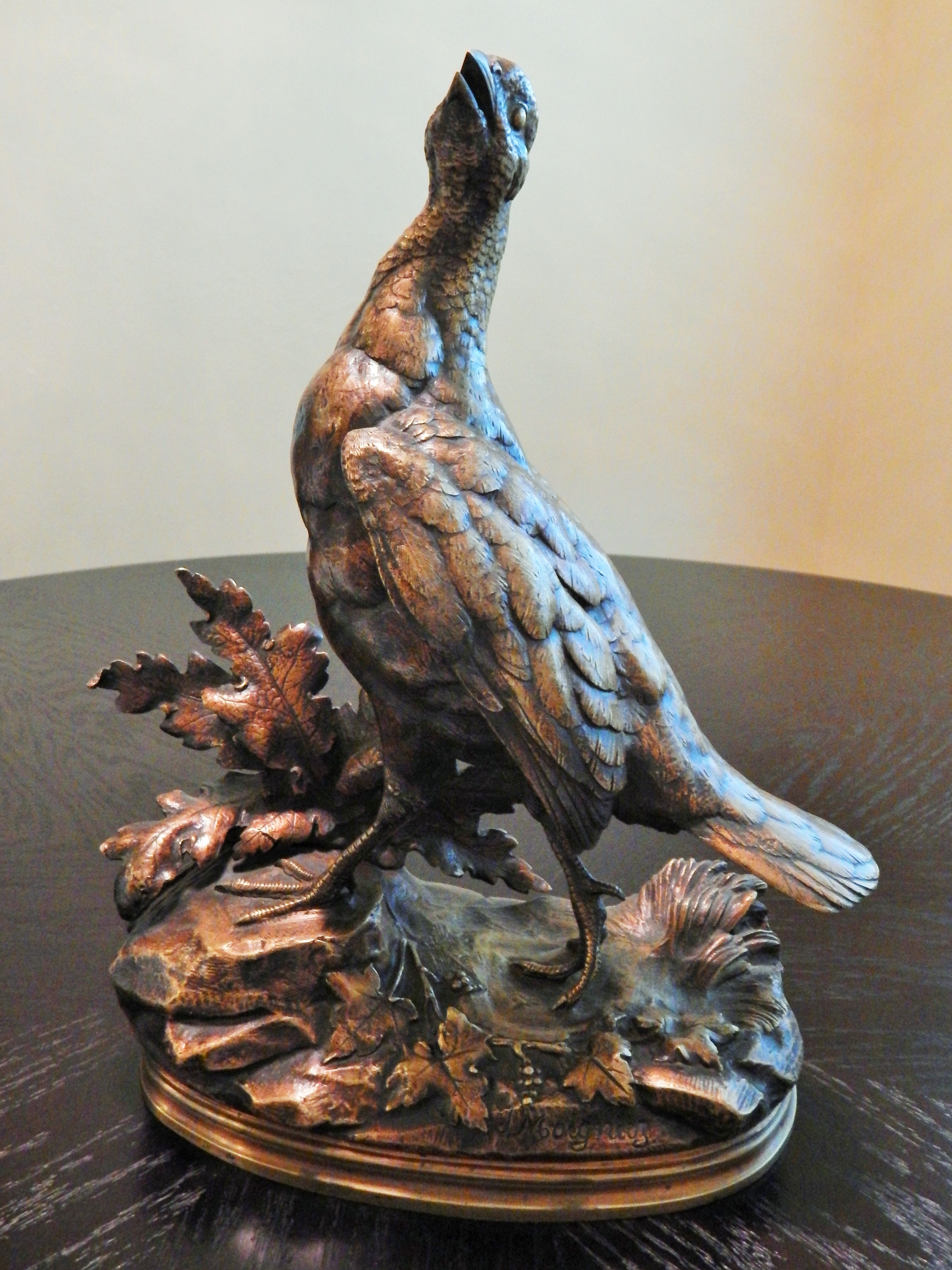
A bronze sculpture of a partridge with gilt patination by Jules Moigniez, c. 1880

- Silvio Apponyi
- Carl Akeley
- Alphonse-Alexandre Arson
- Alfred Barye
- Antoine-Louis Barye
- André-Vincent Becquerel
- Jean-Baptiste Berré
- Joseph Edgar Boehm
- Antoine Bofill
- Isidore Bonheur
- Rosa Bonheur
- Solon Borglum
- Antoine-Félix Bouré
- Rembrandt Bugatti
- Auguste Cain
- Victor Chemin
- Paul Comoléra
- Joseph Csaky
- Paul-Édouard Delabrièrre
- Alfred Dubucand
- Ivan Efimov
- Anton Dominik Fernkorn
- Christopher Fratin
- Emmanuel Frémiet
- Georges Gardet
- August Gaul
- Raymond Gayrard
- Thomas Gechter
- Robert Glassby
- Willis Good
- Émile-Coriolan Guillemin
- Anna Hyatt Huntington
- Herbert Haseltine
- Gaston d'Illiers
- Henri Alfred Jacquemart
- Bohumil Kafka
- Edward Kemeys
- Albert Laessle
- Gertrude Lathrop
- Prosper Lecourtier
- Pierre Lenordez
- Les Lalanne
- Edouard Martinet
- Andrew Martz
- Clovis Edmond Masson
- Pierre-Jules Mêne
- Léon Mignon
- Jules Moigniez
- Auguste Ottin
- Charles Paillet
- Daniel Parker
- Ferdinand Pautrot
- Jules Pautrot
- François Pompon
- Edward Clark Potter
- Alexander Phimister Proctor
- Louis Riche
- Christopher Ross
- Frederick Roth
- Pierre Louis Rouillard
- Edouard-Marcel Sandoz
- Auguste Trémont
- Paul Troubetzkoy
- Pierre-Nicolas Tourgueneff
- Charles Valton
- Vasily Vatagin
- Katharine Lane Weems
- Ernst Zehle
