= Alfred Dubucand =

French artist

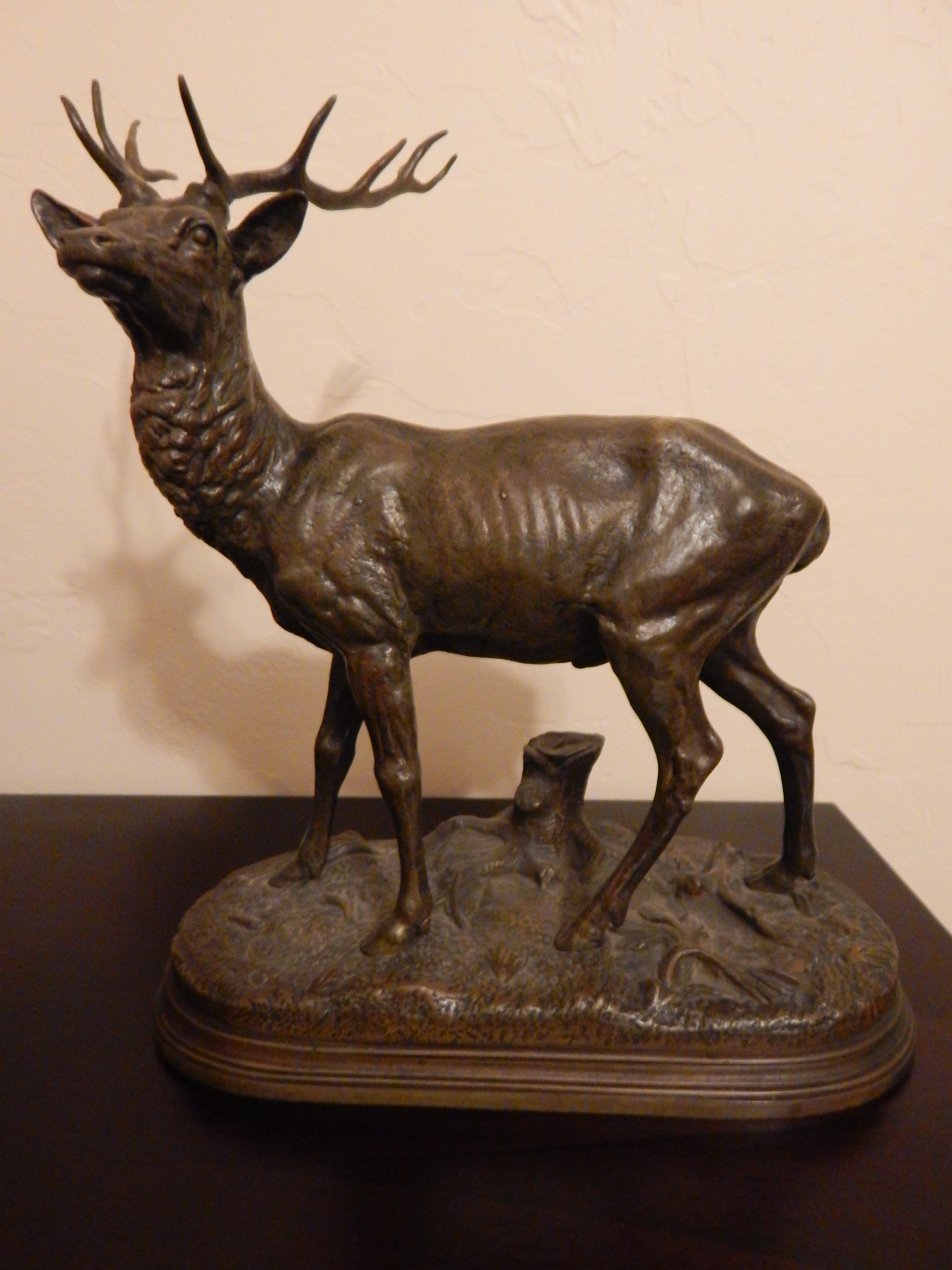
- A bronze sculpture of an elk, Cerf Douze-cors by Dubucand, c. 1870
- Born: 25 November 1828; Paris, France
- Died: 1894 (aged 65); Paris, France
- Education: Studied under Antoine-Louis Barye
- Known for: Sculpture
- Movement: Animalier school

Alfred Dubucand (25 November 1828 – 1894) was a French animalier sculptor who worked in the mid-to-late 19th century. His works were often juried into the annual Salon art exhibition in Paris where he contributed works over the course of his career. Dubucand made his debut at the Salon of 1867 with a wax model of a dead pheasant.

== Early life ==
Dubucand was born in Paris, France, on 25 November 1828. He was one of the prize pupils of Antoine-Louis Barye. Dubucand made his debut at the 1867 Salon with a wax model of a dead pheasant, a rather inauspicious start when considering the higher quality sculptures he would submit later in his career.

== Career ==
He modeled mainly animal groups, producing a number of deer, dog, and horse sculptures. His better casts feature a warm, mid-brown patination, sometimes coming in even lighter shades bordering on a very light yellow, being nearly the color of the bronze metal itself. He frequently experimented with chemical patinas, learning the patination process from his teacher and mentor Barye who stretched the boundary with his now-famous dark green patinas.

Dubucand paid strict attention to the anatomical detail of his subjects, often being so concise that he actually showed the veins in the legs of his deer and elk sculptures. Realism was certainly one of his strong points as a sculptor of animals. His animals never appear "frozen" and he was able to portray each animal's natural movements and stances.

He created his original work in wax or clay and then would cast his pieces in bronze in what is called the lost wax casting method, although some of his work was completed using the sand casting method. Many of his orientalist sculptures feature North African scenes portraying Arab tribesmen and nomads aboard horses and camels.

On some of his casts, his name is shown with a backward or reversed "n", the same situation occurring on certain bronzes by Fratin. While an unusual sight to the eye, such instances of the backward "n" do not create any problems regarding the authenticity or originality of the artwork.

Although he would live for another eleven years, Dubucand's final submission to the Salon was Cavalier et femme arabes à la fontaine in 1883.

== Death ==
Dubucand died in 1894, the month and day being unknown.
