= Paul-Edouard Delabrierre =

French sculptor

Paul-Édouard Delabrièrre
- Born: 29 March 1829; Paris, France
- Died: 1912 (aged 82–83); Paris, France
- Known for: Sculpture
- Notable work: L'Equitation
- Movement: Animalier school
- Spouse: Anne-Eugénie Alléon (m. 1868; died 1878)
- Patrons: Louvre

Paul-Édouard Delabrièrre (29 March 1829 – 1912) was a French animalier sculptor who worked in the mid-to-late 19th century and the early 20th century. He had 70 of his sculptures juried into the prestigious Salon art exhibition held annually in Paris. His monumental work called L'Equitation adorns the facade of the Louvre.

== Early life ==
Delabrièrre was born in Paris, France, on 29 March 1829, the son of Louis Henri Delabrièrre and Marie Zoe Delabrièrre (née Chaffard). He first studied painting under the direction of Jean-Baptiste Delestre but ultimately became a sculptor instead. Little is known of Delabrièrre's life besides the work he left behind which exist in bronze, plaster, wax, and terra cotta.

On 20 June 1868 he was married to Anne-Eugénie Alléon who had been twice widowed when her first two husbands, Émile Rubantel (a designer) and Claude Martin (a pawn broker), both died. She died 23 April 1878 in Paris.

== Career ==
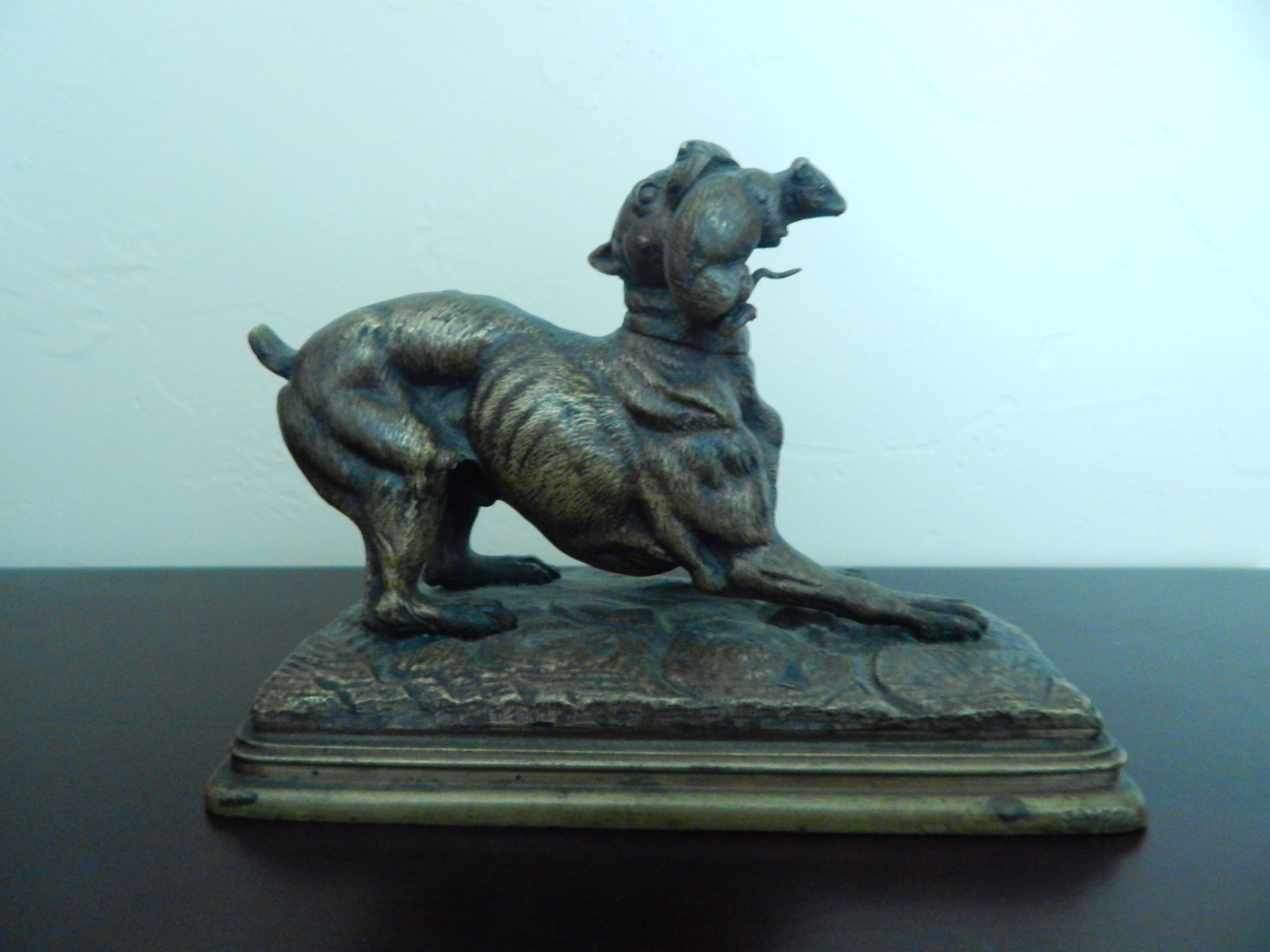
A sand cast bronze sculpture by Delabrièrre of a crop-tailed Staffordshire Bull Terrier proudly holding a rat in its mouth (c. 1859)

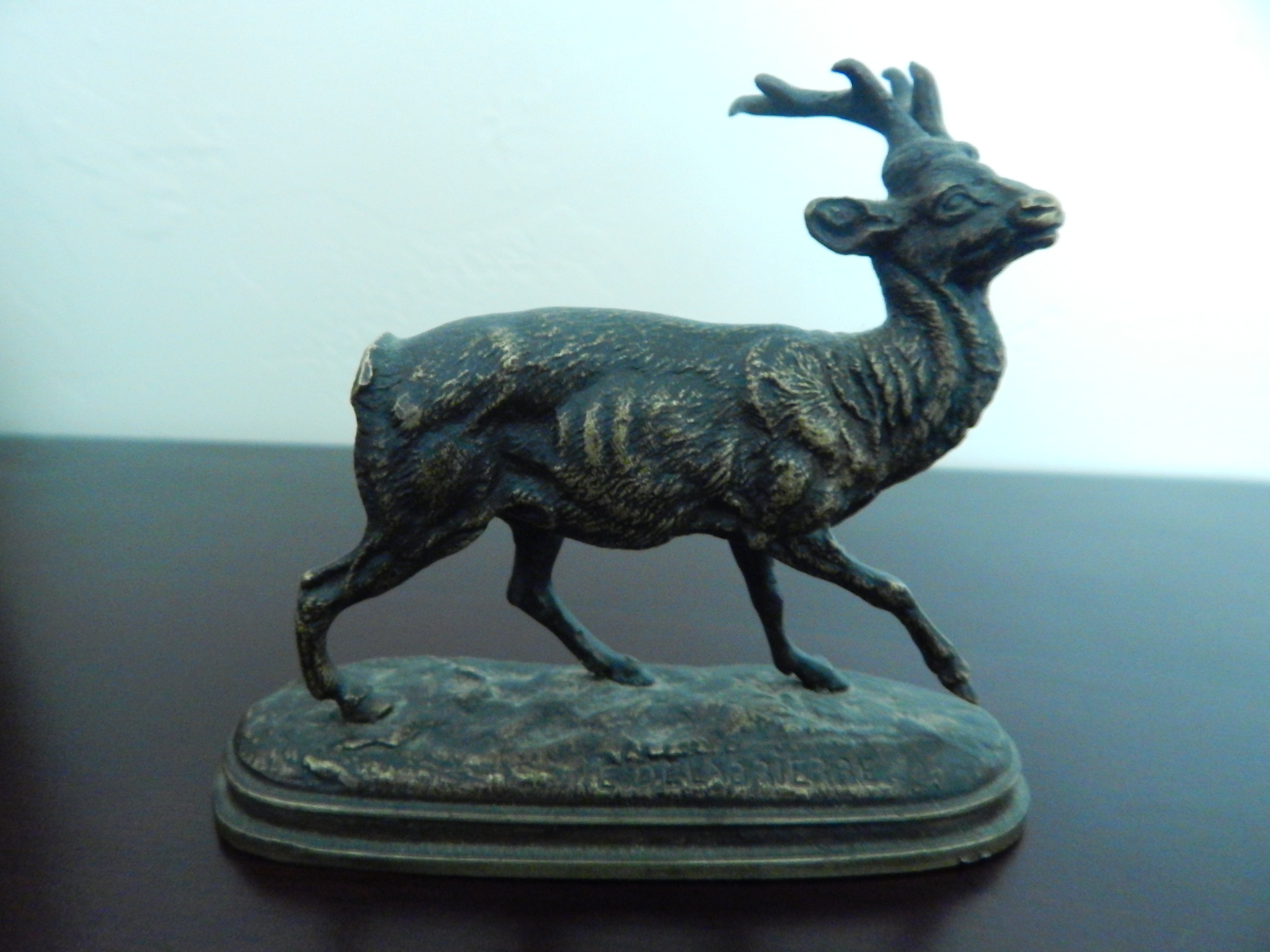
A miniature cabinet bronze sculpture of a deer by Delabrièrre (c. 1864)

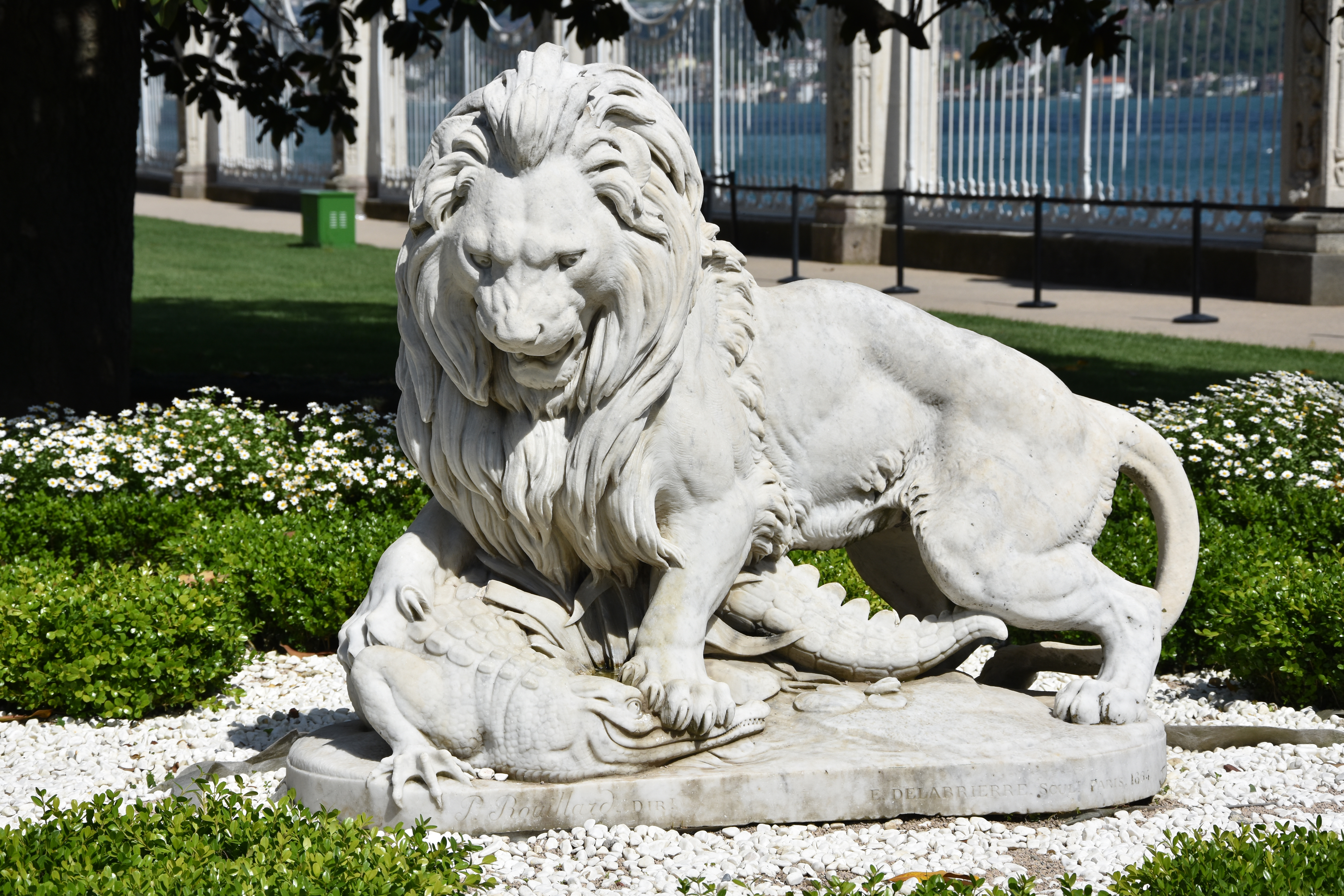
Lion in Dolmabahçe Palace gardens in Istanbul, Turkey

Delabrièrre was an important member of the animalier school who exhibited at the Salon from the Salon of 1848 through Salon of 1882. His first two exhibits were typical of the style of his work throughout his career. He submitted Greyhound Holding a Hare and Wounded Deer. Most of his oeuvre were comparatively small models, however his larger pieces often incorporated figures. His work varies in style and quality with some models directly influenced by Antoine-Louis Barye who was the father of the animalier school.

Delabrièrre's more popular realist bronzes were of impeccable quality and place him in the top echelon of his school. The facade of the Louvre incorporates one of his largest groups, the monumental L 'Equitation, which depicts a horse and two putti, one of whom is aboard the horse. It was completed by Delabrièrre in 1857 and installed that same year. In the final two years of his exhibiting career Delabrièrre experimented with iron as a worthy material for the Salon, although that idea did not go over well with collectors who were accustomed to bronzes. The works that were done in cast iron were produced by the art foundry Durenne Val Osne under the direction of Pierre Louis Rouillard. A list of Delabrièrre's 70 works presented at the Salon can be found in the Dictionnaire des Sculpteurs by Stanislas Lami.

Versatility was one of Delabrièrre's strengths. The range of animals he sculpted covers nearly every large mammal to be found in continental Europe. He also did a few lion and panther sculptures during his career, as well as some camel and bird pieces, but his favorite subjects seemed to be dogs and big cats. He exhibited his Javanese panther in plaster at the 1857 Salon as well as Tigre du Bengale at the 1865 Salon. His repertoire also included some pieces executed in the orientalist genre. Delabrièrre used both the sand casting method and the lost wax method to create his sculptures.

As early as December 1869 his sculptures had begun to be imported to the United States by the Philadelphia jewelry firm of J. E. Caldwell & Co. who had a store at 902 Chesnut Street. The store also advertised works by Jean-Louis Grégoire, Carrier, Moigniez, Mêne, and others. Delabrièrre portrayed realism in nearly all his sculptures. His circa 1870 bronze of a dog defecating took realism to an extreme level and was unusual if not outright strange. The subject matter was likely detrimental to the sales of the sculpture; however, it did possess certain qualities as a conversation piece. Bronzes by Delabrièrre and fellow animalier and countryman Jules Moigniez were popular in Britain and the United States in the late 19th century.

== Selected Salon entries ==
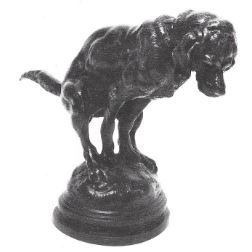
An odd bronze by Delabrièrre showing a dog defecating (c. 1870) (Note: This sculpture was not a Salon entry.)

(Source):

- Lévrier tenant un liévre sous sa patte (1848)
- Combat de cerfs (1849)
- Le Dernier pas, chasse au cerf (1849)
- Tigre royal déchirant un jeune crocodile (1852)
- Cerf d'Amérique blesse (1853)
- Panthére de l'Inde dévourant un héron (1861)
- Cerf de Cochinchine (1864)
- Tigre du Bengale (1865)
- Tiercelet sur perdrix (1873)
- Vache et son veau (1874)
- L'Hallali and Coq faisan effraye par une belette (1875)
- Le Pas-perdu, chasse au renard (1876)
- Retour de chasse, époque Louis XV (1877)
- Chien Braque et liévre (1877)
- Piqueur de Charles IX (1881)
- Picador (1882)
- Chien sur perdrix (1898)
- Chiens courants (1904)

== Museums ==
Some examples of Delabrièrre's work are displayed at the Musée de Picardie in Amiens, France. Included in the Amiens collection is his Panthére de l'Inde Dévourant un Héron (1858) that would later be a Salon entry in 1861.

== Signature examples ==
Example No. 1

Example No. 2

Although his full name was Paul-Édouard Delabrièrre, he almost always signed his sculptures as "E. Delabrierre" in block or semi-block type letters. Occasionally he signed as simply "Delabrièrre" as in the case of a two-humped camel bronze he completed in 1849. The "R" that he used in his signature did not always feature as sharp a curve to the left as shown in signature example No. 1 (above left).

== Death and legacy ==
Delabrièrre died in 1912 and is remembered as an important member of the animalier school. His monumental work L'Equitation can be found on the facade of the Louvre.
