= Jean-Baptiste Delestre =

Painter, art historian and critic

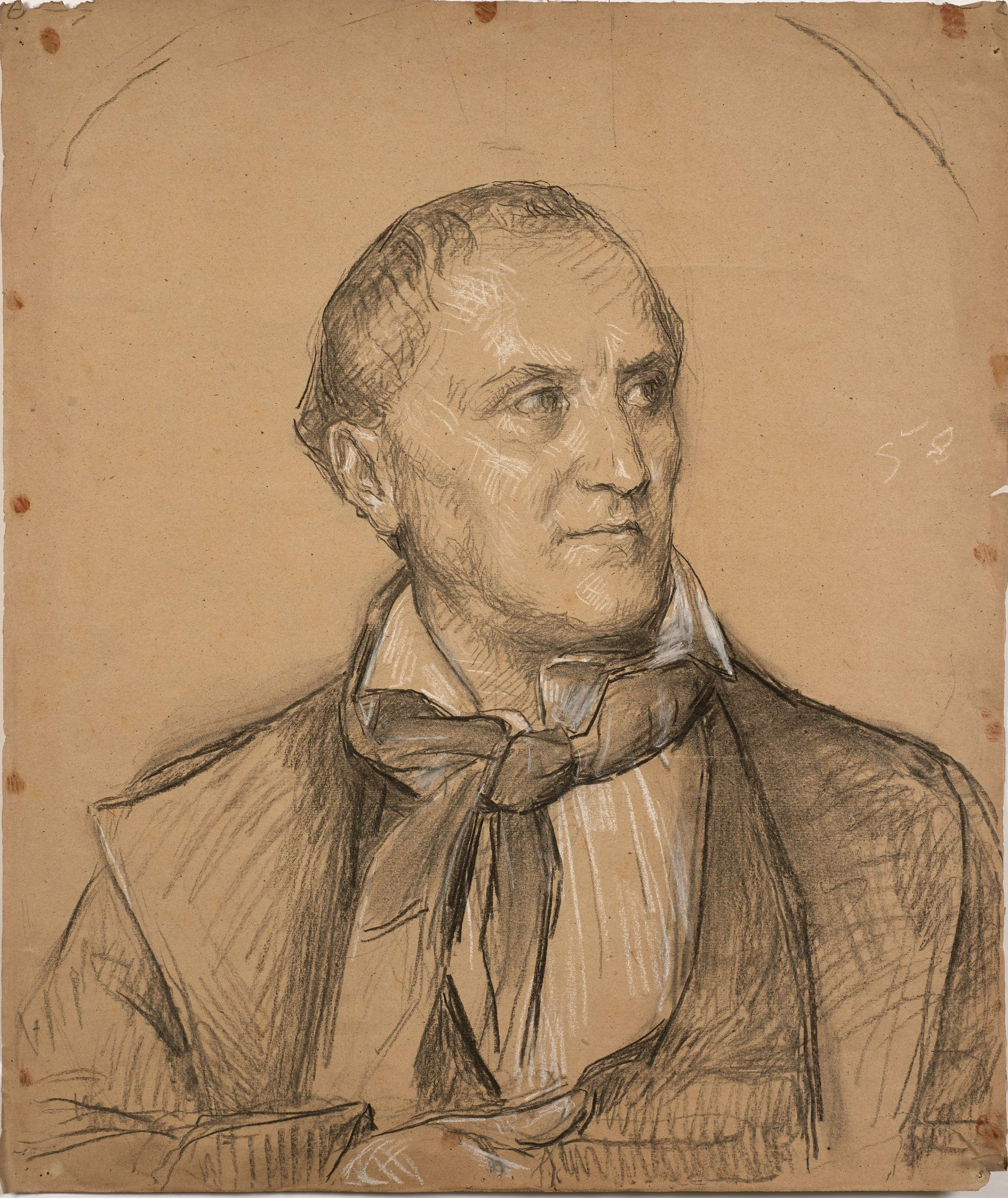
Portrait of Jean-Baptiste Delestre, circa 1868, by Auguste Couder

Jean-Baptiste Delestre was a French artist and writer upon art. His painting "Scene during the eruption of Vesuvius" is displayed in the Museum of Nantes.

== Early life and career ==
Delestre was born at Lyons in 1800. He was a pupil of Gros, and he also studied water-colour painting and sculpture; after a time, he abandoned the practice of art, and devoted himself to history and criticism.

Paul-Èdouard Delabrièrre studied painting under Delestre before eventually turning to sculpture.

=== Politics ===
He was a radical in politics, and took an active part in the French Revolution of 1848. His painting "Scene during the eruption of Vesuvius" is displayed in the Museum of Nantes. His principal writings were "Études progressives des têtes du Cénacle peint a Milan par Leonard de Vinci" (1827) and "Gros et ses ouvrages" (1867).

== Death ==
He died in Paris in 1871.
