= Gaston d'Illiers =

French sculptor

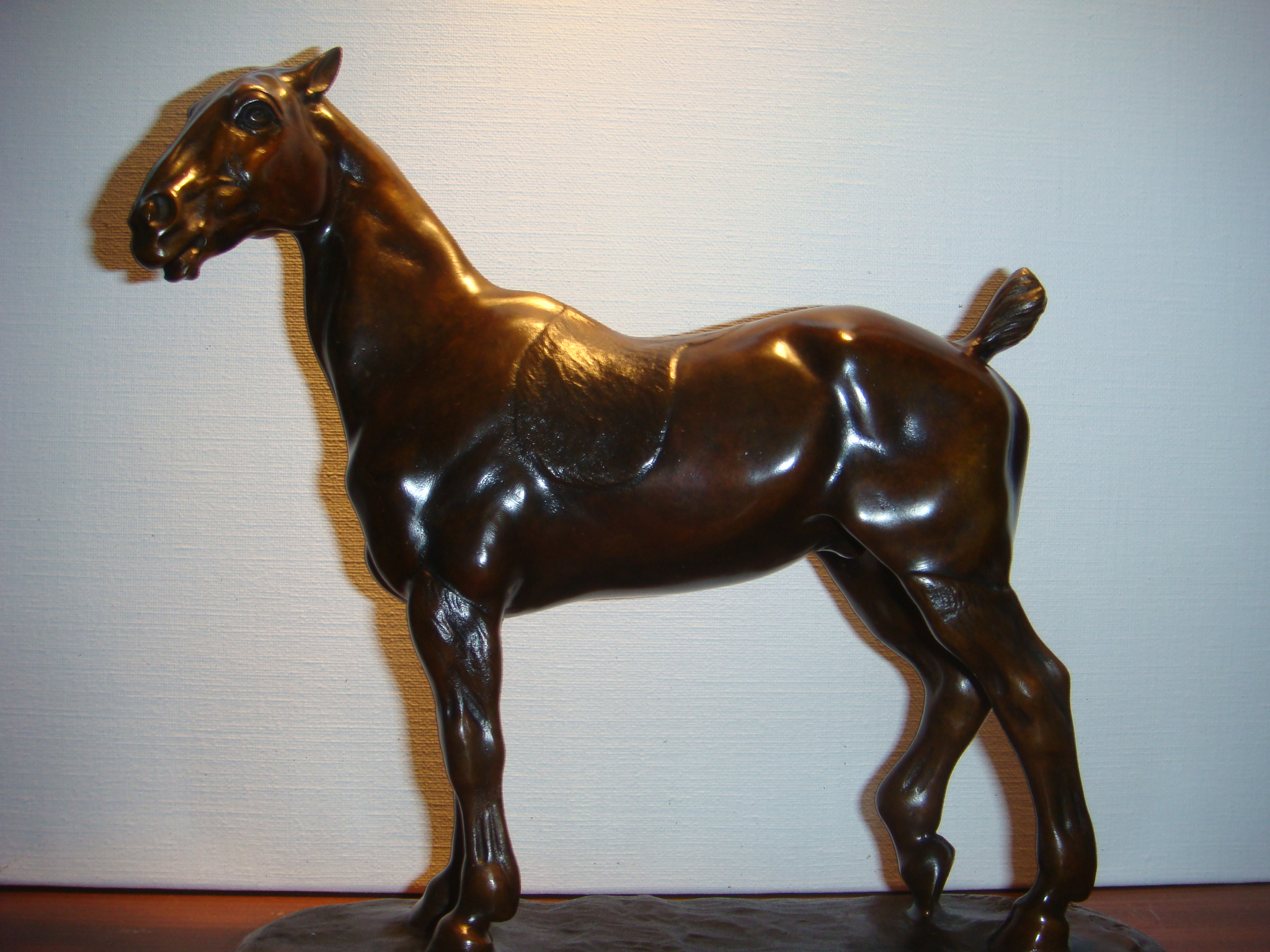
Jack or cob tondu (1928)

Gaston d'Illiers (1876–1932), born at Boulogne-sur-Seine, France, was a French animalier sculptor who specialised in horses. His bronze statuettes are very realistic.

== Biography ==
Gaston d'Illiers devoted all his life to his two passions: horses and sculpture. He was a very fine rider and showed a deep knowledge of horses. He decided to become a sculptor and took to modelling horses.

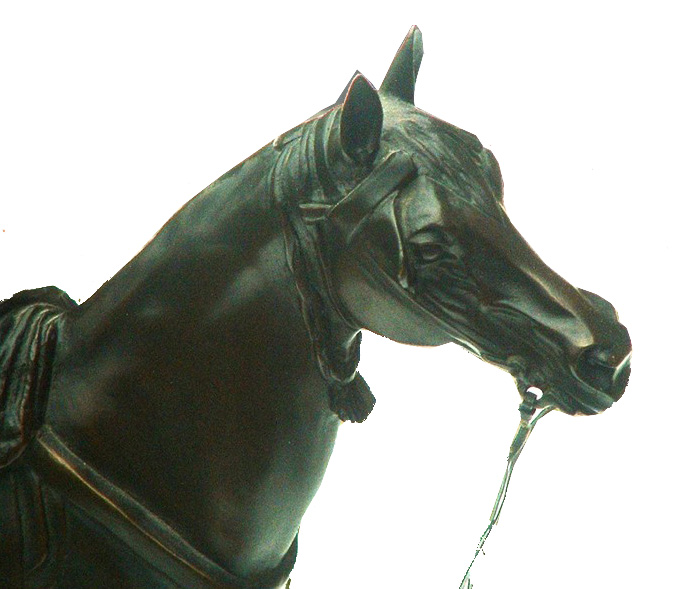
Jument arabe, Arabian mare (1925)

His statues were very appreciated from the start. He showed his productions in specialised exhibitions like "salon des artistes français" from 1899 to his death. He gained quite a reputation among horse experts and art connoisseurs. For example, during his life the statue avant la course (before the race) was often given as a prize to the winner of a horse race or jumping.

His private life was quiet. He was a student of the Count de Ruille and was himself a count and thus enjoyed a life of privilege and nobility, spending all his life in the centre of France, in Orléans and Olivet. He often went hunting on horseback with friends in the woods nearby (Orleans forest, Sologne), and some of his works are related to hunting, for example le piqueux, la curée, and retour de chasse.

He went twice on trips to Algeria in 1899 and 1910, and these trips gave him inspiration for some works which are still very appreciated: jument arabe, fauconniers, and fantasia.

== Works ==
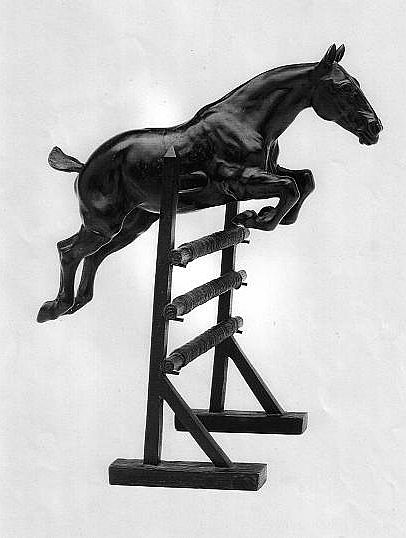
Idylle (1923)

The works of Gaston d'Illiers, small bronze horses, are fine and elegant works of art. They are particularly appreciated by horse lovers because of their precision and fidelity to nature. Although primarily a sculptor of equine subjects, he did produce at least one model of an Alsatian shepherd dog that appears for sale from time to time. Unlike most of his contemporaries who generally used mid-brown colored patinas, d'Illiers almost exclusively used black patinas. It is rare indeed to find a bronze by d'Illiers in a color other than black.

During his life, d'Illiers created around 200 statues. They are all of small size, less than half a meter in each of the 3 dimensions. He modelled them in wax or plaster. The models were then molded to produce a limited number of statues in bronze. Most of the models were damaged during World War II. The manufacturing of the bronze statues is still going on with the remaining models, but on an extremely limited scale. The existing bronze statues are kept by the owners, who seldom sell them. The appearance of a Gaston d'Illiers statue in a sale or a shop is therefore a rare event.

The works of d'Illiers show all types of horses including riding horses, driving horses, military horses, and draft horses. Many breeds are represented: Selle Français, Anglo-Arabian, Thoroughbred, Cob, Boulonnais, Percheron. When persons are present (rider, driver, groom), they are of little importance whereas the horse remains the centre of attention.

Many works are actually portraits of real horses, which accounts for their realism and accuracy. Some are winners of jumping: Idylle, Bulletin rose, Rosette XIV... Others are his own horses or horses belonging to acquaintances: Violette, Jack, Colibri, Esmeralda, Miss, Prince, Dolly, Sydney, sous-off, Lady Hareford, la ruade or poney Coco ruant, cheval aux champs or Coquet au trot, cheval sans terrasse or Sweetheart. His work was also part of the sculpture event in the art competition at the 1932 Summer Olympics.

== Signature ==
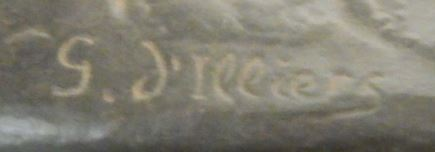
The signature of Gaston d'Illiers

== See also ==
- Animalier, French artists specialized in realistic portrayal of animals
