= Jules Moigniez =

French sculptor

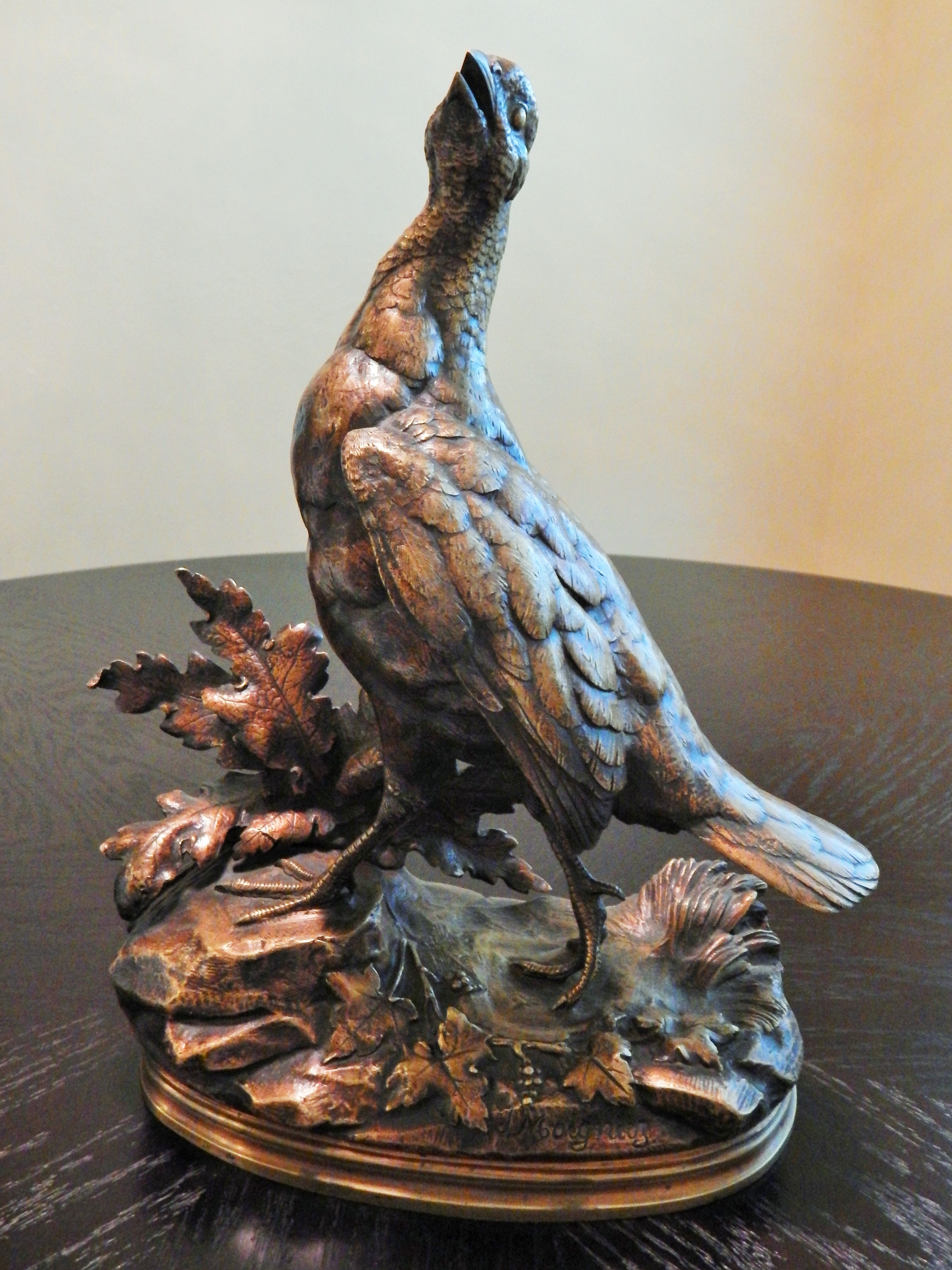
- A bronze sculpture of a pheasant by Moigniez, c. 1880
- Born: 28 May 1835; Senlis, Oise, France
- Died: 29 May 1894 (aged 59); Saint-Martin-du-Tertre, France
- Education: Studied under Paul Comoléra
- Known for: Sculpture
- Movement: Animalier school

Jules Moigniez (28 May 1835 – 29 May 1894) was a French animalier sculptor who worked during the 19th century. His output was primarily cast in bronze and he frequently exhibited his sculptures at the Paris Salon. He was best known for his bronzes depicting birds, although his skill and versatility enabled him to produce quality horse sculptures (primarily racehorses), dog sculptures and hunting scenes. His bird sculptures were among the finest ever created in his time.

Moigniez suffered a long illness in the later years of his life. He committed suicide one day after his 59th birthday.

== Early life ==
Moigniez was born at Senlis, Oise, France, on 28 May 1835, the son of a metal gilder. Moigniez's father bought a foundry to cast his son's sculptures, which was of great benefit to Moigniez as he didn't have the added foundry costs that most of his contemporaries had to pay. Moigniez studied sculpture under the tutelage of Paul Comoléra (a student of François Rude) in Paris. It is quite likely that Moigniez's attraction to bird sculpture was a direct result of his education under Comoléra, who was himself a bird specialist.

== Sculpting career ==
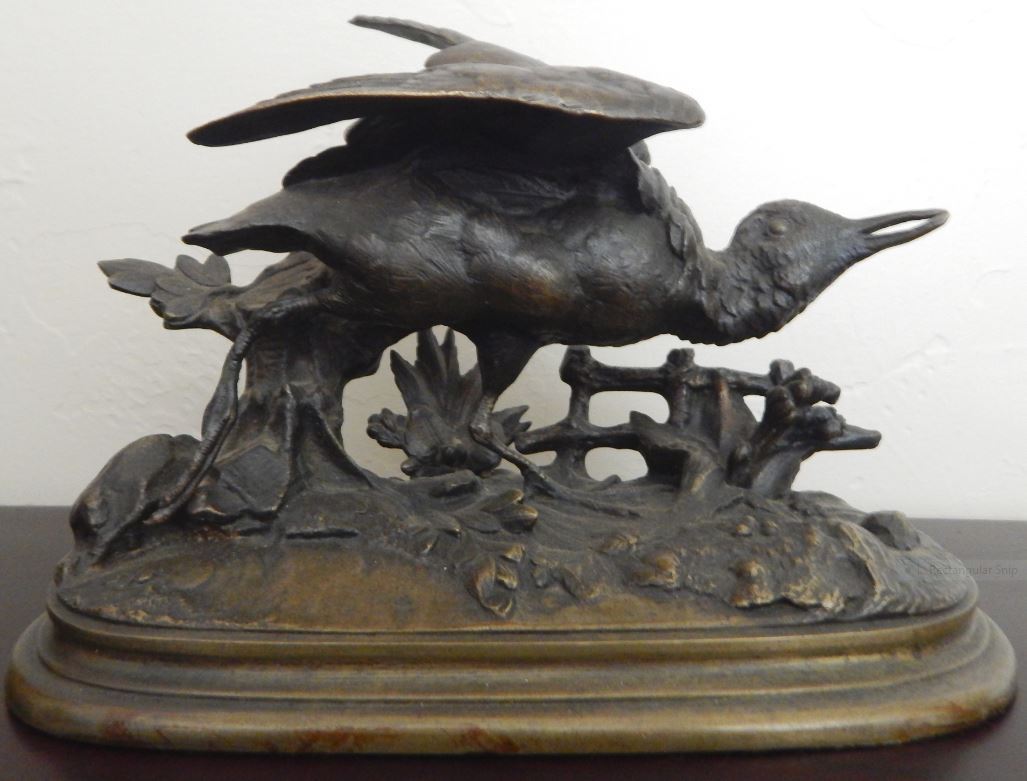
Bronze bird sculpture by Moigniez, c. 1870

Over the course of his 40-year sculpting career Moigniez exhibited thirty works at the Salon between 1855–92. His first submission in a major art exhibition was his plaster, Pointer Stopping at a Pheasant, at the Exposition Universelle of 1855. Moigniez was known for the fine detail and chiseling of his sculptures. His bronzes—usually cast using the lost wax method—were always immaculately chased and patinated, and were especially popular in England and Scotland. More than half of his output during his lifetime was sold in the United Kingdom. By the end of the 19th century, his sculpture had become popular in the United States as well.

In contrast with other animaliers of the period such are P. J. Mêne and Antoine-Louis Barye, Moigniez's bird sculptures often incorporated highly detailed bases complete with bushes, extensive foliage and undergrowth. His castings were generally of excellent quality with a variety of patinas, the gilded and silvered patinas being the most desirable and sought after by collectors.

His bronzes could be reproached for an excess of detail, a result of overly finicky, excessive chiseling. Moigniez received redemption, however, by portraying in his sculpture a certain "elegance of attitudes". His Chien braque arrêtant un faisan (1859), cast in bronze, was acquired by the French government for the château of Compiègne.

As early as December 1869 his sculptures had begun to be imported to the United States by the Philadelphia jewelry firm of J. E. Caldwell & Co. who had a store at 902 Chesnut Street. The store also advertised works by Grégoire, Carrier-Belleuse, Mêne, and other French sculptors.

== Suicide and legacy ==
Moigniez suffered a long illness in the later years of his life. He died at Saint-Martin-du-Tertre, France—by his own hand—when he committed suicide one day after his 59th birthday on 29 May 1894. His grave is located on the left upon entering the cemetery, close to the chapel of Varé. His bird sculptures are among the finest ever created.

== Gallery ==
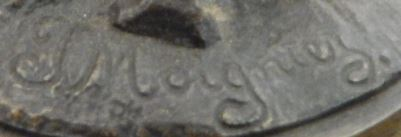
Cursive signature

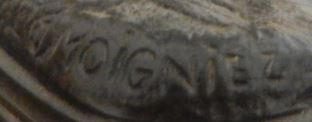
Printed signature

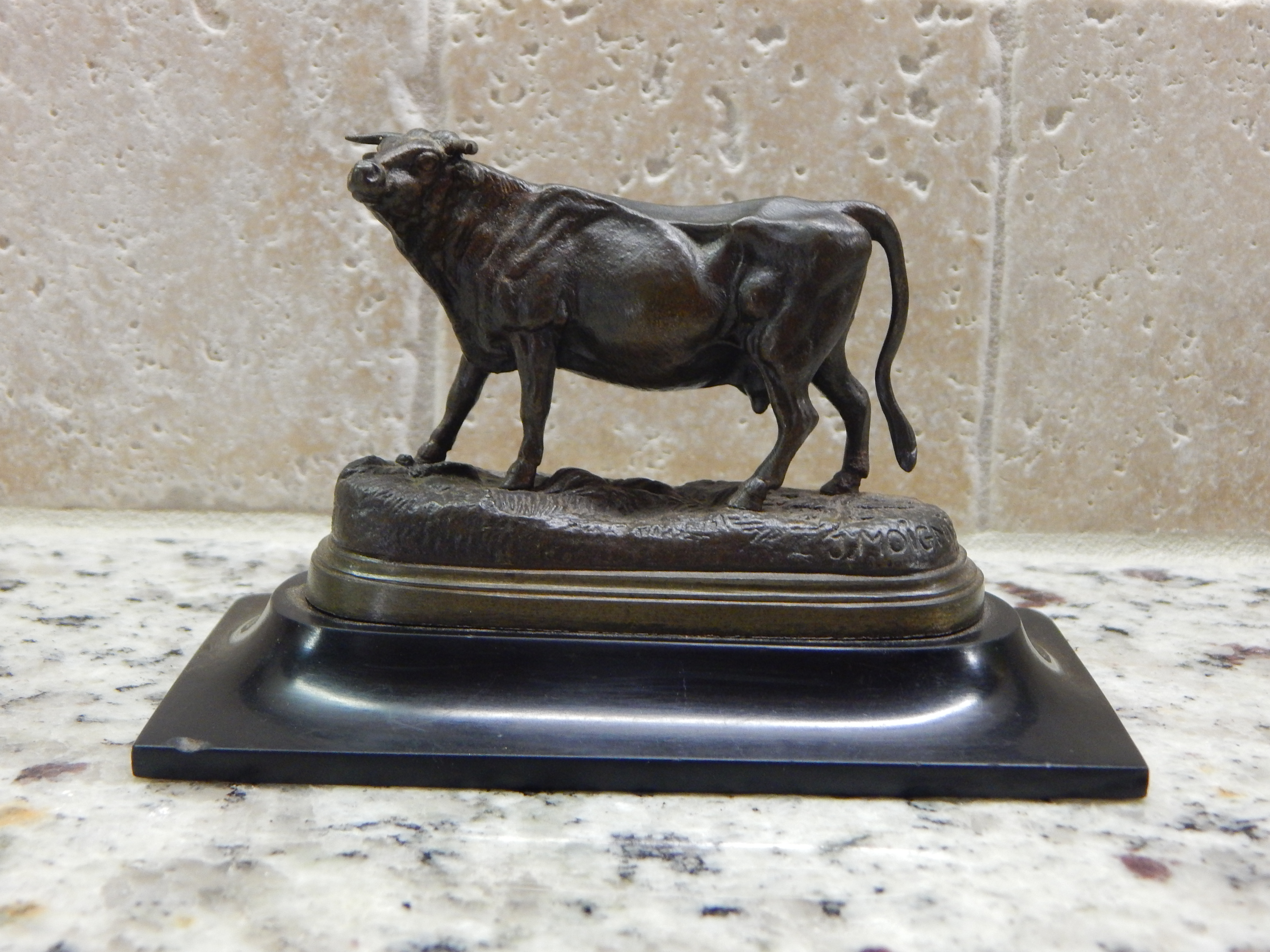
Miniature cabinet bronze of a dairy cow on a slate plinth

== Notes ==
There are no photographs or painted portraits of Moigniez known to exist.
