= Charles Valton =

French sculptor

Charles Valton (26 January 1851, in Pau – 21 May 1918, in Chinon) was a French animal sculptor.

== Life ==
Charles Valton was born in Pau in the Pyrenees but was raised in Paris where he frequented assiduously the botanical garden (Jardin des Plantes). Admitted to the beaux-arts academy in Paris, he was Antoine-Louis Barye's and Emmanuel Frémiet's (the academy's directors and famous sculptors) student.

From 1868 to 1914, Valton produced over 70 animal models and has been nominated professor of sculpture at Germain Pilon's school in Paris in 1883.

One of his famous students is the French sculptor and jeweler Edmond Henri Becker.

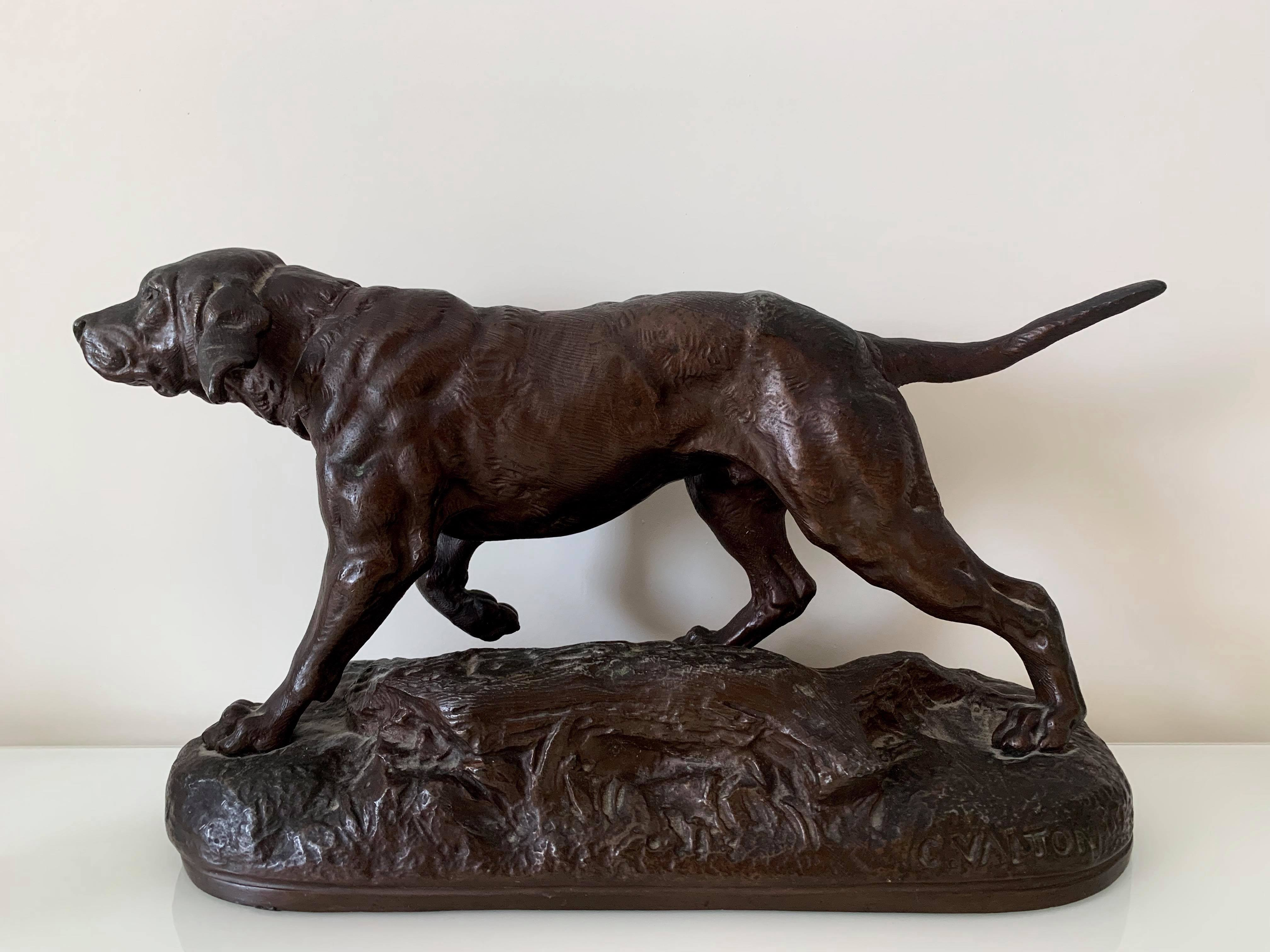
Chien de Chasse, by Charles Valton (private collection)

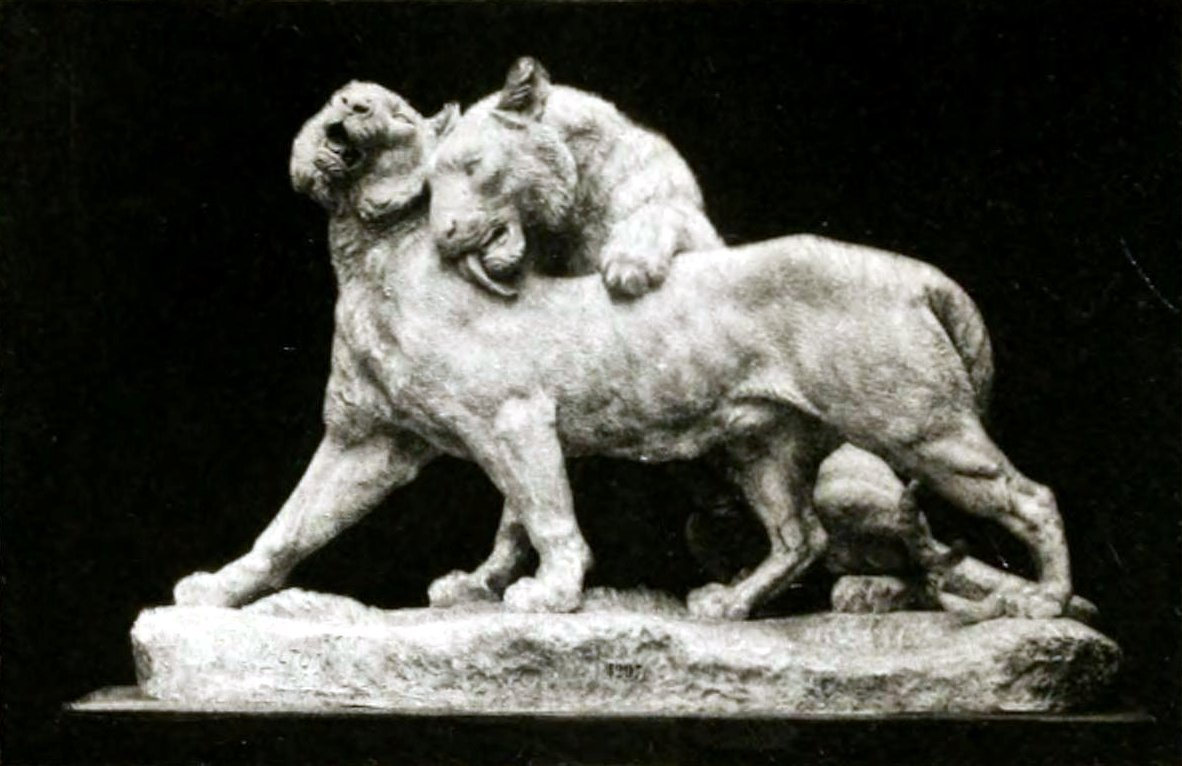
Préludes d'amour, by Charles Valton

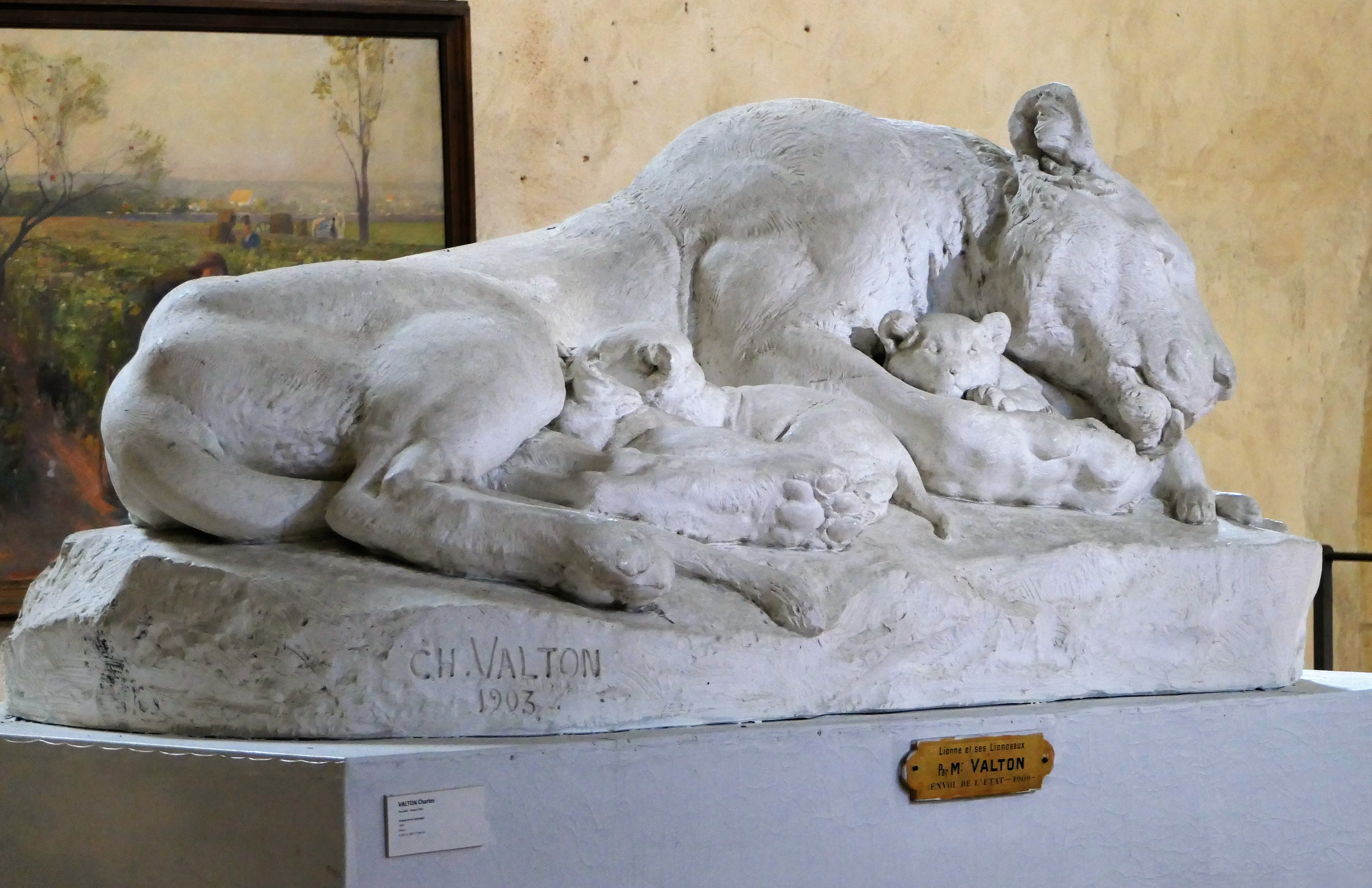
Lionne et lionceaux, Charles Valton (Saint-Nazaire Bourbon-Lancy museum)
