= Ernst Zehle =

German artist and environmentalist

Hermann Wilhelm Ernst Zehle (February 28, 1876 – January 14, 1940) was a German painter, sculptor, and an early environmental advocate. His efforts helped play a role in the restoration of the Eurasian Beaver to its natural ecosystems, and earned him the moniker "Biber-Maler" or Beaver Painter.

== Life ==
Hermann Wilhelm Ernst Zehle was born on February 28, 1876, in Hamburg, Germany, as the youngest of five sons. His father was Otto August Emil Zehle, an artist, and his mother was Anna Zehle, nee Frohnhofer.

Following in his father's footsteps, Ernst Zehle began training as an artist at an early age and attended the Akademie der Künste in Berlin, studying under Paul Meyerheim and Woldemar Friedrich. After completing his tutelage, he began freelance artistic work at his studio in Berlin, where his talent and passion for the natural world began to garner attention. In the words of Ludwig Heck, the director of the Berlin Zoo, Zehle quickly made a name for himself as one of the most important animal painters of his time.

Zehle would work primarily as an oil painter, and would expand his repertoire over time to include casting and sculpting in plaster and bronze. The vast majority of his works feature natural subjects and motifs.

=== Lödderitz ===
Although Zehle lived and worked in Berlin, from a young age he would spend a significant amount of time in the wilderness around Lödderitz, Germany, and it was there he would develop an affinity towards nature. The region is host to many areas of natural beauty and bountiful wildlife, and it became a second home to Zehle. Beginning in 1911 Zehle would produce numerous oil paintings and sculptures depicting landscapes and wildlife from the area.

It was around this time that Zehle was observed at his work by the German Crown Princes Wilhelm and Joachim, as well as the Duke of Anhalt Frederick II. The chance encounter occurred due to the fact that the natural areas around Lödderitz were also a designated royal hunting ground. This introduction to members of the aristocracy, the social influencers of their time, would later play a pivotal role in Zehle's conservation efforts.

=== Career ===
Zehle was first introduced to the public at the Great Berlin Art Exhibition in 1909 with a work entitled 'Suhlender-Hirsch'. His works would appear again in the exhibitions of 1915, 1916, 1920, 1921, 1923, and 1925. His work was also displayed at Berlin's Green Week in 1930.

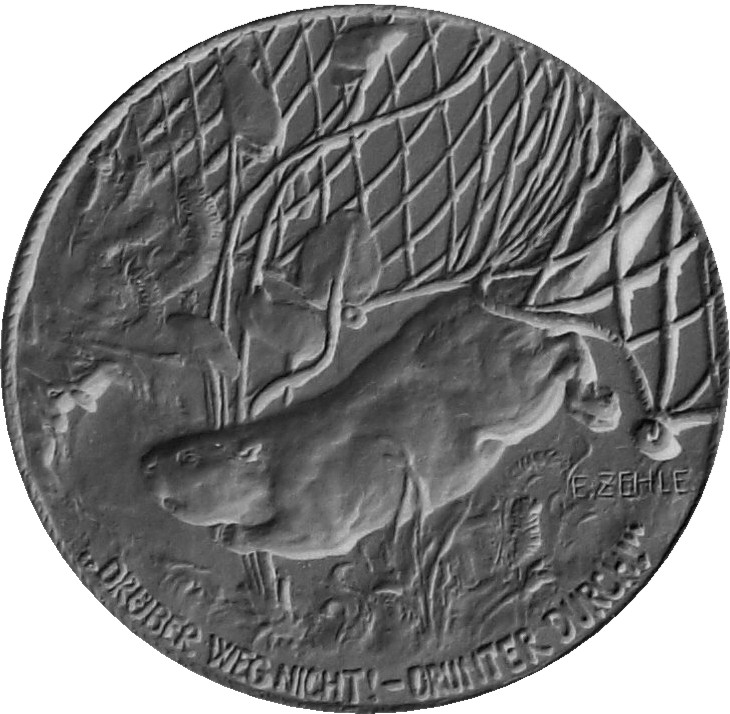
1916 commemorative medallion by Ernst Zehle

During the First World War Zehle cast a series of commemorative medallions to celebrate the return of German submarine Deutschland following its successful penetration of the British naval blockade in the summer of 1916. These were dedicated to Lord Cecil, the British Minister responsible for the blockade, and featured an image of a beaver swimming under a net with the phrase "DON'T GO OVER! GO UNDER!". He would also create other medallion series dedicated to service dogs and their handlers.

Zehle also produced works for, and was featured in, a number of hunting magazines such as Der Heger, Wild und Hund, and Deutsche Jaeger Zeitung. His works were displayed on the front covers, as well as in articles for aesthetic and technical purposes.

==== Environmental activism- Save the Beaver! ====
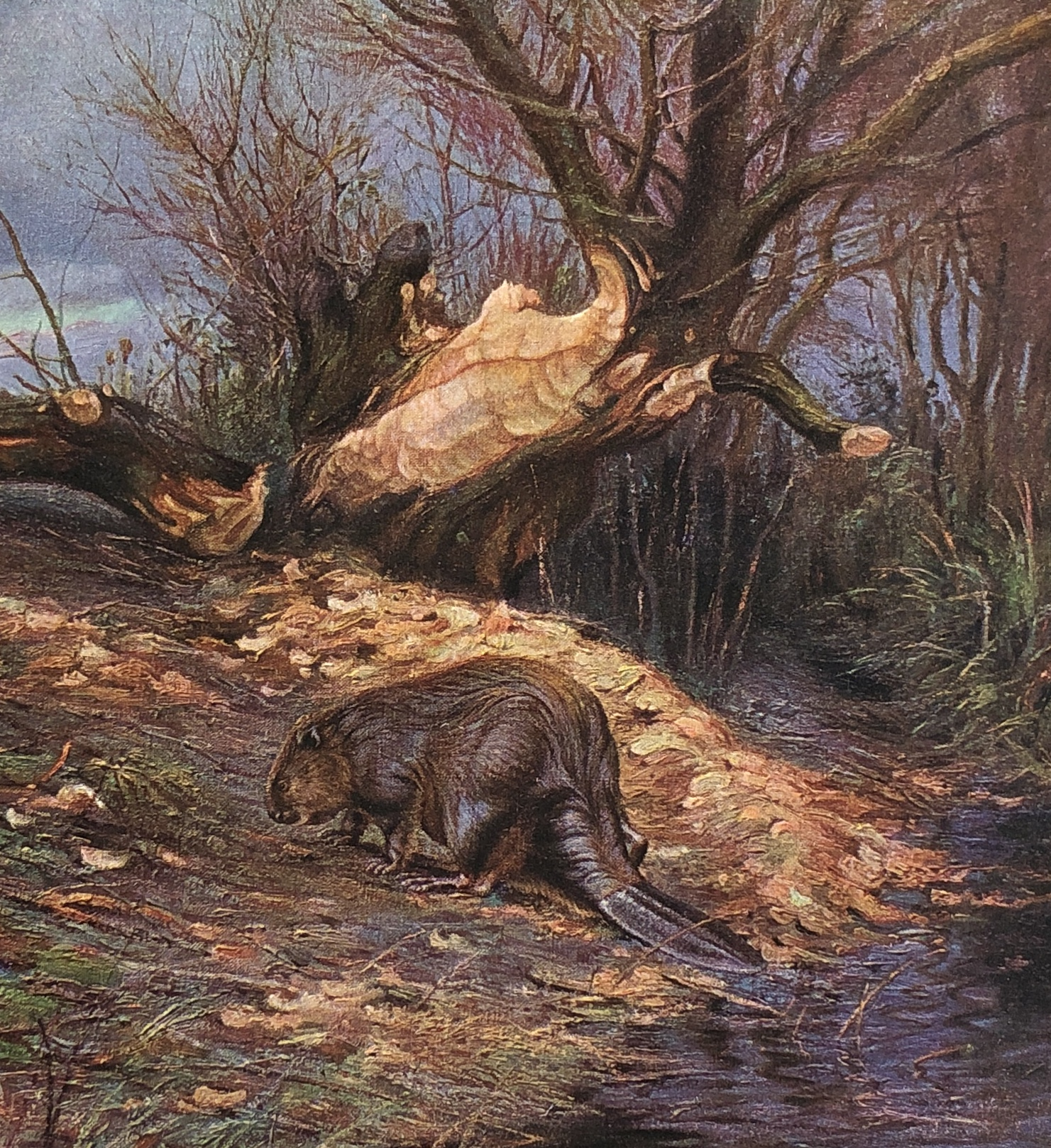
Painting by Zehle

Although not a hunter himself, Zehle was keenly aware of the potential hunters, and in particular aristocratic hunters, had to affect positive change in the natural ecosystem, and his acquaintance with the German Royal Court provided a voice and the social foundations to begin his environmental advocacy efforts.

In 1924 Zehle published the article "Rettet den Biber!" (Save the Beaver!) in Der Heger magazine, which he sought to use his position and leverage with the social elite to affect positive change through altering the perception of the environment in the eyes of those with the agency and power to do so. Zehle worked with other environmentalists, such as his close friend Max Behr 'The Beaver Father' to raise awareness of environmental issues, and provide actionable solutions to them.

As a result of the concentrated efforts of environmentalists like Zehle and many others, the population of Eurasian beavers in Germany rose from near extinction at the start of the 19th century to around 40,000 across Germany by 2019.

=== Death ===
Ernst Zehle died on January 14, 1940, in Berlin of lung cancer. He is buried in the Försterfriedhof Lödderitz.

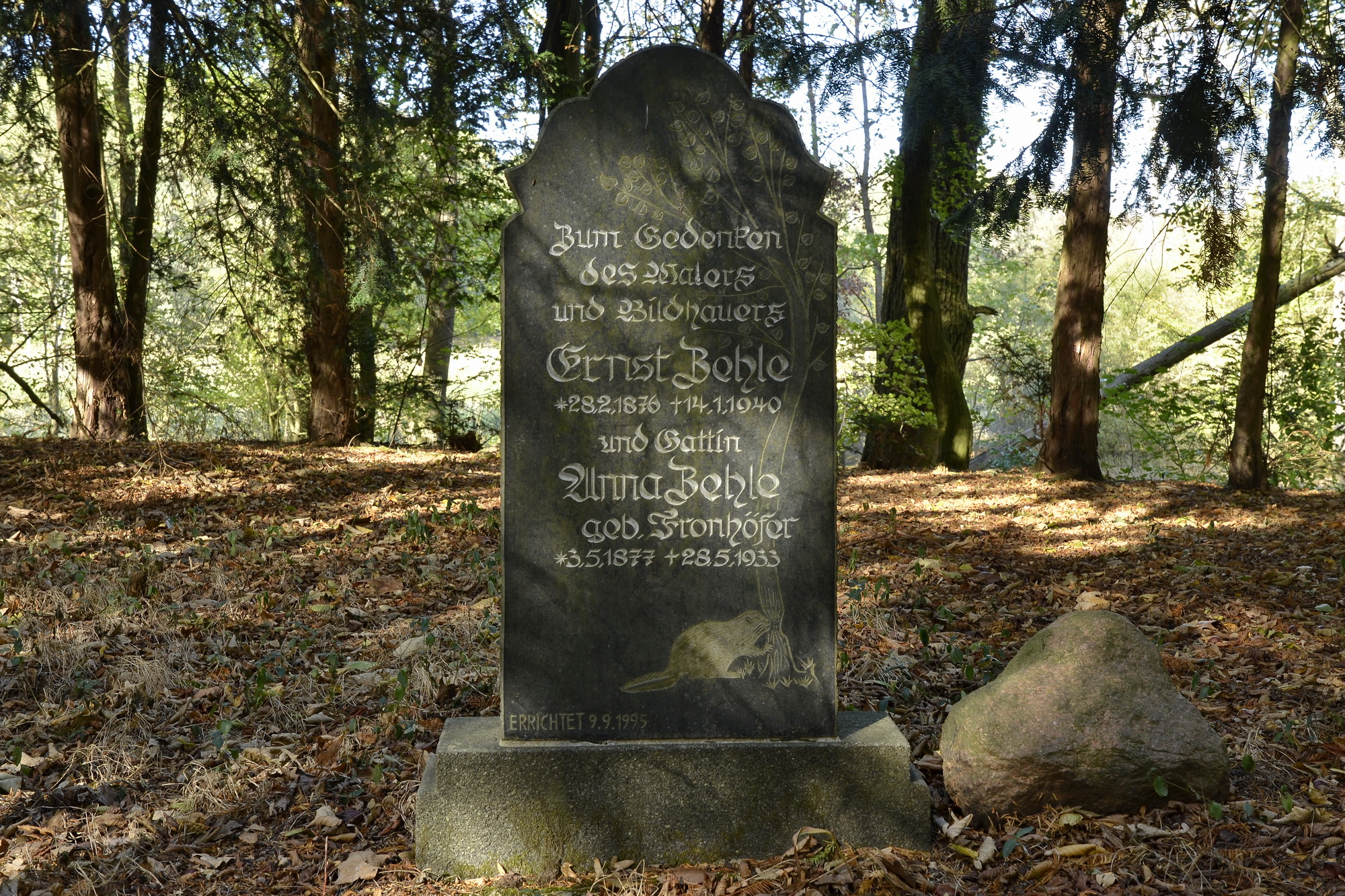
Grave of Ernst Zehle

== Legacy ==
Zehle can be regarded as an early social influencer, in that he identified agents of change and stakeholders, and through his artistic works, sought to influence perceptions in order to affect positive environmental change.

The Museum with the largest collection of Zehle's works is the Salzlandmuseum (Schoenebeck District Museum). Other Museums which hold works by Zehle include: Das Münzkabinett der Königlichen Museen zu Berlin, Das Museum für Stadtgeschichte Dessau, and the Bode-Museum in Berlin.

== Gallery ==
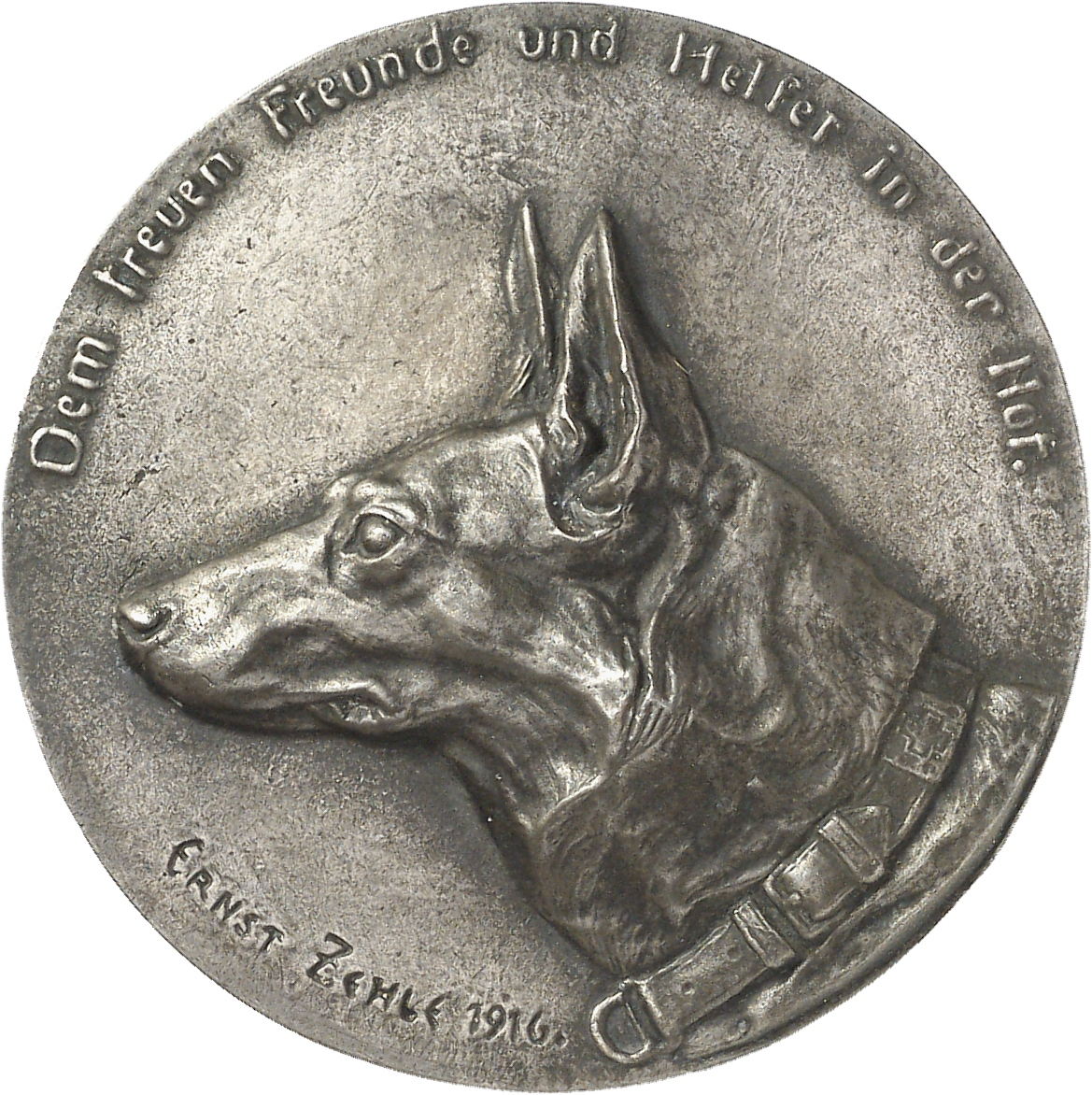
The faithful friend and helper in need- Obverse

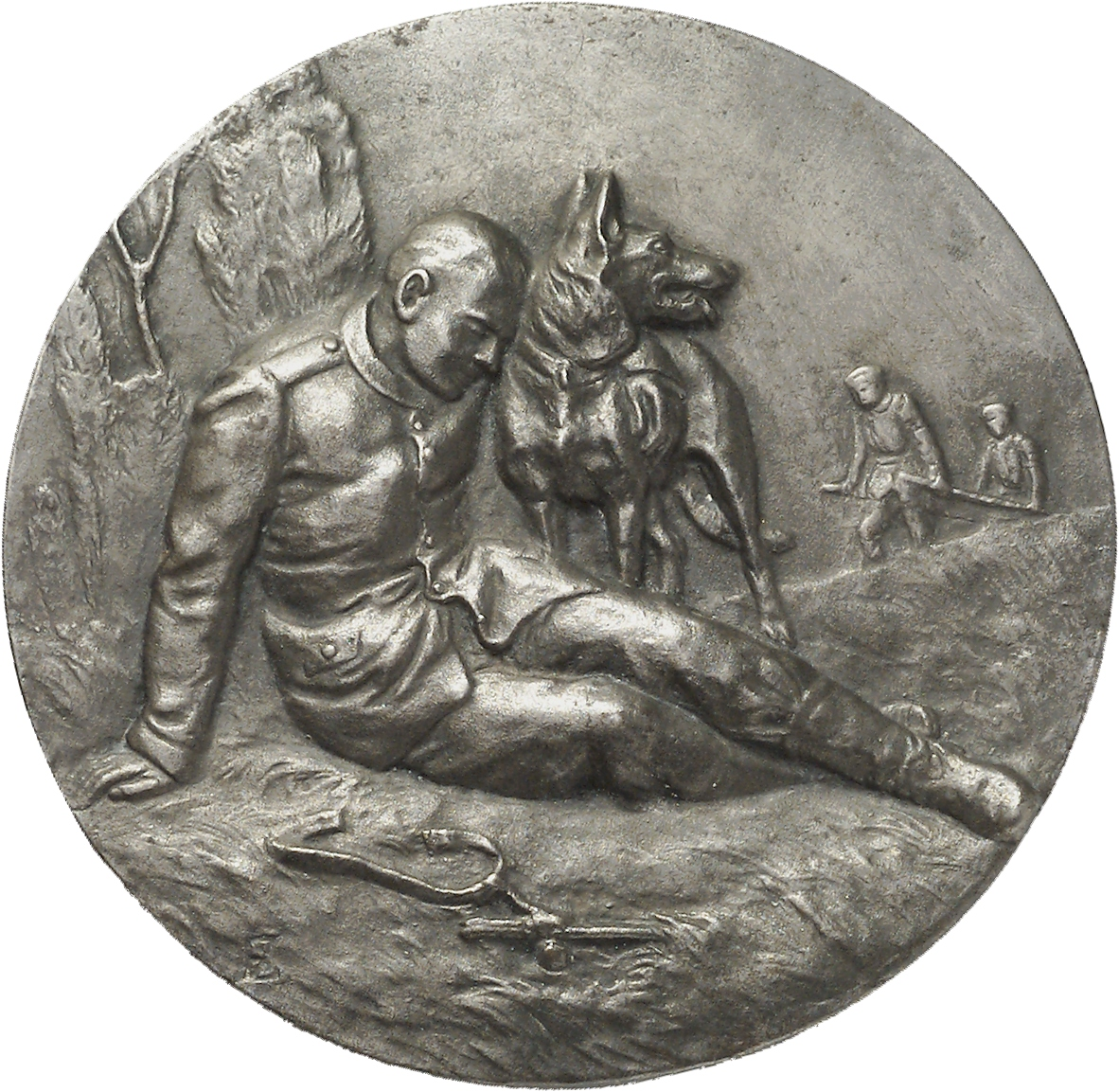
The faithful friend and helper in need- Reverse

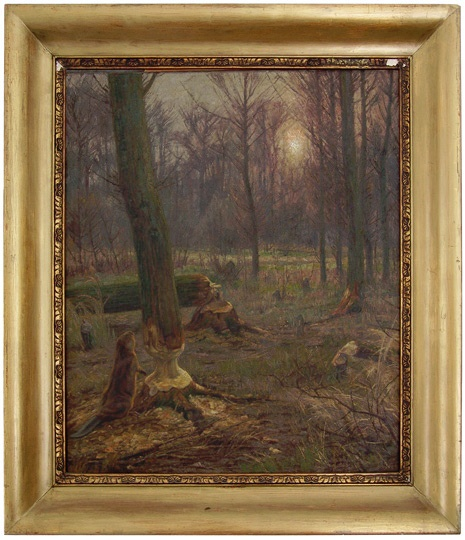
Biber am angeschnittenen Stamm- Beaver on a Cut Trunk. From the Salzlandmuseum

== Literature ==
Floericke, Kurt. Aussterbende Tiere (Biber/Nerz/Luchs/Uhu), Franckh’sche Verlagshandlung, Stuttgart 1927, S. 12 und S. 29.

Heck, Ludwig. Dt. Tierbildner: E. Z., in: Weber’s Illustrierte Zeitung 158, 1922, 74 (6 Abb.)

Luchs, Fritz. E. Z., in: Zeitschrift Der Heger, 1923, 961–965

Wild und Hund 19, Nr. 2, 1913 (Abb.)

Zehle, Ernst. Rettet den Biber!, Zeitschrift Der Heger, Jg. 1924, Heft 18, S. 969–971

Zornow, Frank. Ernst Zehle – Streiflichter aus dem Leben eines Berliner Künstlers und Naturfreundes, Zeitschrift Naturschutz- und Naturparke, Heft 138 [1990], S. 19–23.
