= Louis Riché =

French sculptor

Louis Riché (29 May 1877 Paris - 1949), was a French sculptor in bronze.

"His first exhibit at the Salon in Paris was in 1896 at the age of nineteen. Riché sculpted many animals subjects but his favorite models were German Shepherd dogs at which he is considered the master at reproducing. He continued exhibiting at the Salon and except for the interruptions of both World Wars he continued to create his artistic subjects. He worked mostly with the Thiebault Freres foundry for the casting of his models but it is noted that some of his sculptures of lions were cast in silver by Risler and Carre."
