= Christopher Fratin =

French sculptor

Christophe Fratin
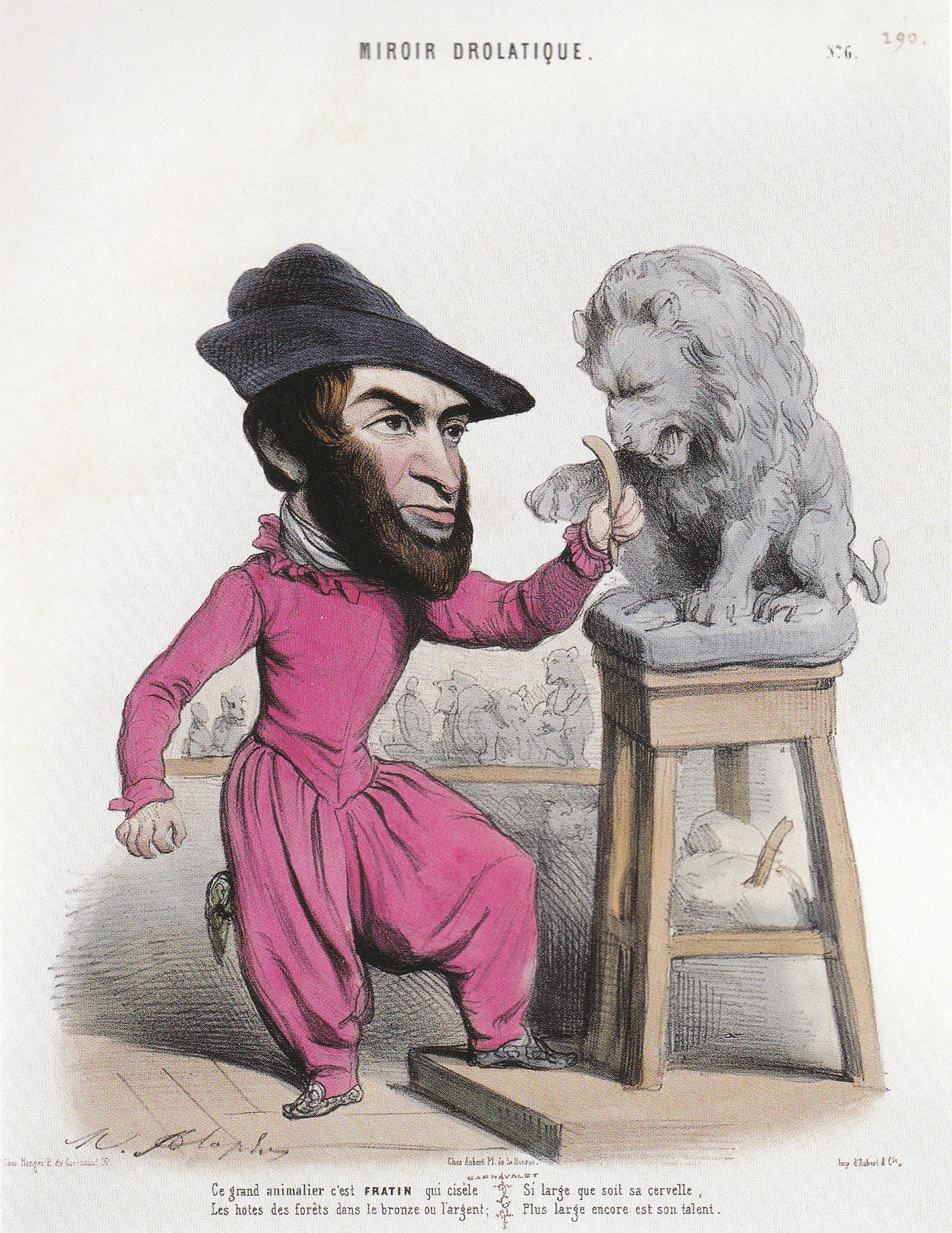
- A lithograph of Fratin with Lion Fighting a Snake
- Born: Christopher Fratin; 1 January 1801; Metz, Moselle, France
- Died: 16 August 1864 (aged 63); Le Raincy, Seine-Saint-Denis, France
- Known for: Sculpture
- Notable work: Eagles and Prey (in Central Park, NYC)
- Movement: Animalier

Christopher Fratin (1 January 1801 – 16 August 1864), also known as Christophe Fratin, was a French sculptor in the animalier style, and one of the earliest French sculptors to portray animals in bronze.

== Early life ==
Fratin was born in Metz, Moselle, France the son of a taxidermist. He first studied drawing under Pioche in Metz and later worked in Paris at the studio of Théodore Géricault.

== Work ==
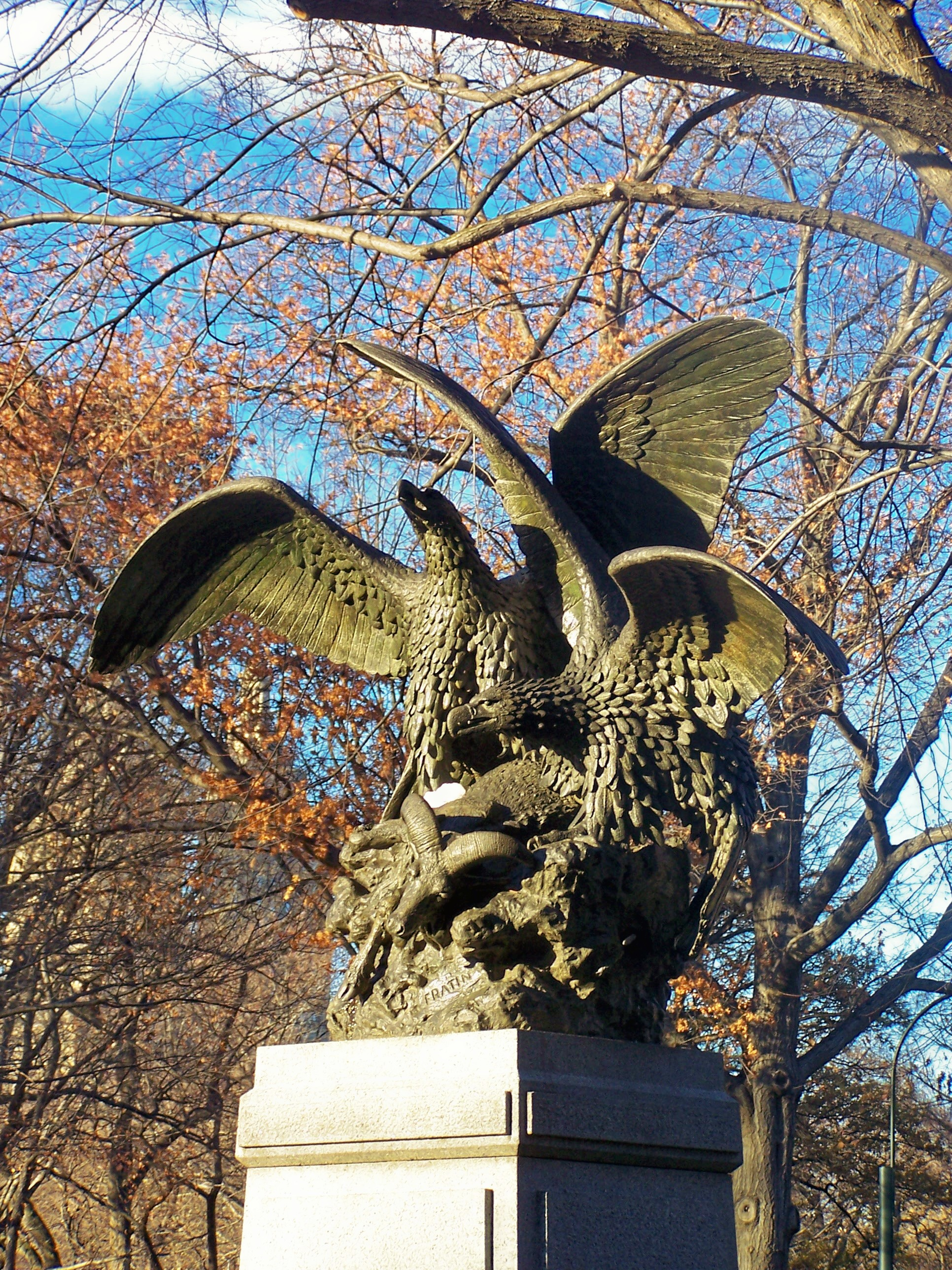
Eagles and Prey by Fratin, Central Park, New York City

He exhibited at the Paris Salon from 1831 to 1842 and 1850–1862, as well as at the Great Exhibition in London in 1851. Fratin never signed his bronzes but instead used a stamp showing his last name in straight block letters. One of the stamps he used (pictured) showed the "n" reversed, not by design but due to an error on the part of the maker of the stamp. Bronzes bearing this stamp have the appearance of not seeming to be genuine when in reality they are.

Fratin received monumental commissions in France and elsewhere, including the Deux Aigles Gardant Leur Proie (Eagles and Prey, created 1850) displayed since 1863 in New York City's Central Park. Many of his small bronzes—including his miniature bronzes which were more affordable due to their smaller size—were sold commercially to the general public during his lifetime. Today, Fratin's sculpture is on permanent display in the Louvre, the city museums of Metz, Lyon, Strasbourg, Nîmes and at the Peabody Institute in Baltimore, Maryland. The Georg Eisler archive in Vienna also has on display works by Fratin.

A number of Fratin's pieces portray horses, especially portraits of famous horses such as Fermer, cheval anglais pur-sang, a wax of which he debuted at the Salon of 1831, the same exhibition in which Barye's Tigre dévorant un gavial was featured.

At Montrouge Square in Paris appears a colossal bronze group standing 2 meters high entitled Cheval attaqué par un lion, executed in 1852. Fratin received many commissions from the State including groups designed for the botanical garden and the esplanade of his hometown; amongst the groups were two dogs, a deer at bay, a purebred horse, and some eagles. He also produced a number of whimsical bear sculptures, one being Ours jouant de la cornemuse which shows a bear holding a musical instrument.

== Death and legacy ==
Fratin died on 17 August 1864 at Le Raincy (Seine-Saint-Denis) and is buried in Montmartre Cemetery. He is honored in Metz where a street is named after him.

== Photo gallery ==
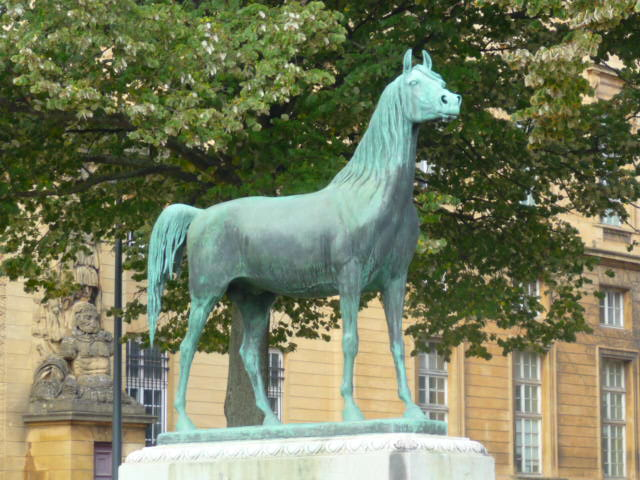
Monumental Horse c. 1850, in Metz, France

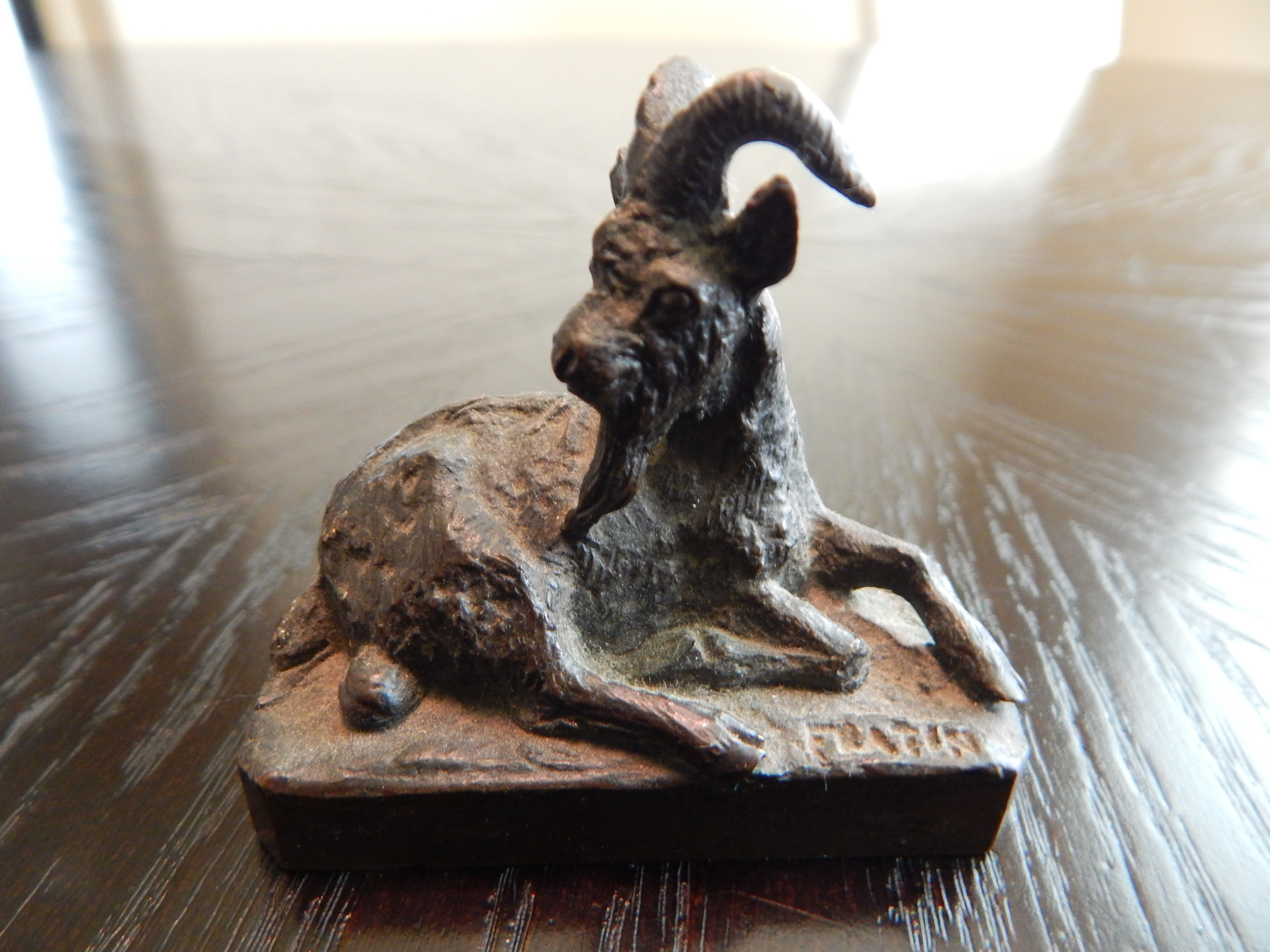
A miniature bronze of a goat by Fratin, c. 1840

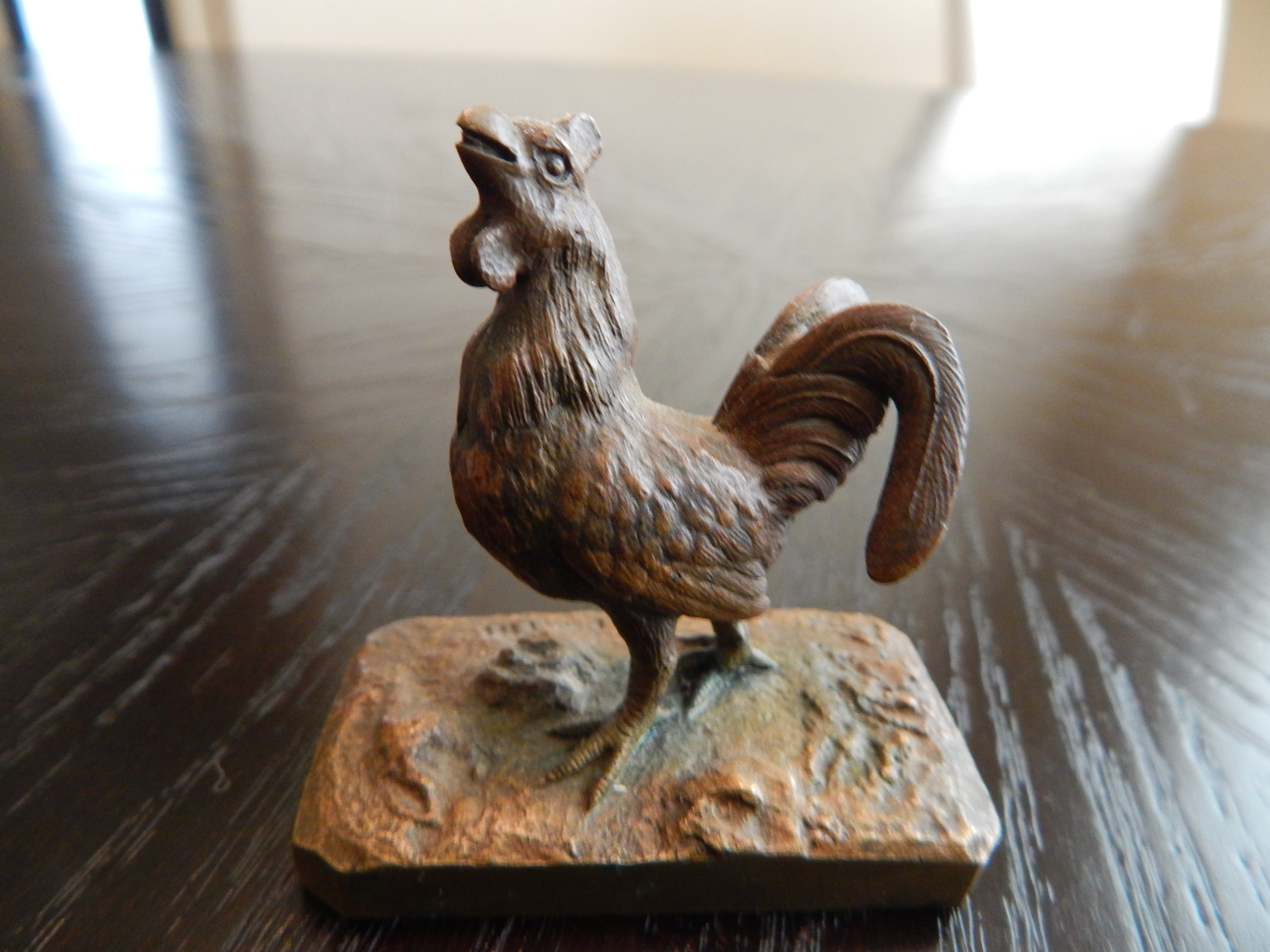
A miniature bronze of a rooster by Fratin, c. 1840

Reversed "N" stamp used by Fratin

== Bibliography ==
- Michel Poletti, Alain Richarme, Fratin : objets décoratifs & sculptures romantiques, Paris : Univers du bronze sculptures XIXe & XXe, 2000. ISBN 2-9507001-2-8.
- Jane Horswell, Les Animaliers, 1971.
- James Mackay, The Animaliers, 1973.
- Christopher Payne, Animals in Bronze, 1986.
- Pierre Kjellberg, Bronzes of the 19th Century, 1994.
- George Savage, A Concise History of Bronzes, 1968.
- E. Benezit, Dictionnaire des Peintres et Sculpteurs, 1966.
- Stanaslas Lami, Dictionnaire de Sculpteurs de l'ecole Francaise, 1914.
