= Pierre-Jules Mêne =

French sculptor

Pierre-Jules Mène
- Born: 25 March 1810; Paris, France
- Died: 21 May 1879 (aged 69); Paris, France
- Known for: Sculpture
- Notable work: L'Accolade; Cerf à la branche; Ibrahim, cheval arabe
- Movement: Animalier

Pierre-Jules Mêne (French pronunciation: [pjɛʁ ʒyl mɛn]; 25 March 1810 – 20 May 1879) was a French sculptor and animalier. He is considered one of the pioneers of animal sculpture in the nineteenth century.

== Early life ==
Mêne was born on 25 March 1810 in Paris, France. As a teenager he worked for his father, a metal turner. By 1837 he was casting his bronze sculptures in his own foundry.

== Career ==
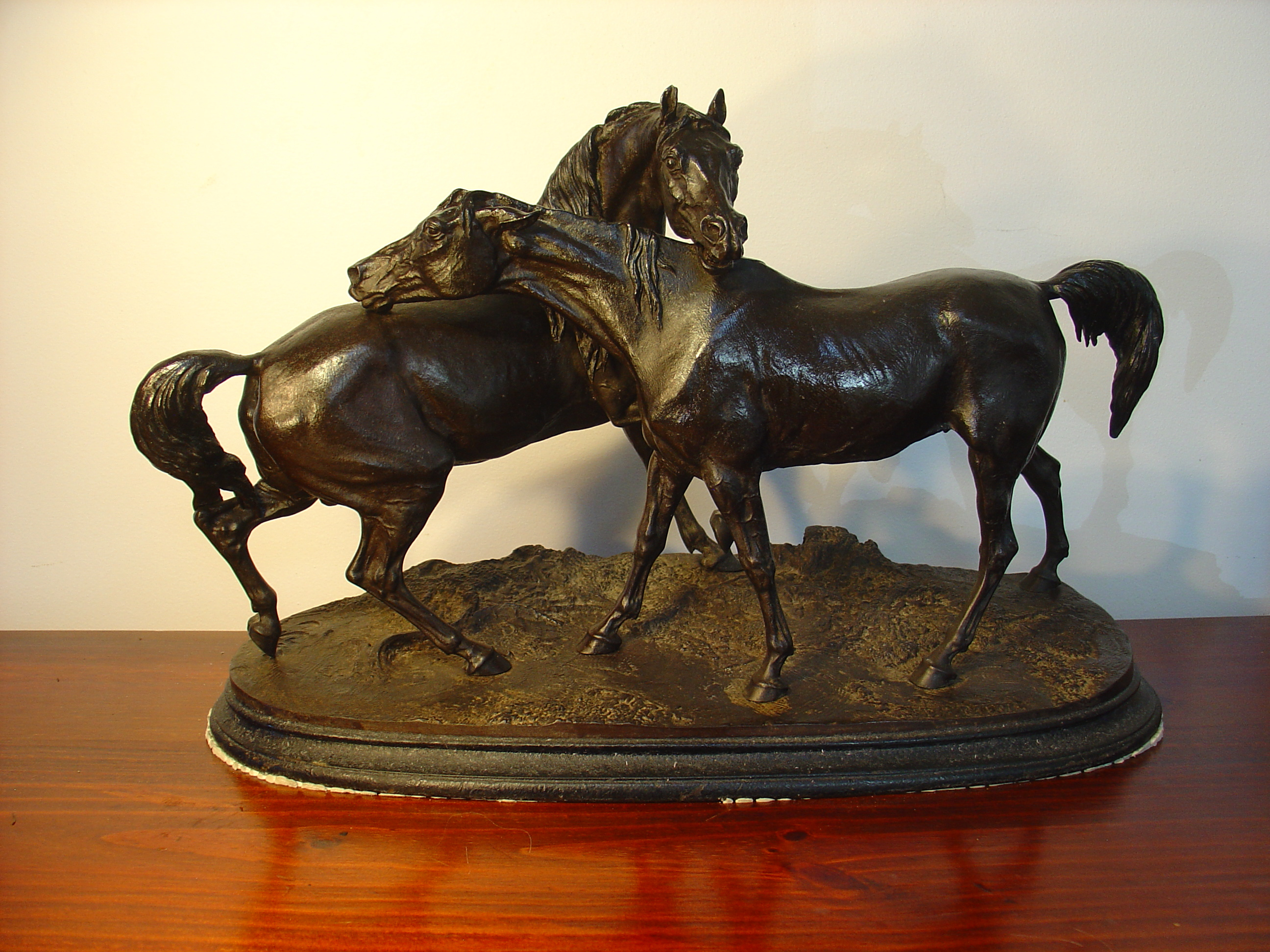
The Accolade by Pierre-Jules Mêne (1851)—iron version of unknown origin

Mêne produced a number of animal sculptures, mainly of domestic animals including horses, cows and bulls, sheep and goats which were in vogue during the Second Empire. He was one of a school of French animalières which also included Rosa Bonheur, Paul-Edouard Delabrierre, Pierre Louis Rouillard, Antoine-Louis Barye, his son Alfred, son-in-law Auguste Caïn and François Pompon.

His work was first shown in London by Ernest Gambart in 1849. Mêne specialized in small bronze figures which explains why none of his works exist as public statuary. His work was a popular success with the bourgeois class and many editions of each sculpture were made, often to decorate private homes. The quality of these works is high, comparable to Barye's. Mêne enjoyed a longer period of success and celebrity than his contemporaries. He is considered to have been the lost-wax casting expert of his time. The lost-wax casting method is sometimes referred to as the cire perdue method.

=== Copies, forgeries and reproductions ===
Because Mêne was so prolific and because so many editions of his works were made, his work is sometimes undervalued in the current market, and forgeries and reproductions of his works abound. However, original pieces cast during his lifetime continue to bring good prices at auction. Russian foundries are known to have copied Mêne's work. These castings can be recognized by the appearance of a small plaque, inscribed in Cyrillic, most often found on the underside of the base of the sculpture.

After Mène's death in 1879, the Susse Freres foundry acquired the rights to reproduce his models and produced posthumous proofs marked "Susse foundeur éditeur, Paris".

== Death and legacy ==
Mêne died on 20 May 1879 in Paris, France. He is remembered as one of the finest, and certainly the most prolific, animalier sculptors of all time.

== Notes ==
There are no known photographs or portraits of Mêne.

== Gallery ==
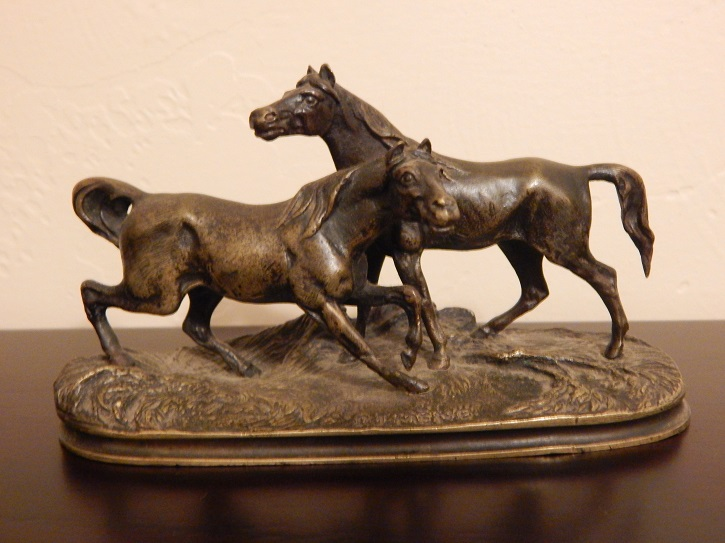
Miniature bronze of horses by Mêne, c. 1850

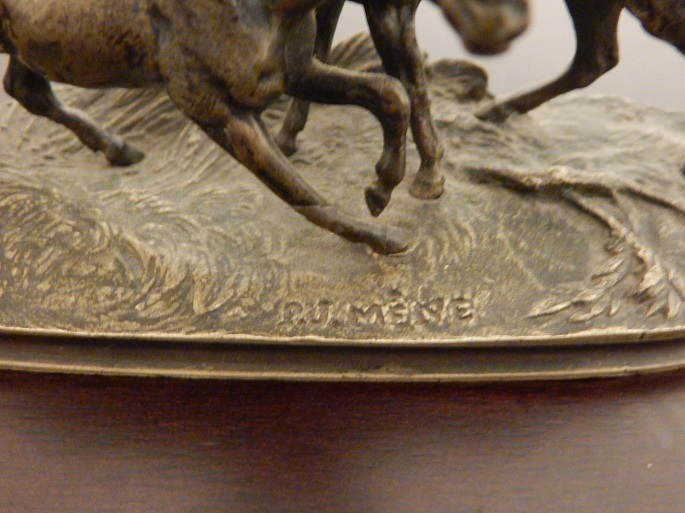
P. J. Mêne signature

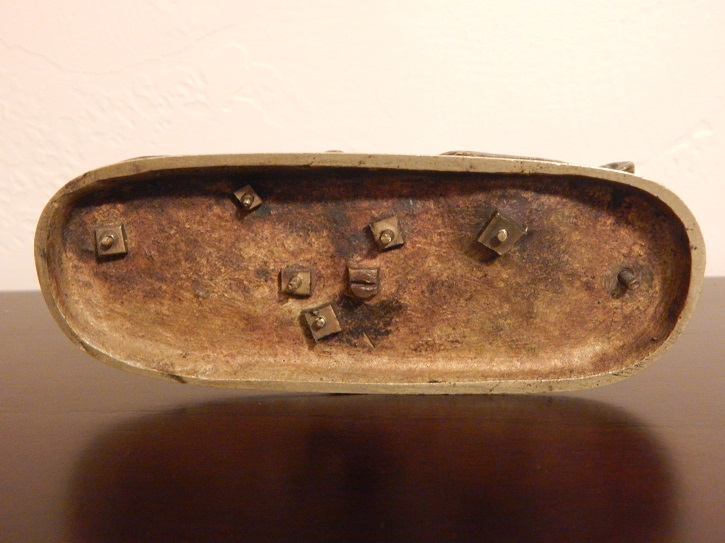
Underside of an antique bronze by Mêne, c. 1850. Note the hand-cut bronze square nuts that were used during the mid-to-late 19th century.

== Bibliography ==
- Catalogue raisonné of Pierre-Jules Mêne by Michel Poletti and Alain Richarme (Paris, 1998). Catalogues 240 models with a history of editions from 1838 to 1933; biography; context of life and work in Second Empire Paris (in French).
