= Pandora (disambiguation) =

Pandora is a character in Greek mythology, the first human woman created by the gods.

Pandora may also refer to:

== Mythology ==
- Pandora (mythology), the name of other characters in Greek mythology, including:
  - Pandora (daughter of Deucalion), daughter of King Deucalion and Pyrrha and granddaughter of the original Pandora
- Pandora's box, mythological artifact connected with the myth of Pandora

== Places ==
=== Extraterrestrial ===
- Pandora (moon), one of the satellites of Saturn
- 55 Pandora, an asteroid

=== Terrestrial ===
- Pandora, Colorado, an unincorporated community in the US
- Pandora, Ohio, a village in the US
- Pandora, Pennsylvania, an unincorporated community in the US
- Pandora, Texas, an unincorporated community in the US
- Pandora Island, Nunavut, Canada
- Pandora – The World of Avatar, a themed area at Disney's Animal Kingdom, Walt Disney World
- Pandora Reef, Queensland, Australia
- Pandora River, Fiordland, New Zealand
- Pandora's or Pandoras Pass, a mountain pass in New South Wales, Australia
- Pandora, Punjab, a village in Pakistan also known as Pindorah
- Pandora Islet, part of Ducie Island in the South Pacific Ocean
- Pandora mine, which supplied Klondyke mill in the Gwydyr Forest of north Wales in the UK
- Pandora Spire, a rock Needle in Victoria Land, Antarctica

== People ==
- Pandora (singer), Swedish Eurodance artist
- Edith Hyde Robbins Macartney, American clairvoyant, known by the pseudonym "Pandora"
- Stefania Zahorska, Polish writer, known by the pseudonym "Pandora"
- Pandora Boxx, American drag queen and comedian
- Pandora Clifford, British actress
- Pandora Gibson, Bahamian comedian, storyteller and actress
- Pandora Peaks, retired exotic dancer

== Arts, entertainment, and media ==
=== Fictional entities and places ===
- Pandora (Avatar), a fictional moon, and the setting for James Cameron's Avatar film and video game
- Pandora (comics), a comic book character from Avatar Press
- Pandora (DC Comics), a comic book interpretation of her namesake in Greek mythology
- Pandora (Re:Zero), a character in the light novel series Re:Zero − Starting Life in Another World
- Pandora, the main character in the anime Because I'm the Goddess
- Pandora, the barren planet of the Borderlands universe
- Pandora, the artificially-created human key to opening Pandora's Box in God of War III
- Pandora, a character in the Guitar Hero series of video games
- Pandora, an antagonist in the anime Futari wa Pretty Cure (originally named Poisony)
- Pandora, a character in the Kid Icarus series of video games
- Pandora, one of the antagonists in the Mega Man ZX series
- Pandora, a fictional planet in the Noon Universe by Soviet authors Arkady and Boris Strugatsky
- Pandora, the sister of the god Hades in the Saint Seiya anime and manga series
- Pandora, a fictional planet created by Frank Herbert, first introduced in The Jesus Incident
- Pandora Braithwaite, a fictional character in the Adrian Mole books
- Pandora Moon, a fictional character in the British drama Skins
- Pandora Pann, a DC Comics character
- Pandora the Brat, a character in the children's series The Electric Company
- Pandora, a character in The Vampire Chronicles novel series
- Pandora, a character in the Gallifrey Doctor Who audio drama series
- Pandora, a character in the Pandora comic strip in the magazine Kerrang!
- Pandora, the main protagonist of the indie video game Mindwave

=== Film and television ===
- Pandora (2016 film), a South Korean film
- Pandora (TV series), a 2019 sci-fi television series
- "Pandora" (Skins episode), an episode of the teen drama Skins
- "Pandora" (Smallville episode), an episode from the 9th season of the superhero series Smallville
- Pandora Film, a German film producer and distributor
- Pandora International, an English producer of telecine controllers and film colour correction tools

=== Gaming ===
- Pandora (console), a hand held video game console with open-source software
- Pandora (Interceptor Software), a game publishing label established in 1986
- Pandora, a video game released in 1988 on the Amiga and Atari ST, by Firebird Games
- Pandora: First Contact, a 2013 4X game
- Avatar: Frontiers of Pandora, a 2023 action-adventure game

=== Literature ===
- Pandora (Rice novel), by Anne Rice in The Vampire Chronicles
- Pandora (Cooper novel), by Jilly Cooper
- Pandora, a novel by Sylvia Fraser based on her own childhood
- "Pandora", a short story by Henry James, published in 1884
- Pandora, a drama fragment by Johann Wolfgang von Goethe
- Pandora, by Holly Hollander, a novel by Gene Wolfe
- Pandora, a comic strip in the magazine Kerrang!
- Pandora, a book series from Insel Verlag (1920-1921)
- Pandora Press, UK feminist publishing imprint founded in 1983

=== Music ===
==== Groups ====
- Pandora (group), a Mexican music group
- Pandora (musical duo), a Japanese electronic music duo
- The Pandoras, an all-female rock and roll band from Los Angeles, California

==== Albums ====
- Pandora (Angela Zhang album), 2006
- Pandora (SiM album), 2013
- Pandora (Kara EP), 2012
- Pandora (Wisp EP), 2024
- Pandora, 2007 compilation album by D'erlanger

==== Songs ====
- "Pandora", a song by Madina Lake from From Them, Through Us, to You
- "Pandora", a song by Róisín Murphy, the B-side of her single "You Know Me Better"
- "Pandora", a song by Parkway Drive from Killing with a Smile
- "Pandora (For Cindy)", a song by the Cocteau Twins from Treasure
- "潘朵拉" (Pandora)", a song by Angela Zhang on Pandora
- "Pandora", a song by SiM on Pandora
- "Pandora", a song by Kara on Pandora
- "Pandora", a song by Al Stewart on his 1981 album Live/Indian Summer

==== Other uses in music ====
- Pandora (service), a music streaming service
- Pandora, alternate spelling for the bandora, a stringed musical instrument

=== Other uses in arts and entertainment, and media ===
- Pandora (painting), a c. 1896 painting by John William Waterhouse
- Pandora (sculpture), an 1819 marble by Jean-Pierre Cortot
- "Pandora", episode 2.3 of the Gallifrey Doctor Who audio drama series

== Biological organisms ==
- Pandora (fungus), a genus of fungi
- Pandora, an invalid name of the butterfly genus Panacea, established by Doubleday around 1848
- Pandora (bivalve), a genus of bivalves in the family Pandoridae
- Pandora moth (Coloradia pandora)
- Pandoras, several ray-finned fish species in the genus Pagellus

== Technology ==
- Pandora (marketplace), a defunct darknet marketplace
- Pandora archive, an online archive run by the National Library of Australia
- Pandora FMS, software for monitoring computer networks
- HMS Pandora, several ships of the Royal Navy
- Pandora, a civil transport version of the Argentine DINFIA IA 35 1950s airplane
- Pandora, a HBC vessel operated by the Hudson's Bay Company from 1846–1851
- Pandora Mission, space telescope for NASA

== Other uses ==
- Pandora Papers, a leak of over 11.9 million documents pertaining to offshore finance
- Pandora (doll), a French fashion doll in the 17th and 18th centuries
- Pandora (jewelry), a global jewelry manufacturing company founded in Denmark
- Operation PANDORA, 1971 KGB plan
- Pandora, the yearbook of the Washington & Jefferson College, Washington, Pennsylvania
- USCGC Pandora, a US Coast Guard patrol boat

== See also ==
- Pandora Project (disambiguation)
- Pandora's box (disambiguation)
- Pandor, a surname
- Pandorica, a prison in the Doctor Who universe
