= Rouillard =

Rouillard may refer to:

- Carole Rouillard (born 1960), Canadian long-distance runner
- Pierre Louis Rouillard (1820–1881), French sculptor
