= Die Büchse der Pandora =

Die Büchse der Pandora may refer to:

- Pandora's Box (play), a 1904 play by Frank Wedekind
- Pandora's Box (1929 film), an adaptation of the play, by G. W. Pabst

== See also ==
- Pandora's box (disambiguation)
