= Pandor =

Pandor is a surname. Notable people with this surname include:

- Danish Pandor, Indian actor who starred in Agent Raghav – Crime Branch and Dhurandhar
- Dominique Pandor (born 1993), Martiniquais footballer
- Miriam Pandor (1924-2016), German dancer and choreographer
- Naledi Pandor (born 1953), South African academic and politician
- Solly Pandor (1957/58-2016), Zambian football manager
- Yannick Pandor (born 2001), French footballer

== See also ==
- Pandora (disambiguation)
