= Jean-Pierre Cortot =

French neoclassical sculptor (1787–1843)

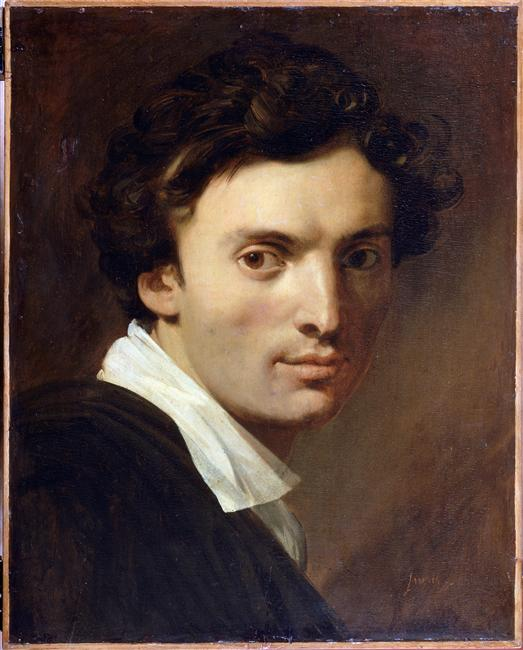
- Portrait by Ingres, 1815
- Born: 20 August 1787; Paris, France
- Died: 12 August 1843 (aged 55); Paris, France

Jean-Pierre Cortot (English: /kɔːrˈtoʊ/ kor-TOH, French: [ʒɑ̃ pjɛʁ kɔʁto]; 20 August 1787 – 12 August 1843) was a French neoclassical sculptor.

== Life ==
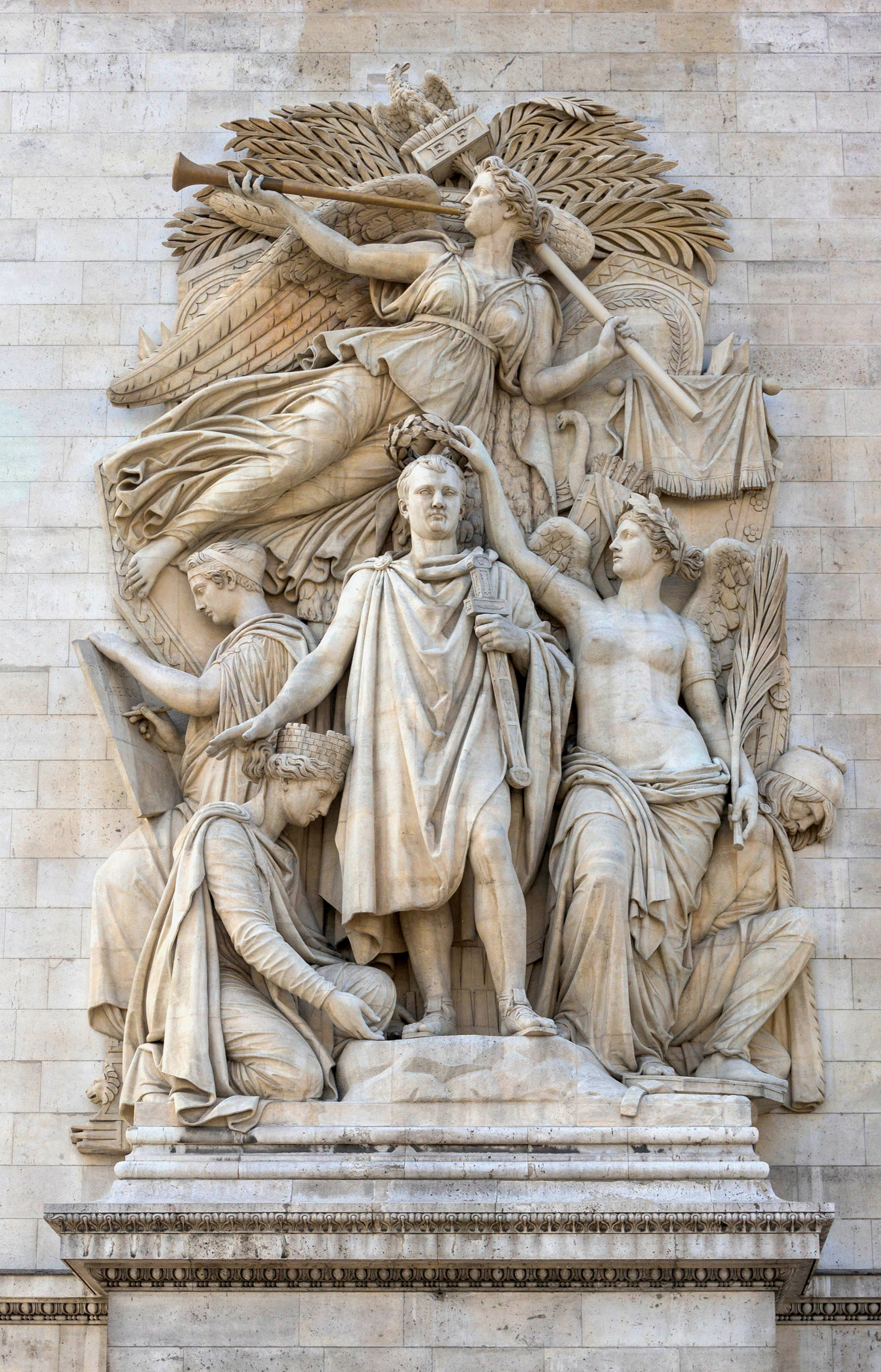
Le Triomphe de 1810, sculpted group on the Arc de Triomphe, Paris

Cortot was born and died in Paris. He was educated at the École des Beaux Arts in Paris, and won the Prix de Rome in 1809, residing in the Villa Medici in Rome from 1810 to 1813.

Cortot worked in an austere, correct, academic neo-classical style, heir to both classic French models from the late 18th century and the Greco-Roman tradition. His art took on a more romantic expression toward the end of his life.

Appointed a professor at the École, succeeding Charles Dupaty, he was made a member of the Académie des beaux-arts in 1825, again replacing Dupaty. He was made an Officer of the Légion d'honneur in 1841.

Among his students were Joseph-Marius Ramus, Jean-Jacques Feuchère, Pierre-Charles Simart, Jean-Auguste Barre, and the animalier Pierre Louis Rouillard. A street in Montmartre bears his name, and Cortot's grave can be found in Père Lachaise Cemetery.

== Early works and works completed in Rome ==
Source: WikiPhidias

Winning the Prix de Rome entitled him to study at the Académie de France in Rome and whilst there he completed several works which were sent back to Paris. He remained in Rome for 5 years.

- Melpomène. Part of a "surtout" or table decoration. Executed 1808. Held by the Sèvres Cité de la Céramique.
- La contemplation céleste This 1820 piece is held by the Beaux-arts de Paris, l'école nationale supérieure and was created by Cortot for a competition organised by the school called "Tête d'expression".
- Déïdamie. Part of a "surtout" or table decoration. Executed 1812. Held by the Sèvres Cité de la Céramique.
- Pandora. Marble work dating to 1819 now held in the Musée des Beaux-arts de Lyon.
- Narcisse debout. Marble work dated 1818 held in the Musée des Beaux-arts of Angers. Was shown at the Salon des artistes français in 1814
- Un jeune pêcheur. Rome.
- Hyacinthe blessé. Rome.
- Napoléon 1er. Cortot only completed the plaster model. The project was abandoned when the Empire fell.
- Phaéton se plaignant à sa mère de l'insulte qu'il a reçue d'Epaphus. Rome.
- Ulysse, sous le costume d'un mendiant, racontant ses aventures à Pénélope. Rome.
- Un soldat combattant. Rome.
- Bust of the painter Guillaume Guillon-Lethière. Rome. 1813.
- Louis XVIII. Rome. 1816 à 1817.
- Un philosophe. Rome.

== Works after Rome ==
Source: WikiPhidias

Name	Location	Date	Notes
Bust of Eustache of Saint-Pierre	Musée des Beaux-arts de Calais.	1820	Bust of one of the so-called "Burghers of Calais".
Arc de Triomphe du Carrousel		1820	A bas-relief, depicting "Entrevue du roi d'Espagne et du duc d'Angoulême au port Sainte-Marie", was completed by Cortot for the arc's façade. It was deposited with the Louvre but has disappeared. The work was submitted to the Paris Salon of 1827.
Equestrian statue of Louis XIII of France.	Place des Vosges Paris	1821	In 1639 Cardinal de Richelieu instructed that a bronze statue should be erected in the middle of the place Royale (renamed Place des Vosges), partly to help stop the location being used for dueling. The sculptor Pierre II Biard used a cast of a horse intended for a statue of Henri II on which he placed an effigy of Louis XIII which by all accounts was proportionately too big for the horse. The bronze was melted down during the French Revolution for the production of cannons. In 1825 a new statue was erected, this a white marble work which Cortot had based on a model by Charles Dupaty executed in 1816.
Corneille	Hôtel de Ville, Rouen	1822	Cortot's white marble statue stands in the Hôtel de Ville's "Hall d'honneur" . The work was exhibited at the Paris Salon of 1822.
Saint-Nicolas-du-Chardonnet-Statue of Christ	Paris	1822	See "Liste des œuvres classées à Saint-Nicolas-du-Chardonnet".
Monument Malesherbes	Paris-Palais de Justice	1825	Work in marble by Bosio depicts Malesherbes with allegories for France and Fidelty. In bas-reliefs below, Cortot depicts Louis XVI visiting Sèze, Malesherbes and Tronchet in prison.
La Résurrection du Christ	Suresnes	1825	Interior Chapelle du Mont-Valérien
Marie Antoinette soutenue par la Religion	Chapelle Expiatoire, Paris		This work is held in the Chapelle Expiatoire in Paris. The Musée du Louvre holds the original plaster model
Ecce Homo	Église Saint-Gervais-Saint-Protais, Paris		
Sainte Catherine	Église de Saint-Gervais et de Saint-Protais, Paris		This work was shown at the 1822 Paris Salon.
Notre-Dame de la Garde	Marseille	1827	Cortot's plaster model of the Virgin Mary and Child was used by Jean-Baptiste Chanuel as the basis for his silver statue. The plaster model was shown at the 1827 Salon.
Apollon	Bordeaux Musée des Beaux-arts		This work was finished off by Cortot after the death of Lemot
Bust of Julie Duvidal	Beaux-arts de Paris, l'école nationale supérieure	1824	Work in plaster
Bust of Charles Dupaty		1825	There is a plaster copy of this bust in the Musée d'Aquitaine. The marble version is to be seen in the Bordeaux Musée des Beaux-Arts.
Ganymède	Musée des Beaux-arts d'Angers.		Marble statue depicts Ganymède and Jupiter.
La Paix et L'Abondance	The Louvre	1824	This sculpture can be seen in the Pavillon Marengo - Aile Nord. It was shown at the Paris Salon of 1824
Daphnis and Chloe	The Louvre-Department of Sculptures, Richelieu, ground floor, Cour Puget	1827	This marble work was exhibited at the Paris Salon of 1827 and the plaster model was shown at the Salon 1824 to 1825.
Vierge	Arras		This marble statue is in Arras Cathedral.
Vierge à l'Enfant	Suresnes	1829	This limestone statue is located in the Église paroissiale du Coeur-Immaculé-de-Marie. Originally intended for the "chapelle du couvent des pères des missions du mont Valérien", but after a period in the Église paroissiale Saint-Leufroy it was eventually moved in 1908 to Suresnes.
Maréchal Jean Lannes, Duke of Montebello	Lectoure	1831	Statue of one of Napoleon's marshals shown at the Paris Salon in 1831
Le Soldat de Marathon annonçant la victoire	The Louvre-Department of Sculptures, Richelieu, ground floor, Cour Puget	1834.	This work in marble was subsequently cast in bronze by various foundries including Barbedienne. The plaster version was shown at the Paris Salon in 1822 and the marble version was shown in 1834.
Statues representing Brest and Rouen	Place de la Concorde	1836	Between 1833 and 1846, the architect Jacques Hittorff was charged with decorating the area around the central obelisk. He installed two fountains, the "Fontaine des fleuves" and the "Fontaine des mers" and eight statues representing the French cities of Brest, Rouen, Nantes, Bordeaux, Marseille, Lyon, Strasbourg, and Lille. The statues were placed on pedestals positioned at the corners of an octagon. Cortot executed the Brest and Rouen statues, James Pradier the statues representing Lille and Strasbourg, Louis Petitot those representing Lyon and Marseille, and Louis-Denis Caillouette for those representing Nantes and Bordeaux.
Galerie des Batailles		1839	Cortot's bust of Jean Baptiste Budes, Baron of Guébriant can be seen in the Château de Versailles' Galerie des Batailles.
Pieta	Destroyed	1840	This work was submitted to the Paris Salon of 1840. It was intended for the Église de Notre Dame de Lorette but destroyed in 1871.
La France entre la Liberté et l’Ordre public	Palais Bourbon, Paris	1838 to 1841	The full title of Cortot's bas-relief in the pediment over the Palais Bourbon is "La France, entre la Liberté et l'Ordre public, appelant à elle les génies du Commerce, de l'Agriculture, de la Paix, de la Guerre et de l'Éloquence". It bears the words "ICI, FRONTON TRIANGULAIRE DE LA FAÇADE NORD : LA FRANCE, DRAPÉE À L’ANTIQUE, DEBOUT DEVANT SON TRÔNE, ACCOMPAGNÉE DE LA FORCE ET DE LA JUSTICE, APPELLE L’ÉLITE À LA CONFECTION DES LOIS, ŒUVRE DE JEAN-PIERRE CORTOT" The building is the seat of the French National Assembly, the lower legislative chamber of the French government. Cortot's work replaced the previous sculpture by Evariste Fragonard.
Tomb of Casimir Perier	Père Lachaise		A large mausoleum was constructed for Casimir Perier in 1837 and it has a statue of Perier by Cortot, who also executed three bas-reliefs on the statue's pedestal representing "l'Éloquence", "la Justice" and "la Force".
Pieta and two angels	Paris		This statue is located in Paris' Église Saint-Gervais-Saint-Protais. A combined work of both Cortot and Charles-François Leboeuf-Nanteuil. Cortot sculpted the Pieta and Leboeuf-Nanteuil the two angels.
Christ	Église Saint-Nicolas-du-Chardonnet, Paris		
Arc de Triomphe	Paris	1833	"Le Triomphe de 1810" celebrates the Treaty of Schönbrunn. This group features Napoleon, crowned by the goddess of Victory. The Arc de Triomphe was intended to honour the victory of Napoleon's army at Austerlitz and in fact became a monument celebrating all his achievements. The architects Chalgrin, Joust and Blouet were charged with the monument's design and Cortot, François Rude, Antoine Etex and Pradier were chosen to carry out the sculptural work involved. The Arc de Triomphe has three arches and the main hauts-relief are positioned on its four pillars. François Rude's "le Départ des Volontaires" and Cortot's "Le Triomphe de Napoléon" face the Champs Elysées, and Etex's "La République" and "La Paix" face the Avenue de la Grande Armée. Above these hauts-reliefs are six bas-reliefs recalling the battle of Austerlitz, the funeral of Marceau, the taking of Alexandria, the battle of Jemmapes, the passage of the pont d'Arcole and the battle of Aboukir.
L'Immortalité	The Louvre: Département des Sculptures	1835	The work was intended to replace the cross on the dome of the Panthéon. Corot created a full-scale model in 1835 which was placed in an apse in the Panthéon in 1845, but destroyed in the June uprising of the French Revolution of 1848. In 1860 the Louvre acquired this bronze based on the original drawing by Cortot, and cast by Thiébaut in 1859.

== Gallery of images ==
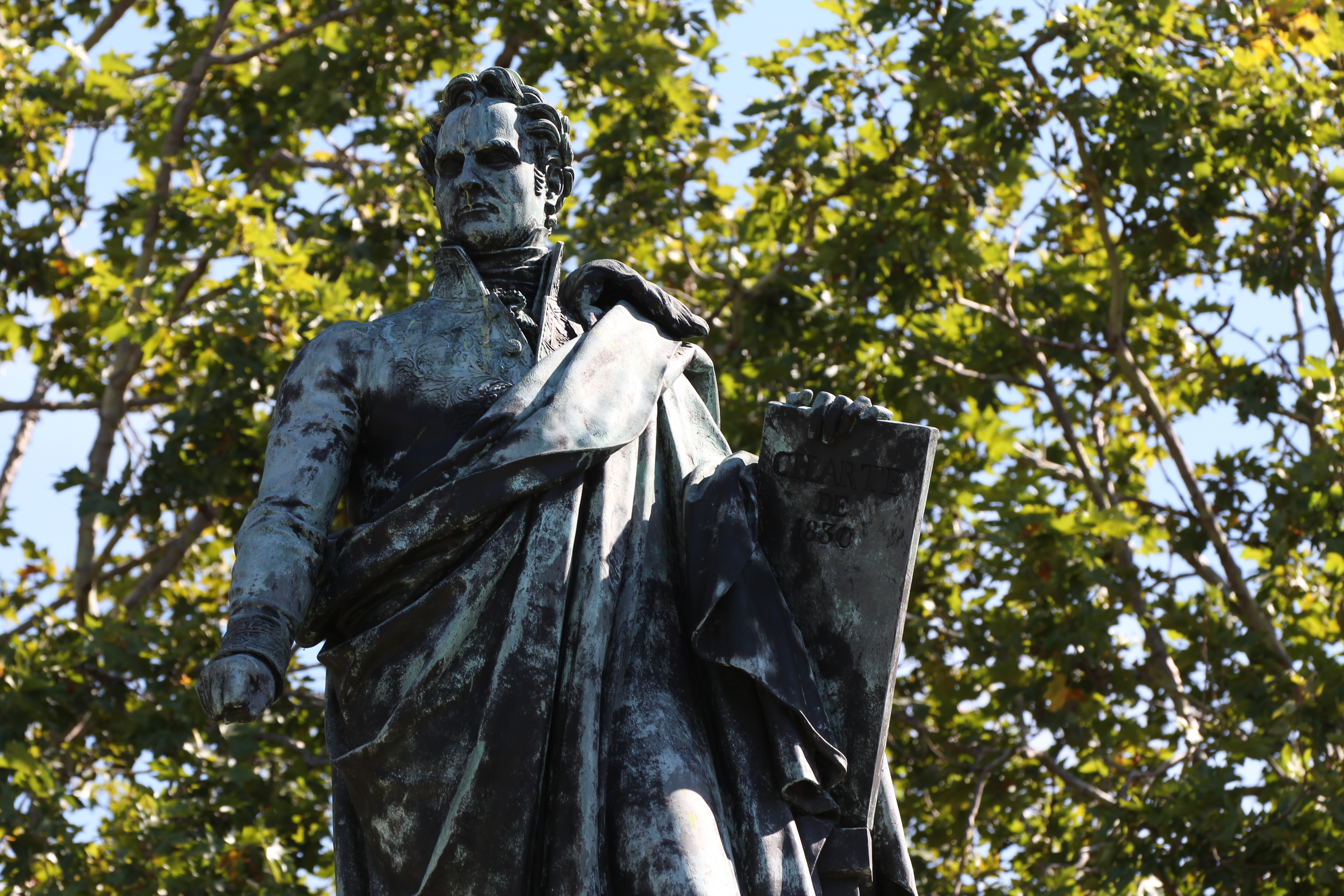
Tomb of Casimir Périer

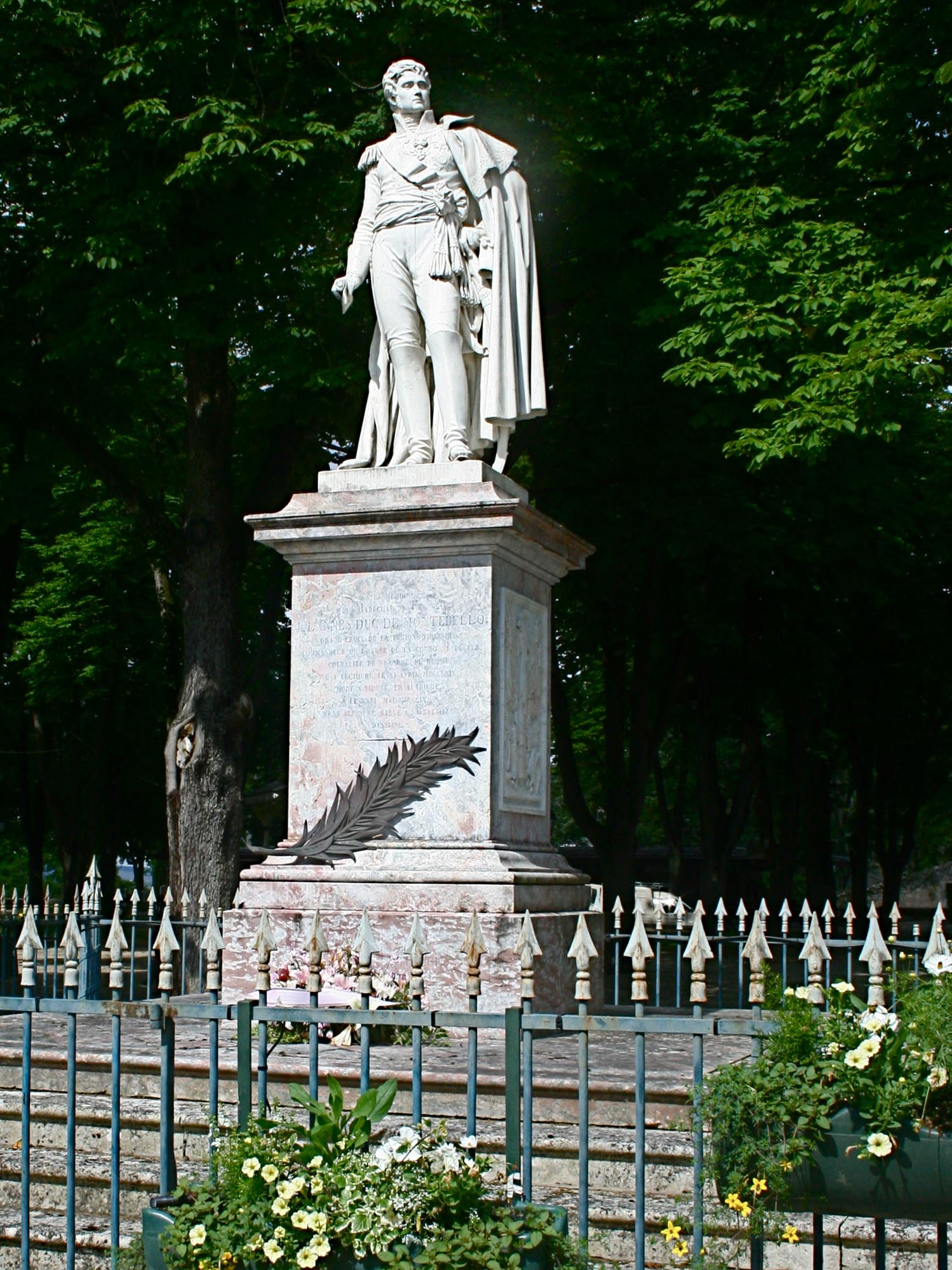
Maréchal Lannes

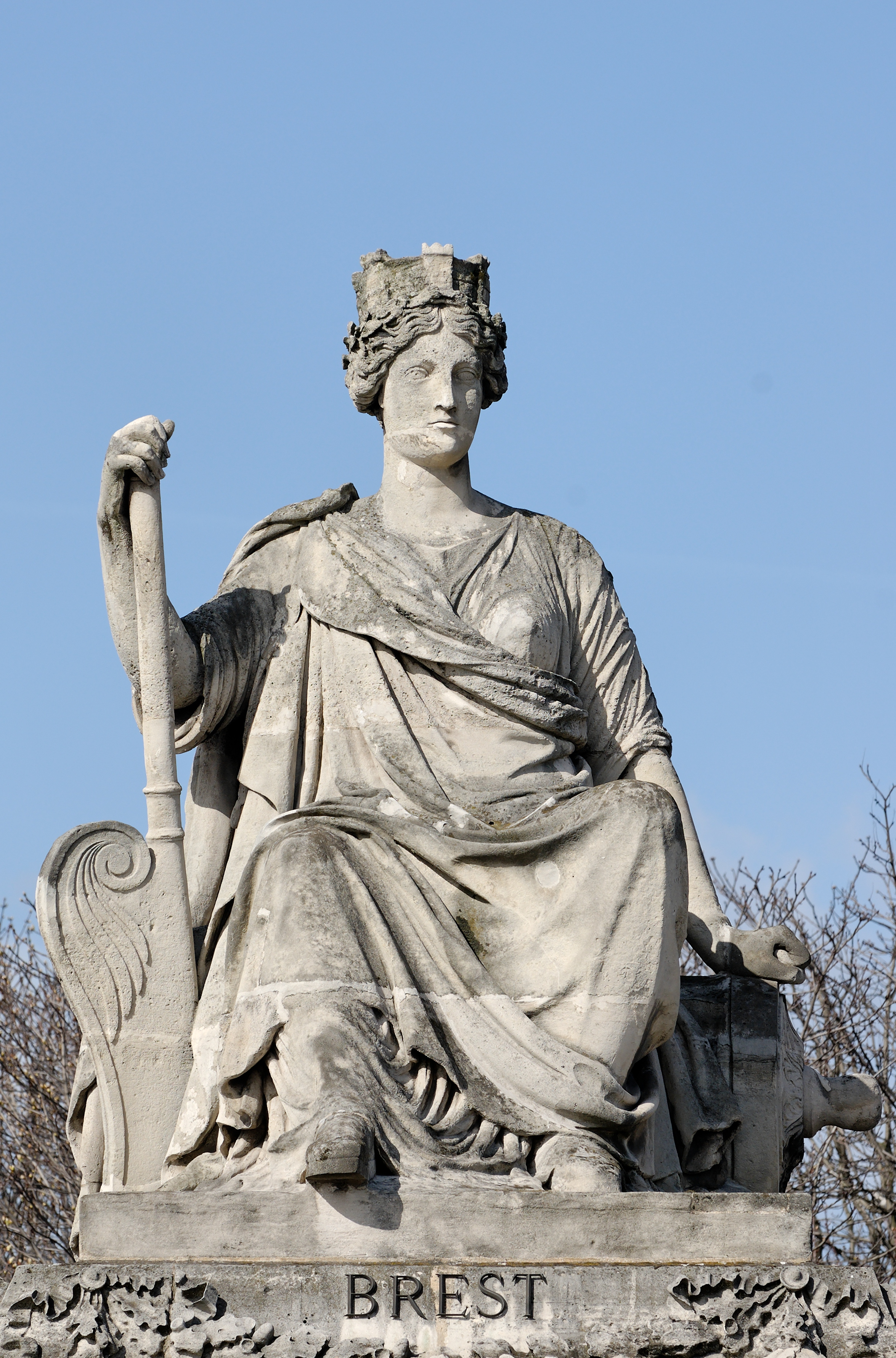
The statue Brest in Place de la Concorde

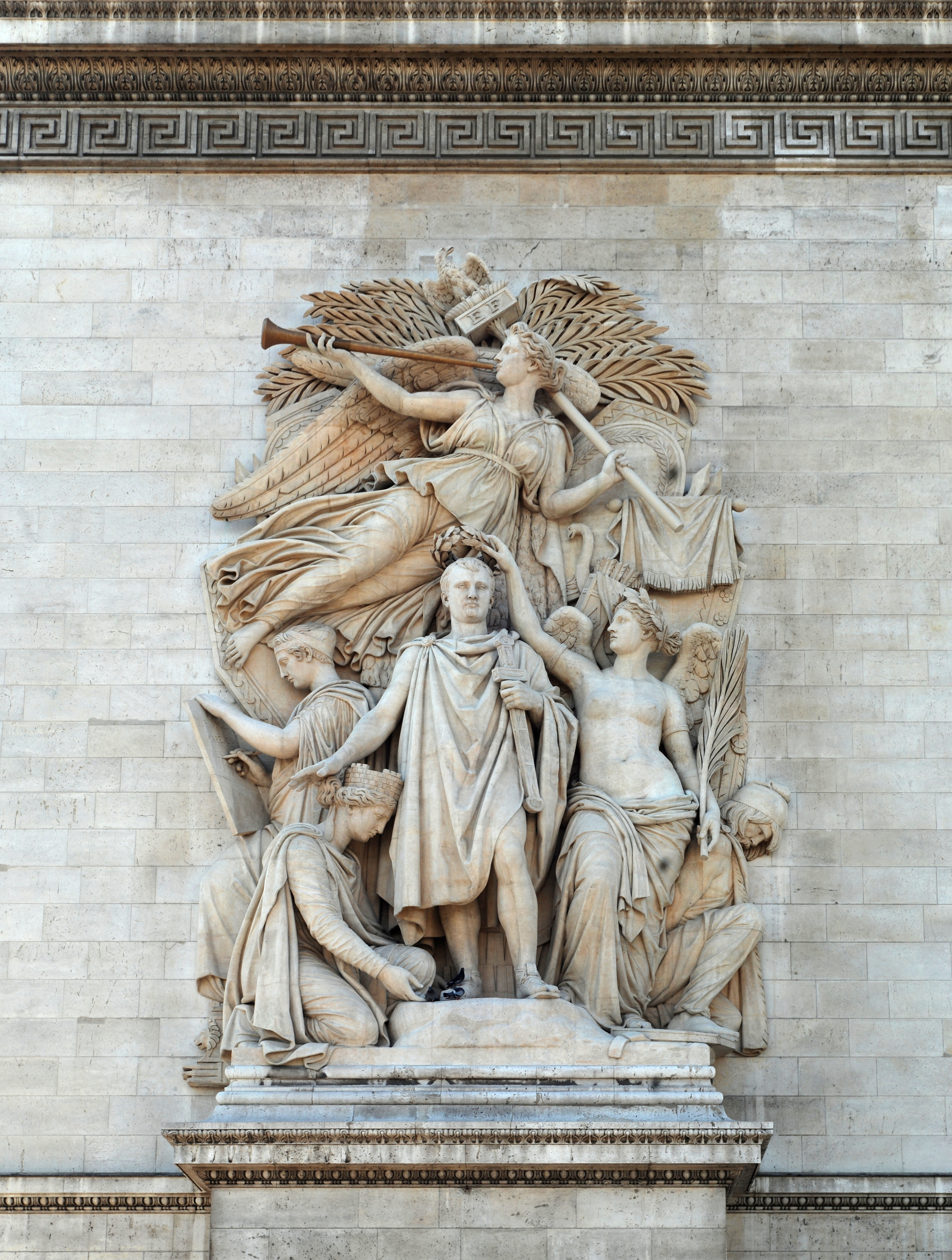
Relief on Arc de Triomphe

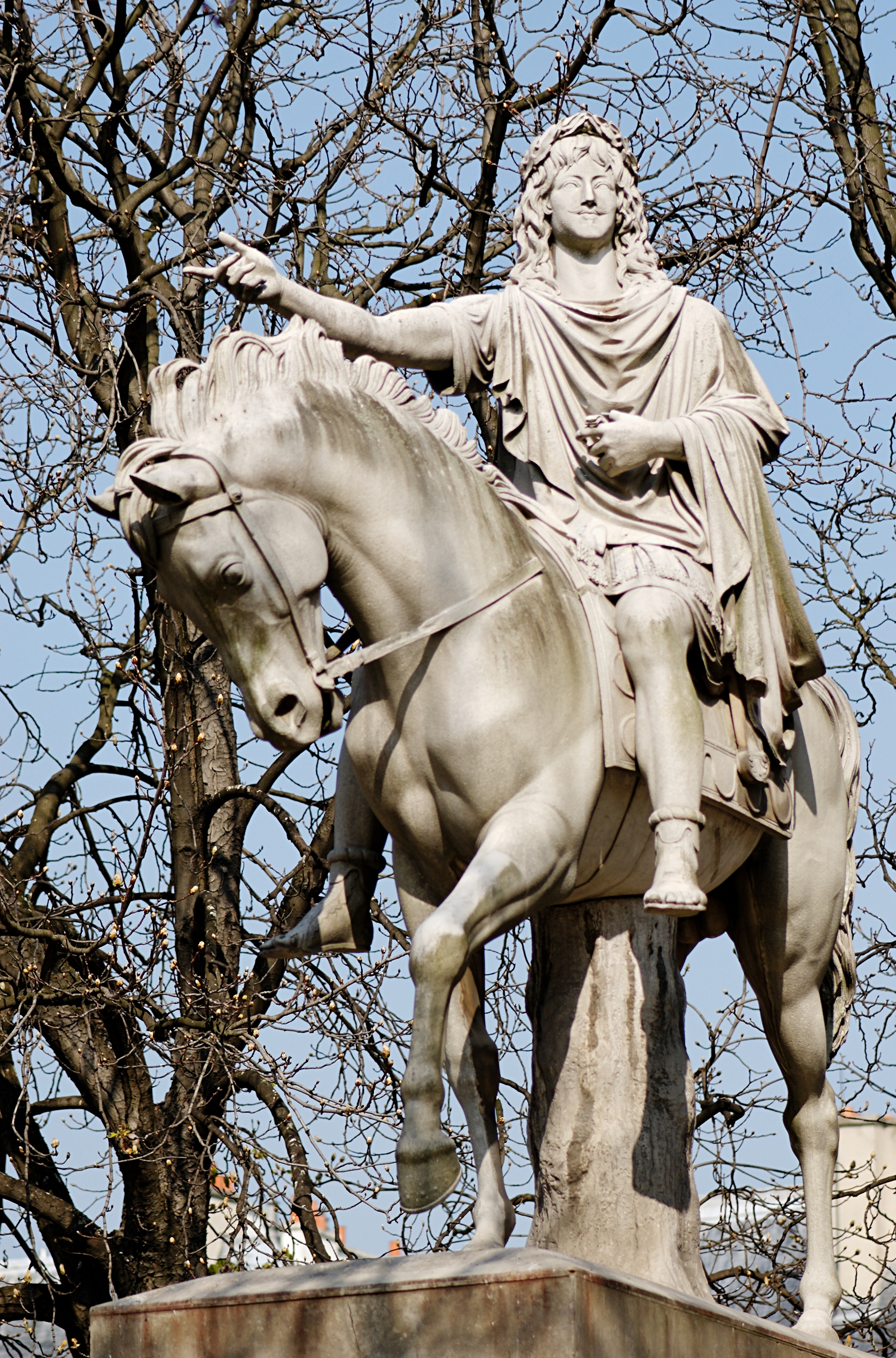
Louis XIII

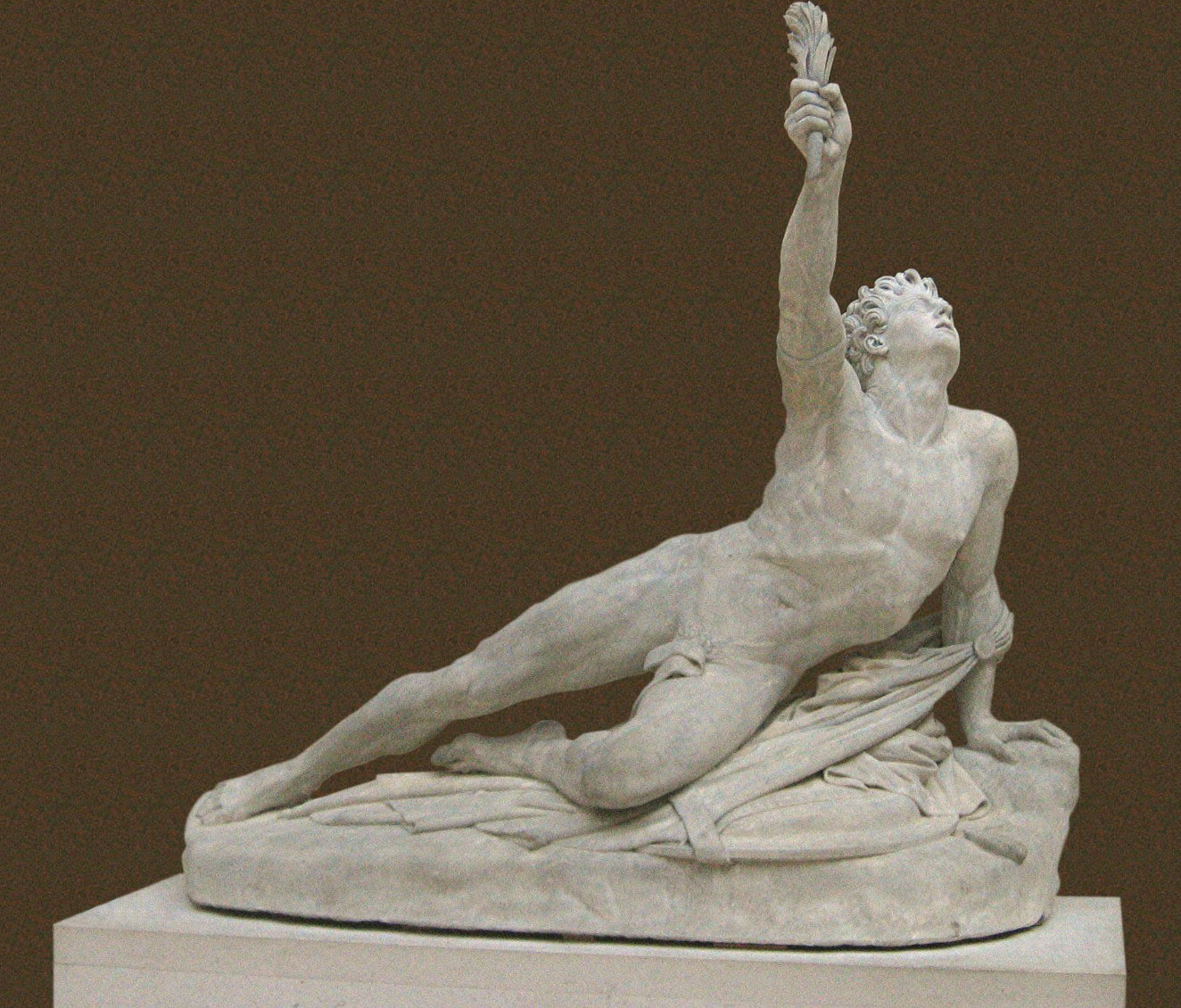
A soldier brings the news to Marathon

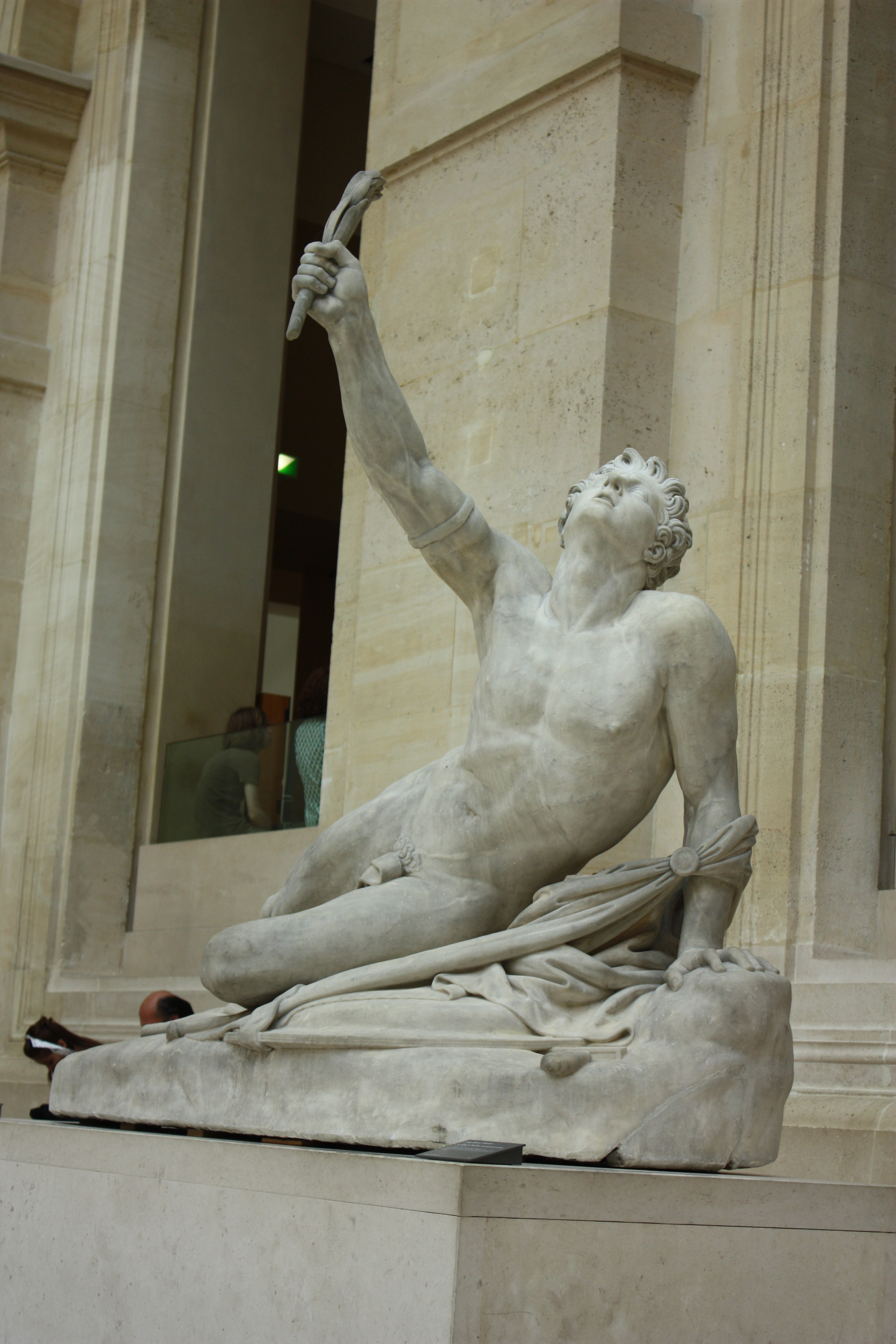
Soldier returns with news of victory

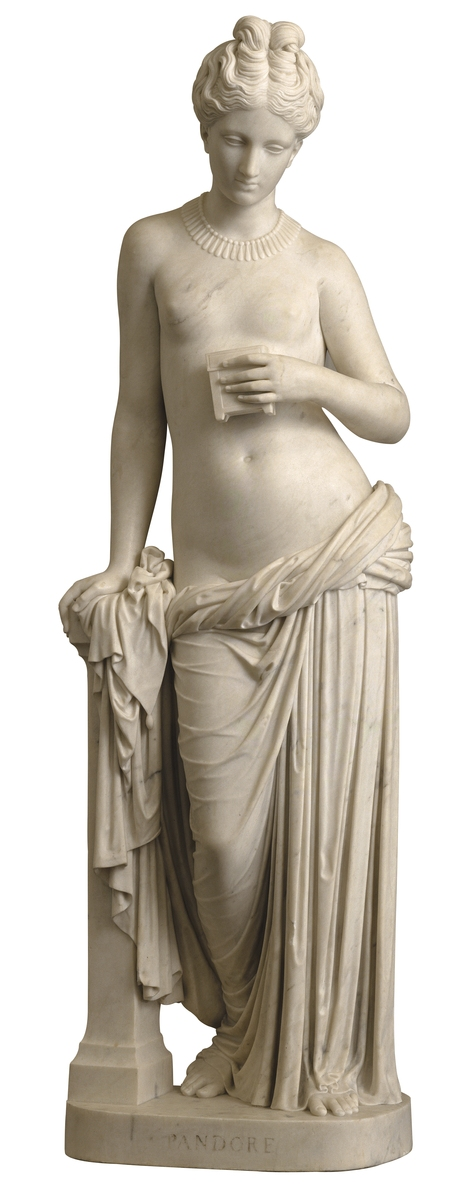
Pandora, 1819

== Sources ==
- This page translated from its French equivalent accessed 9/14/2010
