= Kadıköy bull statue =

Sculpture in Istanbul, Turkey

- Kadıköy Boğa Heykeli (Turkish)
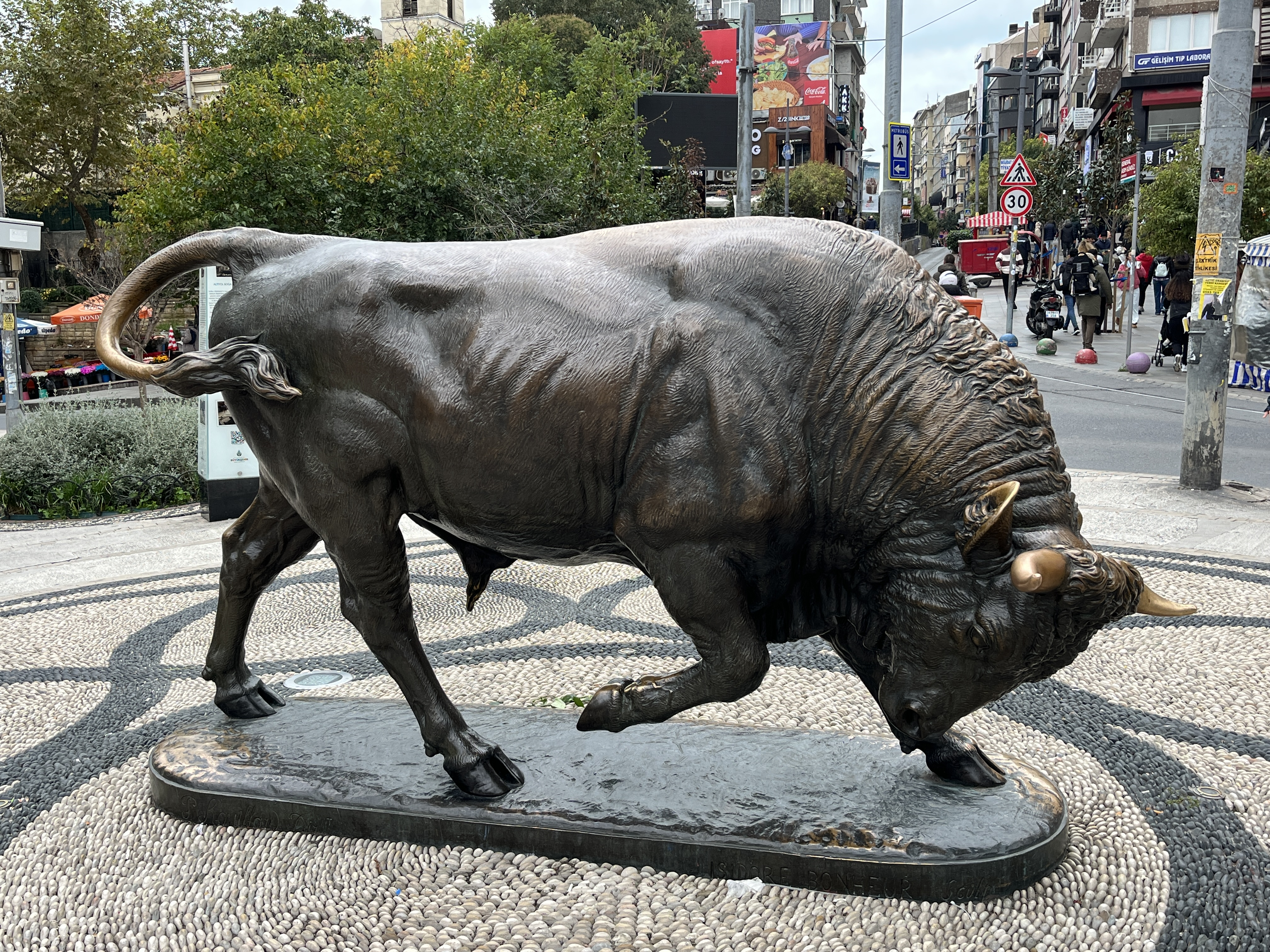
- The statue in 2023
- Location: Kadıköy, Istanbul

The Kadıköy bull statue is a statue of a bull installed in Kadıköy, Istanbul, Turkey. The bull has become a mascot for the neighborhood. It was ordered by Abdülaziz in 1864 and created by French artist Rouillard in Paris. The statue has been in its current location on Altıyol Square since 1987.

== See also ==
- Big Bull, India
- Charging Bull
- List of public art in Istanbul
