= Pandora (sculpture) =

Marble sculpture by Jean-Pierre Cortot

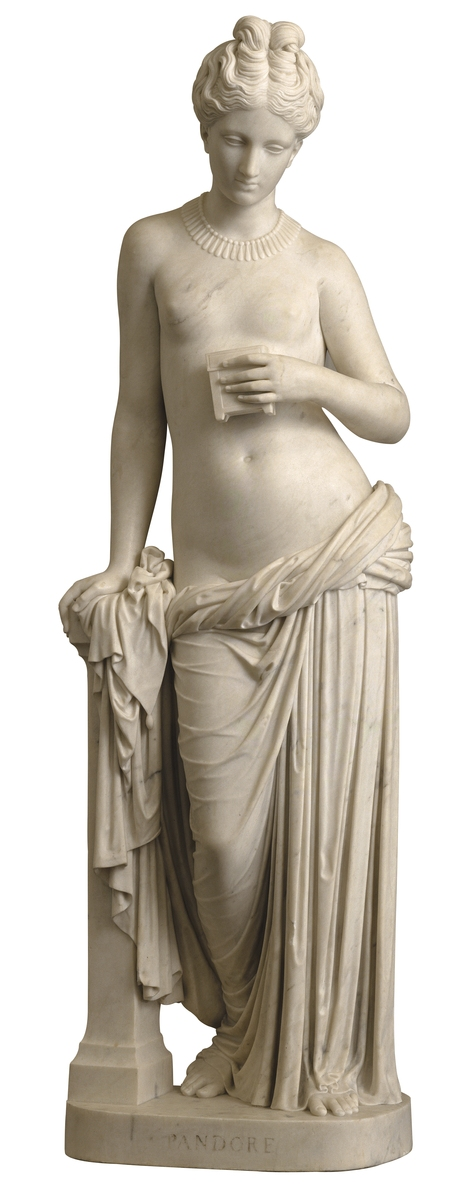

Pandora is an 1819 neoclassical marble sculpture by Jean-Pierre Cortot, produced during his stay in Villa Medici in 1819. It shows the moment when Pandora received her box from Jupiter. It was exhibited in Paris at the Salon of 1819. It measures 159 × 48 × 35 cm.

François-Louis Dejuinne was inspired to make a drawing of it. This is in the collection of the Musée des Beaux-Arts d'Angers.

The work was purchased by the French Minister of the Interior, for the collection of the Musée des Beaux-Arts de Lyon, where it has been since 1820.

== History ==
Jean-Pierre Cortot left for the Villa Medici in 1810 after having earned the Prix de Rome. In 1813, he created a nude sculpture of Pandora, which was exhibited in 1814. He then reworked this piece, particularly the head, for a new 1815 exhibition. This first version of Pandora has since disappeared.

In a letter, dated 17 April 1817, Cortot declared he was resuming his work on the theme, with a version that was "of a younger and half-draped nature". He worked on the piece between 1818 and 1819 before exhibiting it at the Salon in 1819, where it received a gold medal. The sculpture was immediately bought by the city of Lyon, alongside Cortot's sculpture of Narcissus, for 15,000 francs. Pandora was sent to Lyon on 28 June 1820.

This is the second sculpture by Cortot to be added to the collections at the Musée des Beaux-Arts de Lyon, following the now-disappeared Euridipe statue.

According to art historians Dora and Erwin Panofsky, a sketch by François-Louis Dejuinne, on which it is noted "composed and executed in marble by Cortot", is kept at the Musée des Beaux-Arts d'Angers, and is said to be the model for the statue. The two men knew each other, Dejuinne having been at the Villa Medici in 1813.

== Description ==
Pandora is a young woman created by the Roman god of fire, Vulcan, on Jupiter's orders. Jupiter uses Pandora to take revenge on Prometheus for defying the Olympian gods by stealing fire from them and giving it to humanity. Jupiter gives Pandora a box containing all of humanity's evils and crimes, which she must give to Epimetheus, whom she is to marry. However, she opens the box out of curiosity and releases its contents.

In his composition, Cortot adopted the trends and styles of his time. Note how her box becomes a kind of jewellery box.

"Thin, upright and pensive, Cortot's Pandora takes on the appearance of an antique Roman column with her impeccable form and her tunic with its straight, fluted folds".

In the 1960s, the art historians Dora and Edwin Panofsky considered Pandora to "usher in a series of 19th-century works in which the names and attributes of Pandora are scarcely more than a pretext for showing charming female nudity or seminudity".

== Context ==
Henri-Joseph Rutxhiel arrived at the Villa Medici in 1809 and created a marble Pandora that was exhibited in 1822 at the Salon. Similar in style to the nudes of Jean-Auguste-Dominique Ingres, it bears some similarities to Cortot's Pandora. In 1856, John Gibson paid homage to Cortot by following the same theme, again in the neoclassical style.

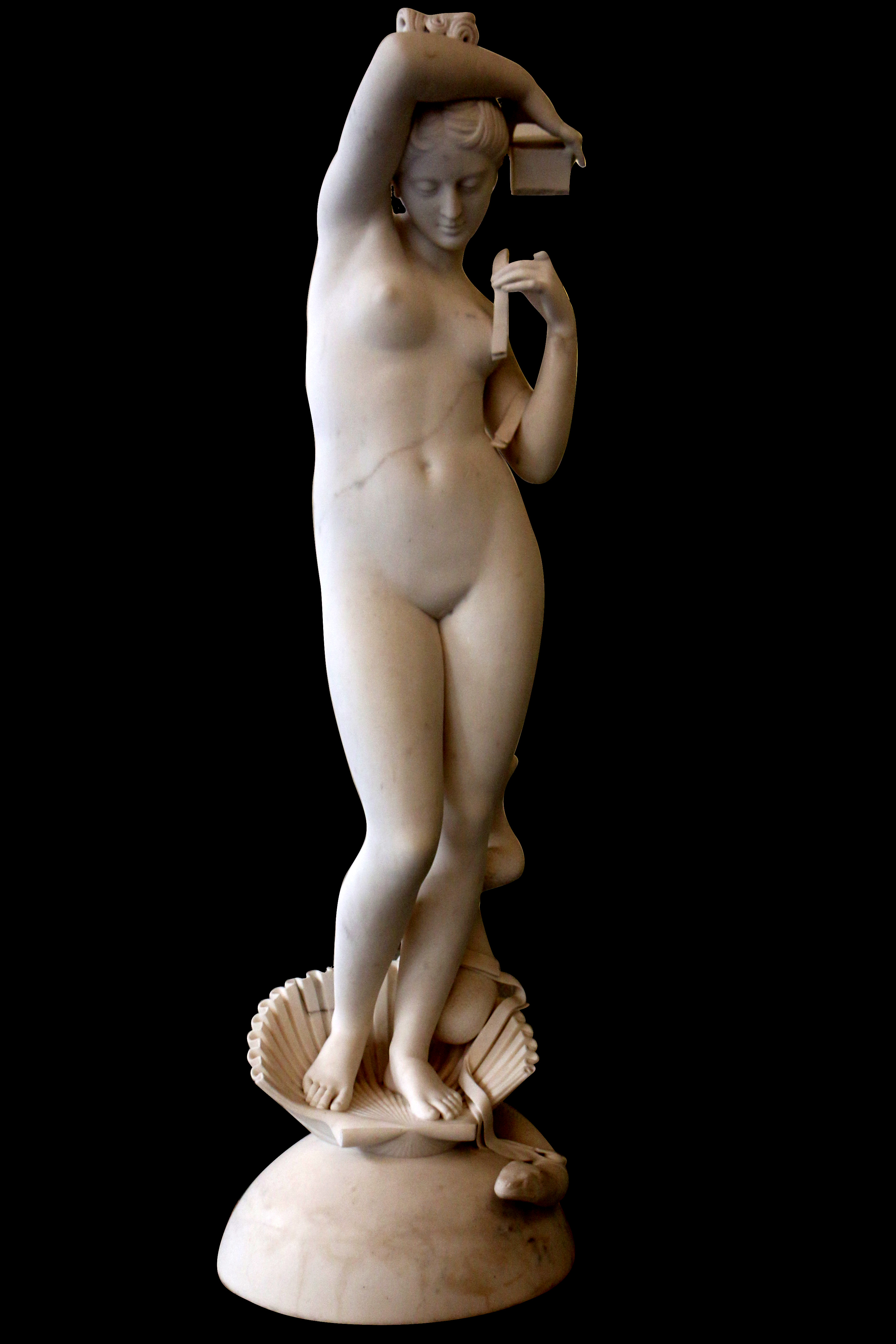
Pandora by Henri-Joseph Ruxthiel (1822)

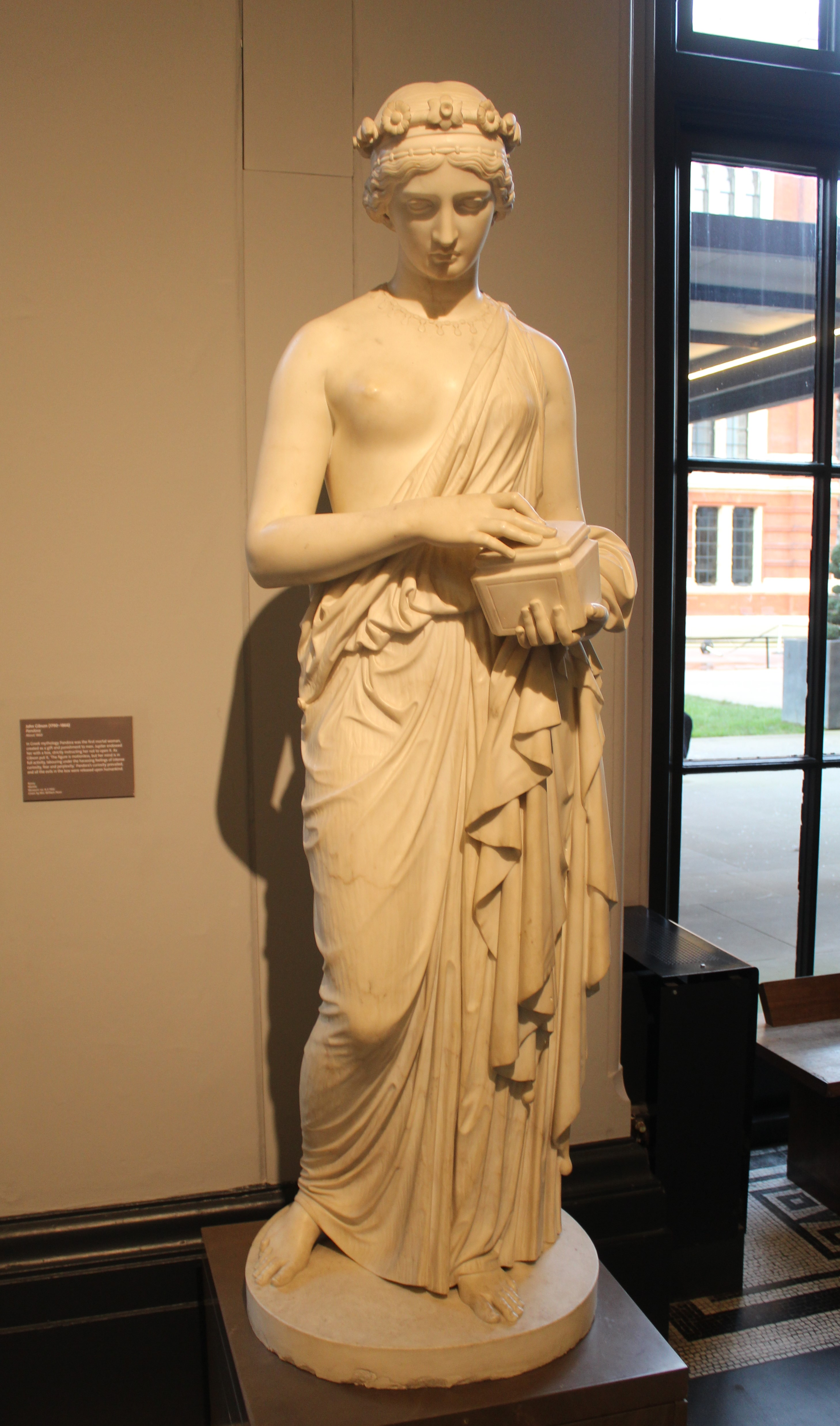
Pandora by John Gibson (1856)

== Gallery ==
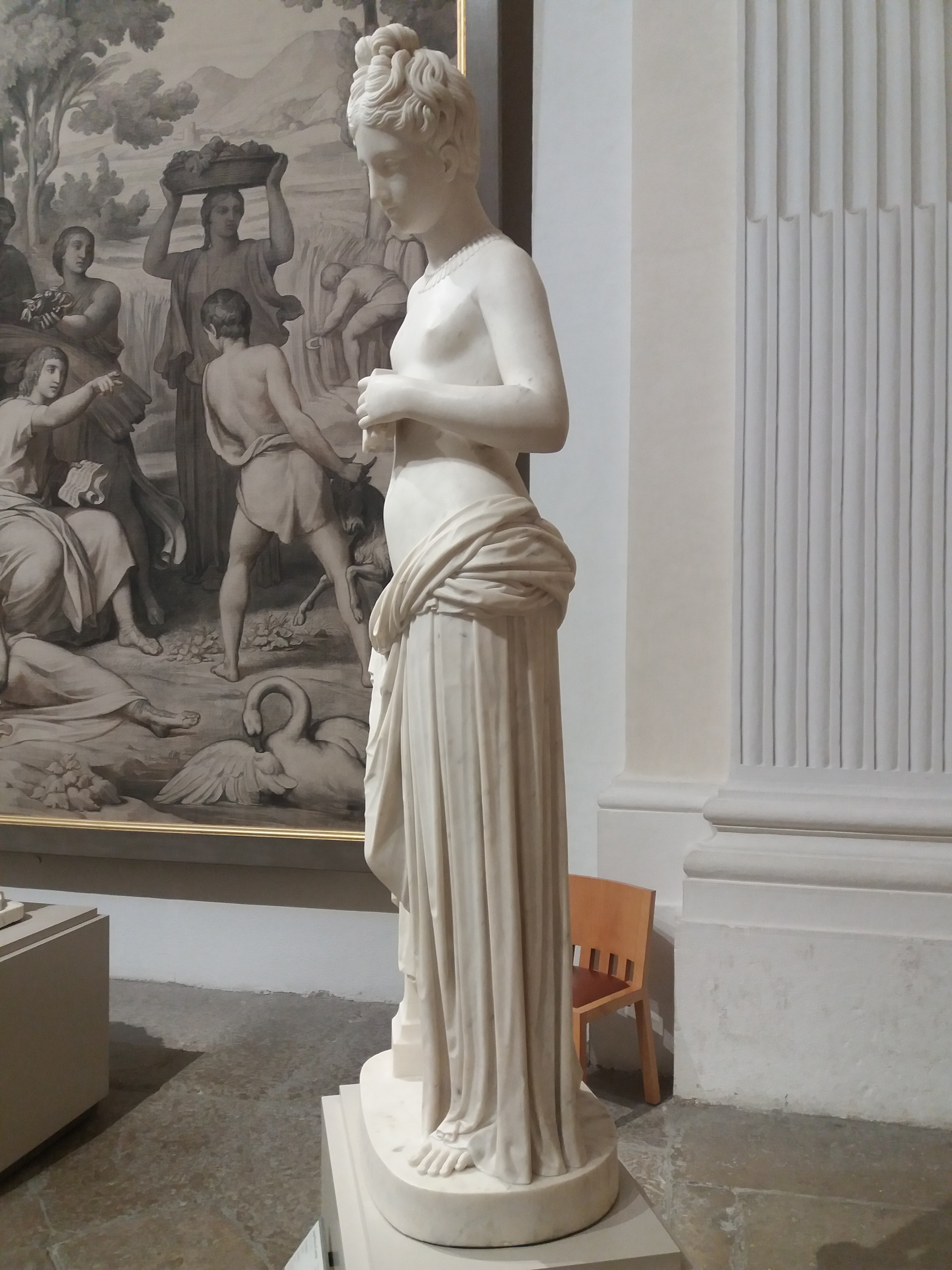

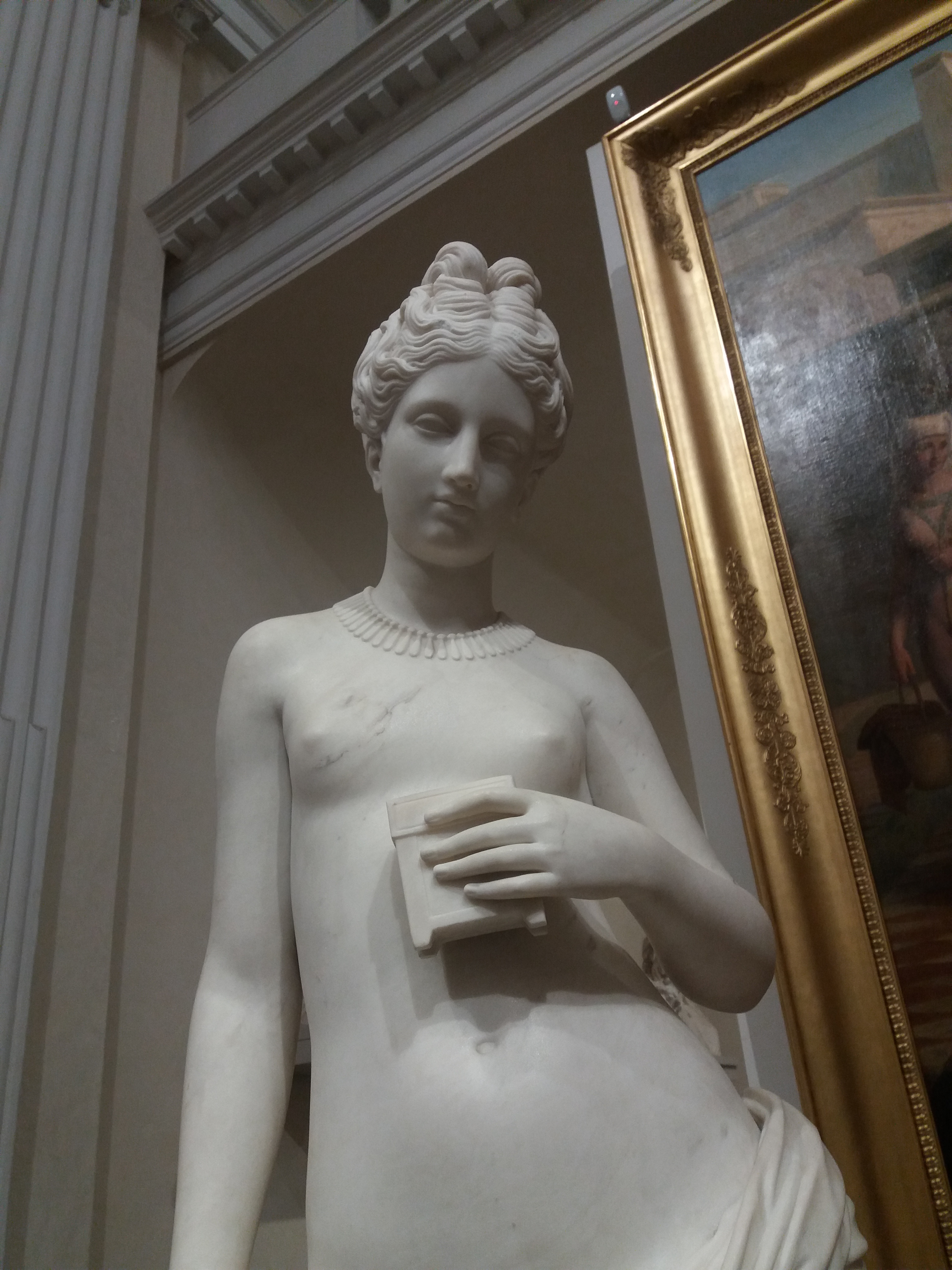

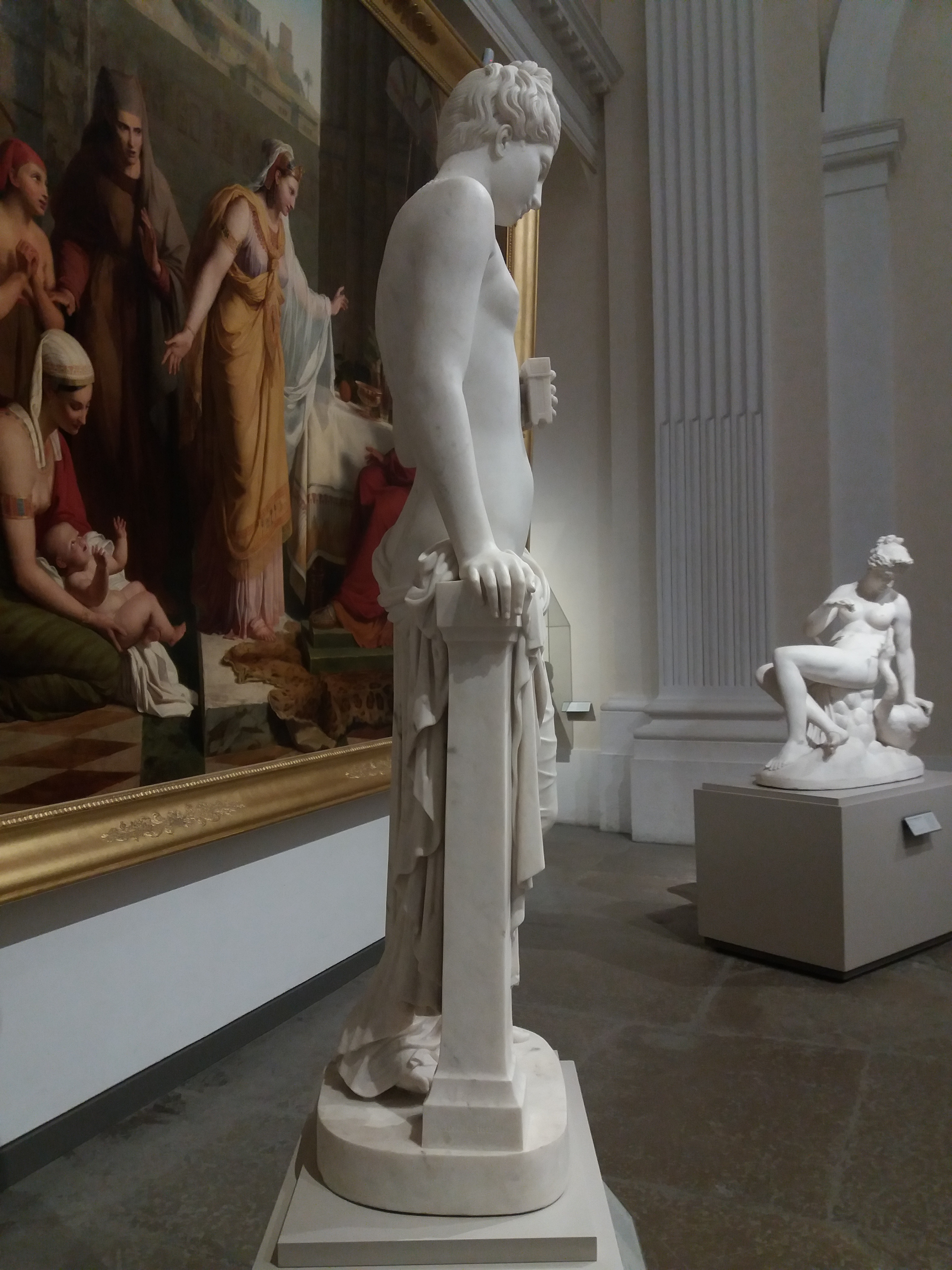

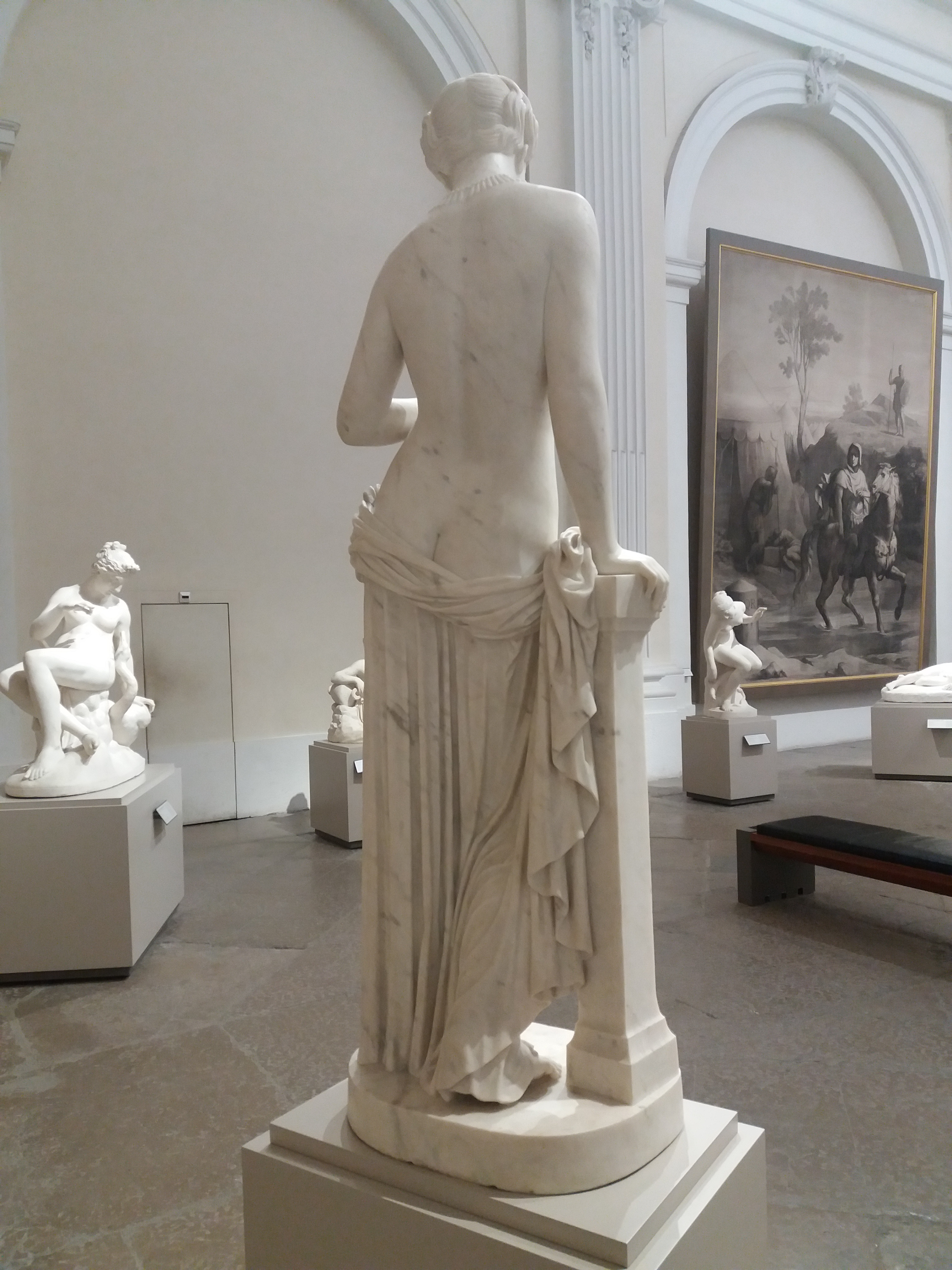
