= Pierre Louis Rouillard =

French sculptor

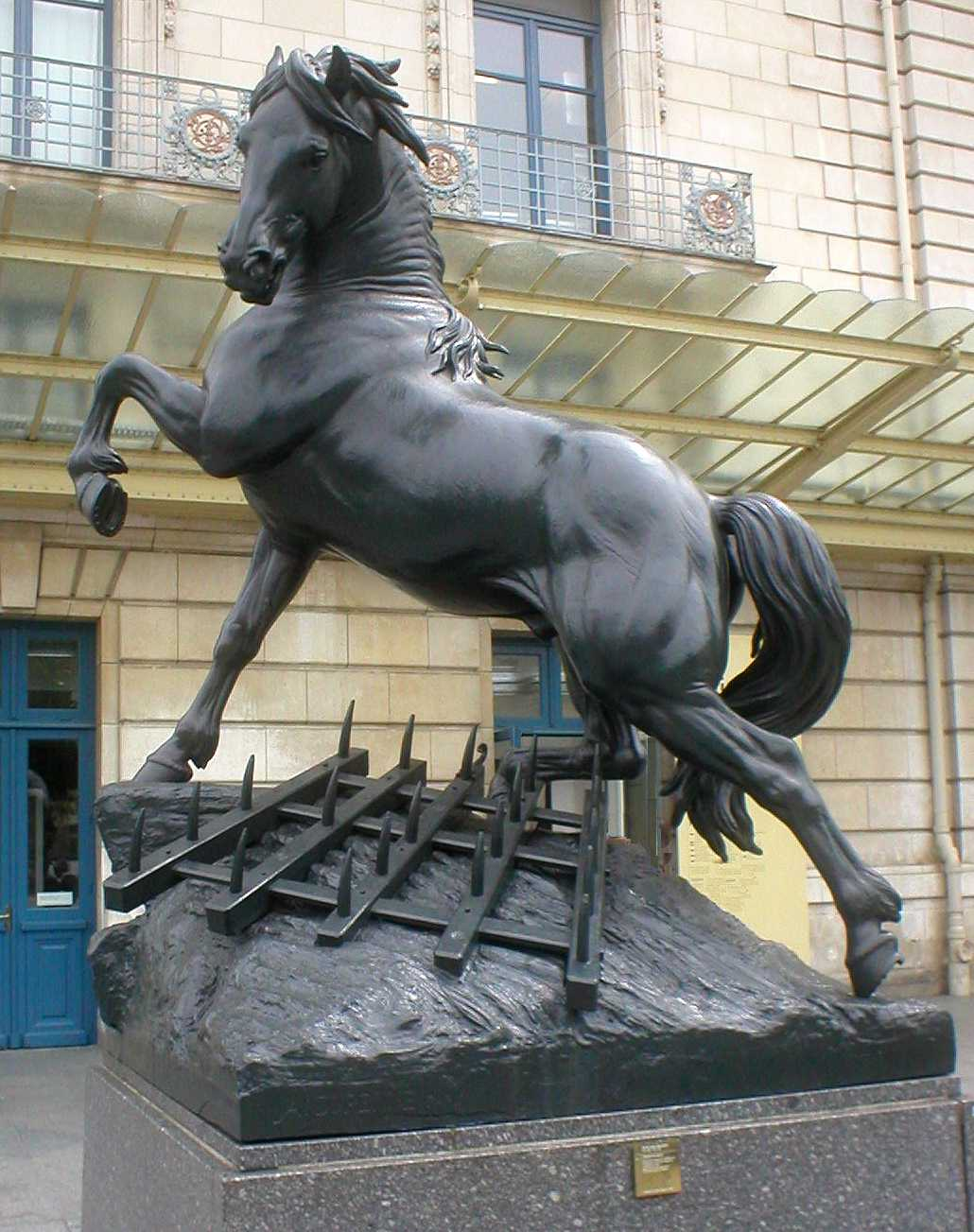
Cheval à la herse

Pierre Louis Rouillard (French pronunciation: [pjɛʁ lwi ʁujaʁ]; Paris, 16 January 1820 – Paris, 2 June 1881) was a French sculptor known for his sculptures of animals. He was one of a "school of French animalières", which also included Pierre-Jules Mêne, Antoine-Louis Barye, Auguste Caïn and François Pompon. He worked mainly in cast iron rather than bronze.

Rouillard attended the École des Beaux-Arts in Paris, where he was a pupil of Jean-Pierre Cortot. He was a professor of sculpture at the École des Arts décoratifs from 1840 to 1881. François Pompon studied with him.

His works include sculptures for the Opéra de Paris, Palais du Louvre and the Fontaine Saint-Michel. He was commissioned to travel to Istanbul, by Sultan Abdulaziz. He has many sculptures in different locations of Istanbul, including a bull sculpture at the center of Istanbul's Kadıköy district. He was awarded the Ordre des Palmes Académiques and made a Chevalier of the Légion d'honneur. He is buried at Issy.

== Works ==
Name	Location	Date	Notes
"Lion de l'Indie"	Quinta da Regaleira	1837	This was the year that Rouillard enrolled at the Paris Beaux-Arts as a pupil of Jean Pierre Cortot. This work was his first submission to the Paris Salon.
"Dromadaire"	Whereabouts not known	1838	A study of a camel in plaster
"Chien roquet culbutant un chat"	Whereabouts not known	1840	Funds received from the sale of this piece were used to buy a deferment of military service to avoid any interruption to his studies.
Ivory carving of animals on a tankard.	RMN-Grand Palais (musée du Louvre)	1840	Here Rouillard worked with silversmith François-Désiré Froment-Meurice on an ornate tankard with an ivory carving of lions on the attack.
"Chasse au sanglier"	Whereabouts not known	1841	In 1842, this work was exhibited at the Paris Salon and was awarded a "médaille de 3ème classe". This was the year that Rouillard left the École des Beaux-Arts.
"Enfants chèvre et chevreau"	Whereabouts not known	1847	A study of goats.
Bust of Félix Clément		1845	Félix Clément was a professor at the Stanislas college. At this time Rouillard executed many busts and statuettes but by 1848 he had almost completely abandoned such work. In this year he became an officer in the National Guard and, in the same year, he composed his study of a hare "Étude de lévrier".
"Diane entre deux chiens"	The Louvre.Paris	1850-1857	In around 1850, Rouillard was appointed as head of the Louvre's restoration department, an important post, giving him charge of a group of 10 sculptors and from 1850 to 1857 Rouillard not only executed the relief "Diane entre deux chiens" which sits below the two windows on the first floor of the Louvre's pavilion Richelieu, but carried out several other works, including capitals with depictions of wolves, wild boar, falcons and "mouflons de corse" (mountain goats) and pediments depicting the birth of a horse and another depicting two lions. He also created a crest to decorate the windows of the pavillon Richelieu. With the sculptor Delafontaine he also executed the pediment relief "Navigation" and "Diane sur un cerf" working with Paul et Numa Lechesne in 1851. Other works include "Couronnement de l'attique", "Trophies", "Trophée maritime" and "Trophée d'armes et d'attributs des arts". The photographer Edouard Denis Baldus took many photographs of Rouillard's work at the Louvre and these can be seen on the Musée d'Orsay's website.
"Renard et lapins"	Whereabouts not known.	1852	This study of a fox and rabbits was in plaster
Restoration of the Saint-Jacques Tower		1854	Whilst working at the Louvre Rouillard became involved in the restoration of the tour Saint-Jacques. He worked alongside Pierre Loison, Georges Diebolt, Jean-Louis Chenillion, Dantan aîné et Froget under the direction of Théodore Ballu and the inspectors Garnier and Roguet
The Cour Lefuel	The Louvre	1857-1858	The Louvre has six interior courtyards apart from the Cour Carrée and the Cour Napoléon. Three are in the Richelieu wing and three in the Denon wing. The Cour Lefuel served as an access point to the palace stables and the "Salle du Manège Impérial". Access to the latter, the Imperial riding school was via a winding ramp built to facilitate the movement of horses, and between 1857 and 1858 Rouillard executed four sculptures of fighting animals for the ramp's approach .
Eagles	The Louvre	1861	Rouillard finished his work at the Louvre with the carvings of eagles. He also carried out work for the silversmith Christofle which included a cup/trophy depicting Ceres, the compositions "Moutons à tête noire", "Moutons et bélier" and "Vache normande"
Surtouts or table decorations for the Paris Hôtel de ville.	Paris	1859	These surtout or table decorations depicted sea-horses and tritons and an eagle guiding a sailor.
Trophy by Christofle & Cie	Musée d'Orsay	1862	The Musée d'Orsay also hold this cup, mainly made of silver, created by Christofle the renowned French silversmith, who used Rouillard to create the central figure of Cérès and four medallions. This cup was the prize awarded in a regional agricultural competition.
"Tete du cheval Ajax monté par l'Empereur à Solférino"	Whereabouts not known	1863	
Work for Sultan Abdul Aziz,	Istanbul	1864	In this year an order was received from the Sultan for 24 groups of animals, both in bronze and marble. This was a huge award and Rouillard used several other sculptors to enable him to complete the work. Since the original installations some of the sculptures have been moved to new locations and castings by several foundries mean that the sculptures, sometimes with minor amendments, appear in many diverse locations.
"Taureau"	Kadıköy		Isadore Jules Bonheur was one of the team of sculptors who worked on the Sultan's order and under the direction of Rouillard. This sculpture of a bull was shown at the Éxposition universelle of 1878 in Paris and editions can be seen in many parts of the world including the Istanbul suburb of Kadıköy. It was cast by Val d'Osne and appears as model 118 in their catalogue, cast in either cast iron or bronze.
"Cerf" or Stag	In various locations	Various	One of the sculptures for Istanbul, that of a "cerf" has been reproduced many times, including that in Senlis.
Élan	Istanbul	1864	This work in marble was executed for the Beylerbeyi palace
Tribunal de Commerce de Paris	Paris	1865	This building was designed by the architect Bailly in 1865 at the request of Napoleon III and in the vestibule there are sculptures of two lions by Rouillard.
Château de la Montagne	Saint-Honoré-les-Bains	1865	The original chateau was destroyed in the 16th century. Rebuilt by Guillaume des Jours, the château was acquired in 1786 by the d'Espeuilles family. The marquis Antoine Théodore d'Espeuilles built a pottery next to the château and charged the architect Félix Duban to carry out improvements to the château itself. These improvements included a grand staircase ("Escalier d'honneur") which featured a terracotta sculpture of a hunting scene by Rouillard. This sculpture depicts Antoine Théodore killing a wild boar who had caused awful carnage when attacking Theodore's dogs, and the reliefs on the pedestal supporting the sculpture show the marquis killing the beast as it went under his horse.
Lions on railway bridge	Arles	1866	In 1868 a bridge was built to allow trains of the Paris-Lyon-Marseille railway to link Arles to Lunel crossing the Rhone river. In particular the bridge facilitated moving coal mined in the Cevennes mountains. At each end of the bridge there were pillars upon which were Rouillard sculptures of seated lions. During an allied bombing raid in August 1944 the bridge was destroyed but Rouillard's lions and the supporting pillars survived.
Cast iron garden urn	Whereabouts not known		
Sculptures of Eagles for the Emperor pavilion at the Paris Opera.		1869	In this year Rouillard lost many of his working models and casts when engineers set about clearing the area on the perimeter of Fort Issy and demolished his house and studio.
Models of a pigsty.		1870	This work was commissioned by Christofle.
Statues in Le Grand Rond	Toulouse		There are two statues by Rouillard in this Toulouse public park. One depicts a chained dog guarding her puppies. This faces the nearby second sculpture of a wolf who also has her young in tow. The one statue seems to interreact with the other. The other statues in the park are Antonin Mercié's "Louis Vestrepain" and "David terrassant Goliath", Alexandre Falguière's "Vainqueur du combat de coqs", "Le réveil de Morphée" by Léo Laporte-Blairsy and a bust of Lucien Mengaud by Véronique Gourtade. The Grand Rond was built between 1752 and 1754 and takes the form of a very large roundabout with four pathways leading from it; the Jules Guesde, François Verdier, Paul-Sabatier and Frederic Mistral.
École nationale supérieure d'agronomie de Grignon		1874	A sculpture depicting "Berkshire" pigs was completed for this renown agricultural college.
Four statues of animals	Deauville	1878	In Deauville's boulevard de la Mer are four cast iron statues of wild animals. These were purchased by the Deauville municipality in 1964 for the town's foreshore. Although the works are not signed or dated, they are thought to be by Rouilllard; many copies of his figures were cast and put on the market as limited editions.
Silver table decoration entitled "La France distribuant des couronnes de gloire".	musée des Arts décoratifs. Paris	1878	A table decoration (surtout) by the silversmith Christofle, designed by François Gilbert with sculptural work by Rouillard. The piece was ordered by Napoleon III for the Tuileries palace and was shown at the Paris l'Exposition Universelle of 1855. It was discovered in the ruins of the Tuileries after the 1871 fire. In the centre of what is in fact a three part piece, an allegory of France in the form of a winged angel of victory, stands with arms outstretched, offering crowns. In one hand is a crown of laurels and in the other a crown of oak leaves. Around her are four seated female figures representing "Justice", "Concorde", "Force" and "Religion" and bearing the appropriate attributes. At her feet is a cherub and two winged angels and below is a shield with the Imperial crown and the letter "N". To the left of the central figure is the chariot of peace, driven by a woman holding a caduceus and drawn by four bulls whilst to the right a chariot of war is driven by an Etruscan warrior bearing a two-edged sword and driven by four horses.
Statue of the horse "Dollar"	Maisons-Laffitte	1878	Statue stands in the avenue Picard. Cast in bronze by Société Anonyme des Fonderies d'art du Val d'Aosne. The horse won the Goodwood cup in 1864. It was given as a gift to the town of Maisons-Laffitte by the American Frank Yay Gould..
Cheval à la herse	Musée d'Orsay	1878	This work in cast iron stands in a prominent position outside the Paris museum. It is arguably Rouillard's best known work and when commissioned it was intended as decoration for the Trocadéro palace. In the same year as he completed "Cheval à la herse" Rouillard completed works entitled "Cheval anglais" and "Cheval percheron".
The works "Porcs","Porcs et porcher" and "Bergerie"		1881	These were the last pieces executed by Rouillard before his death.
Stag	Bradford		This bronze depiction of a stag can be seen by Cartwright Hall in Lister Park, Bradford. Possibly a casting from Rouillard's Istanbul sculptures.
"Le grand cerf du Rond-Point Royal"	Vésinet		This is another Val d'Osne casting of Rouillard's "Cerf". It was number 129 in their catalogue and was slightly different to the casting made for Beylerbeyi. Val d'Osne cast two versions, the so-called "Le Cerf d'Europe" was catalogue number 129 and number 128 in the catalogue was the so-called "Cerf d'Amérique". The "Cerf d'Europe" was shown at the Paris Salon of 1877. The statue in Vésinet was a gift to the town from a Dr Raffegeau and the inauguration took place in 1928. There is another copy of the Val d'Osne casting in Senlis and another in the courtyard of the Château de Gien in front of the Musée International de la Chasse. Another was in the parkland of the Château de la Brévière in the Compiègne forest although this was sold and the present whereabouts is not known.
Lions for the Ministry of War	Paris	1874	
"Mastiff with puppies"	Dorfold Hall	1855	See

== Gallery of images ==
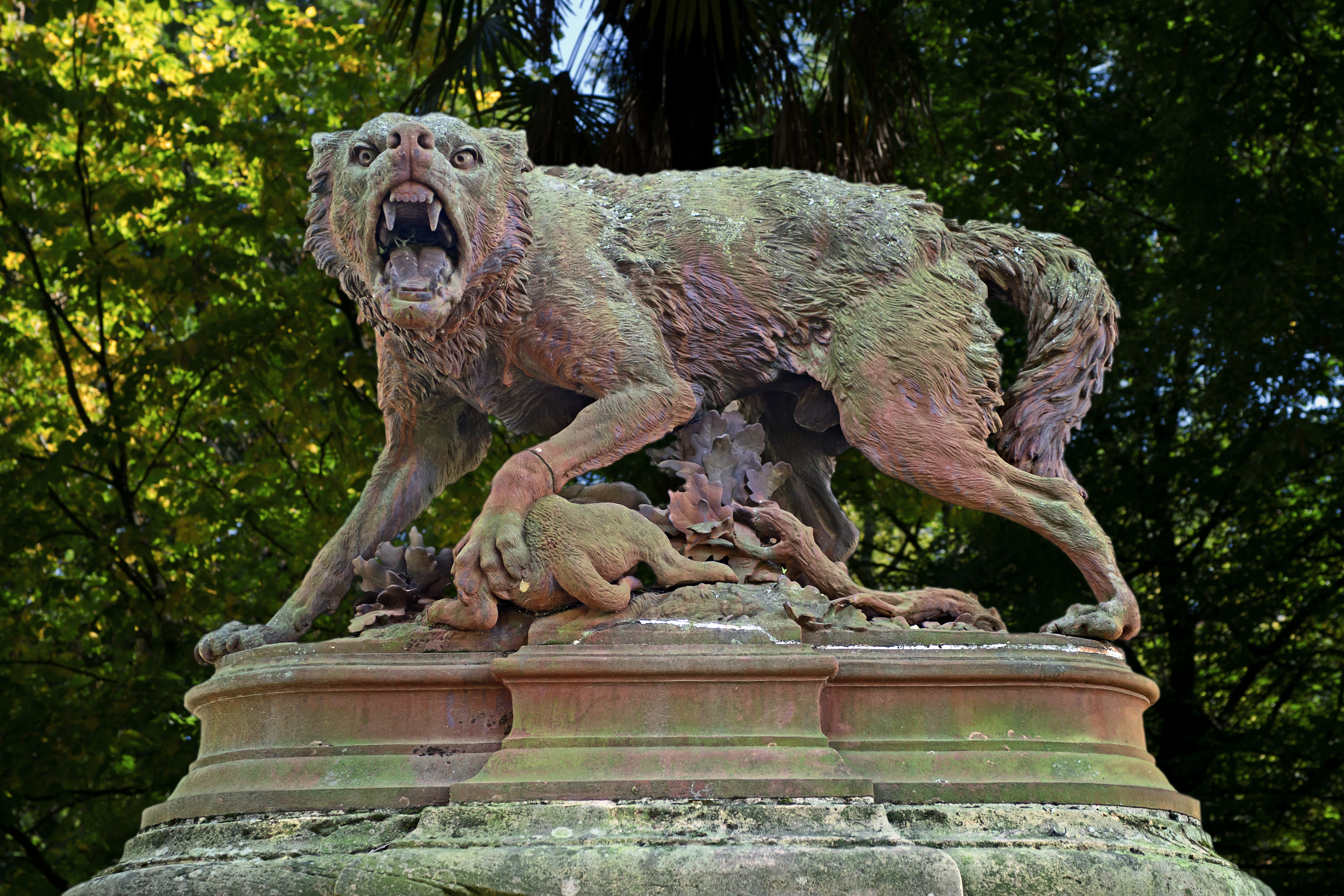
"La Louve" by entrance to the Garden of the “Grand Rond” in Toulouse.

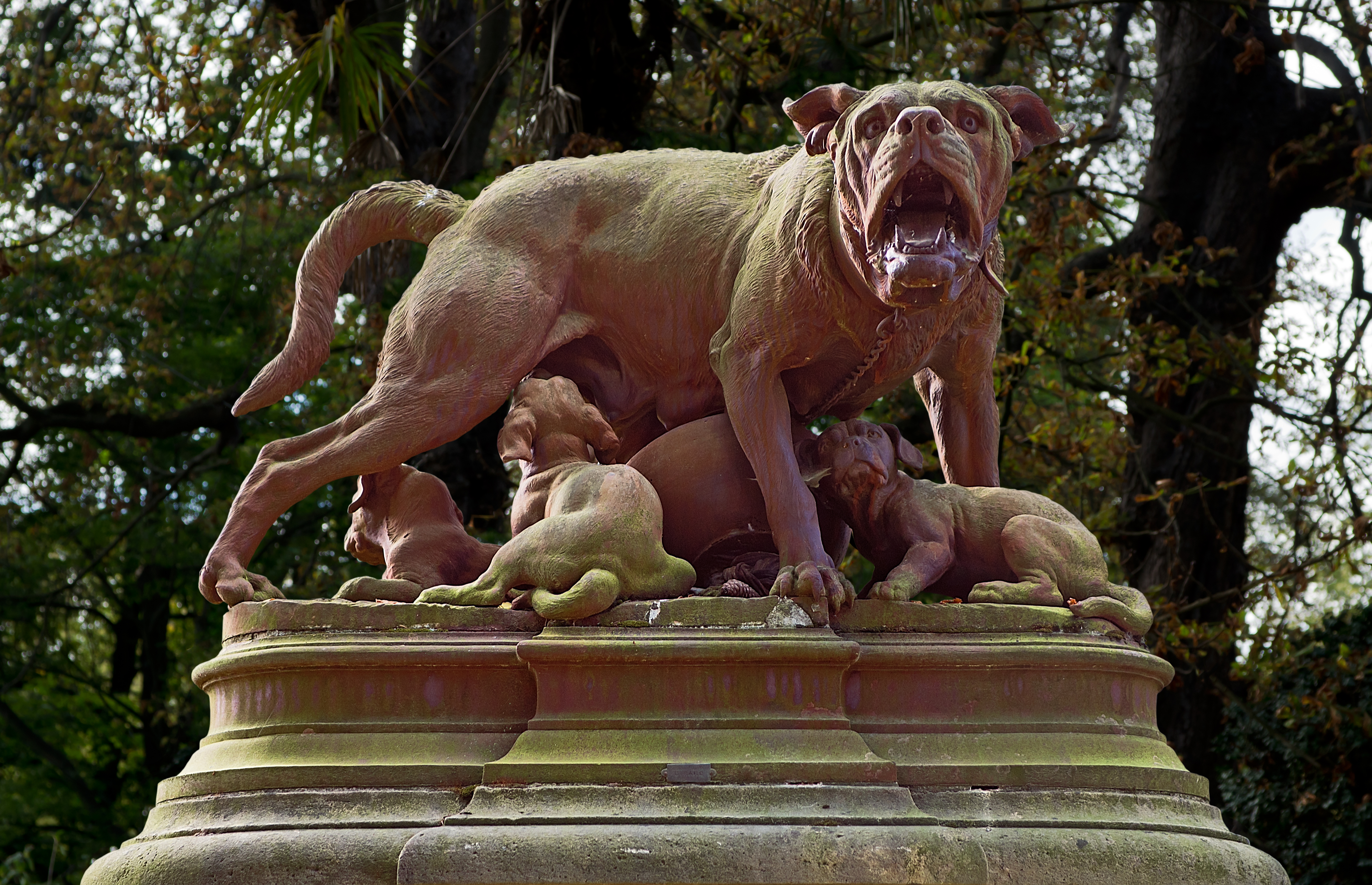
"La Chienne" by entrance to the Garden of the “Grand Rond” in Toulouse.

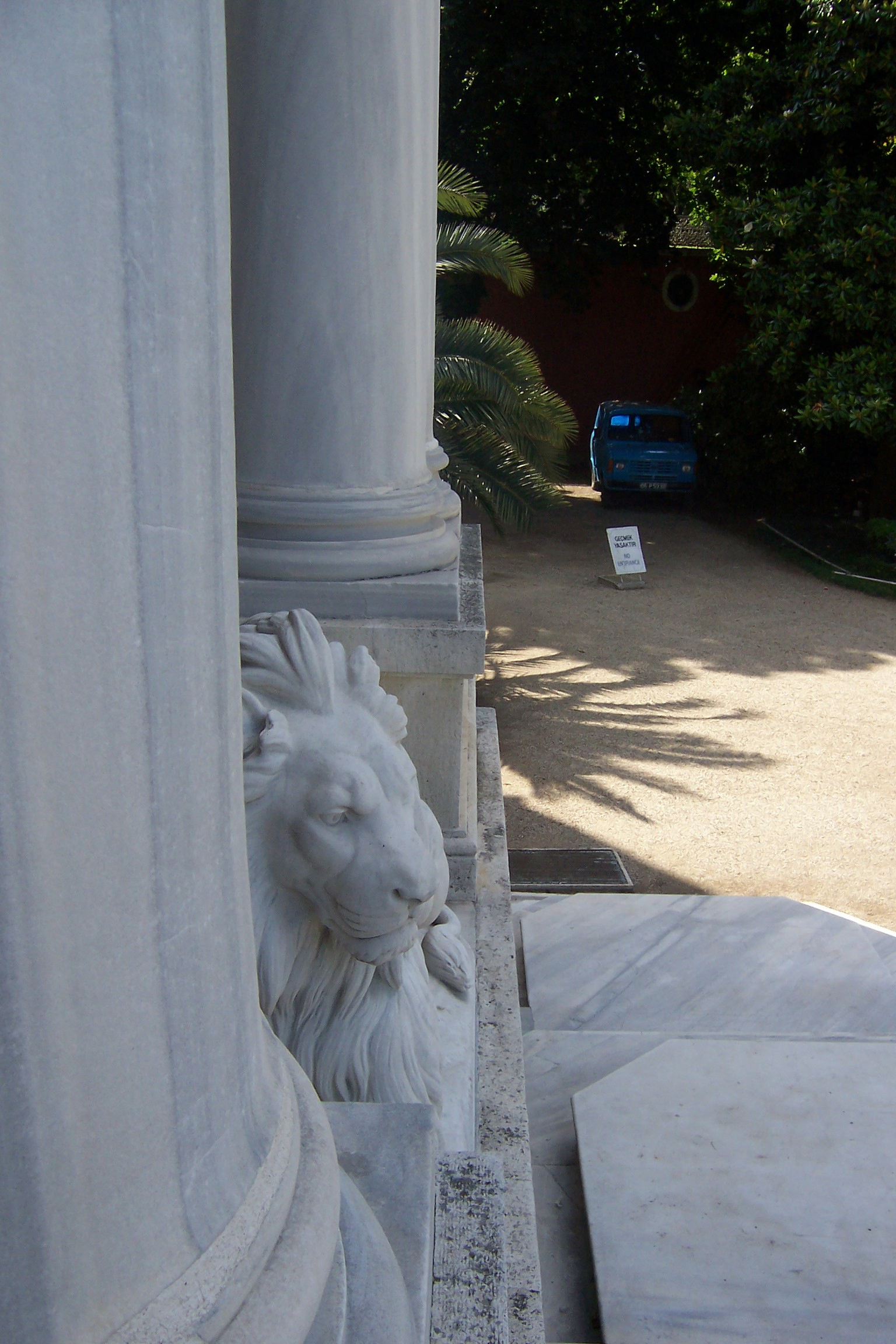

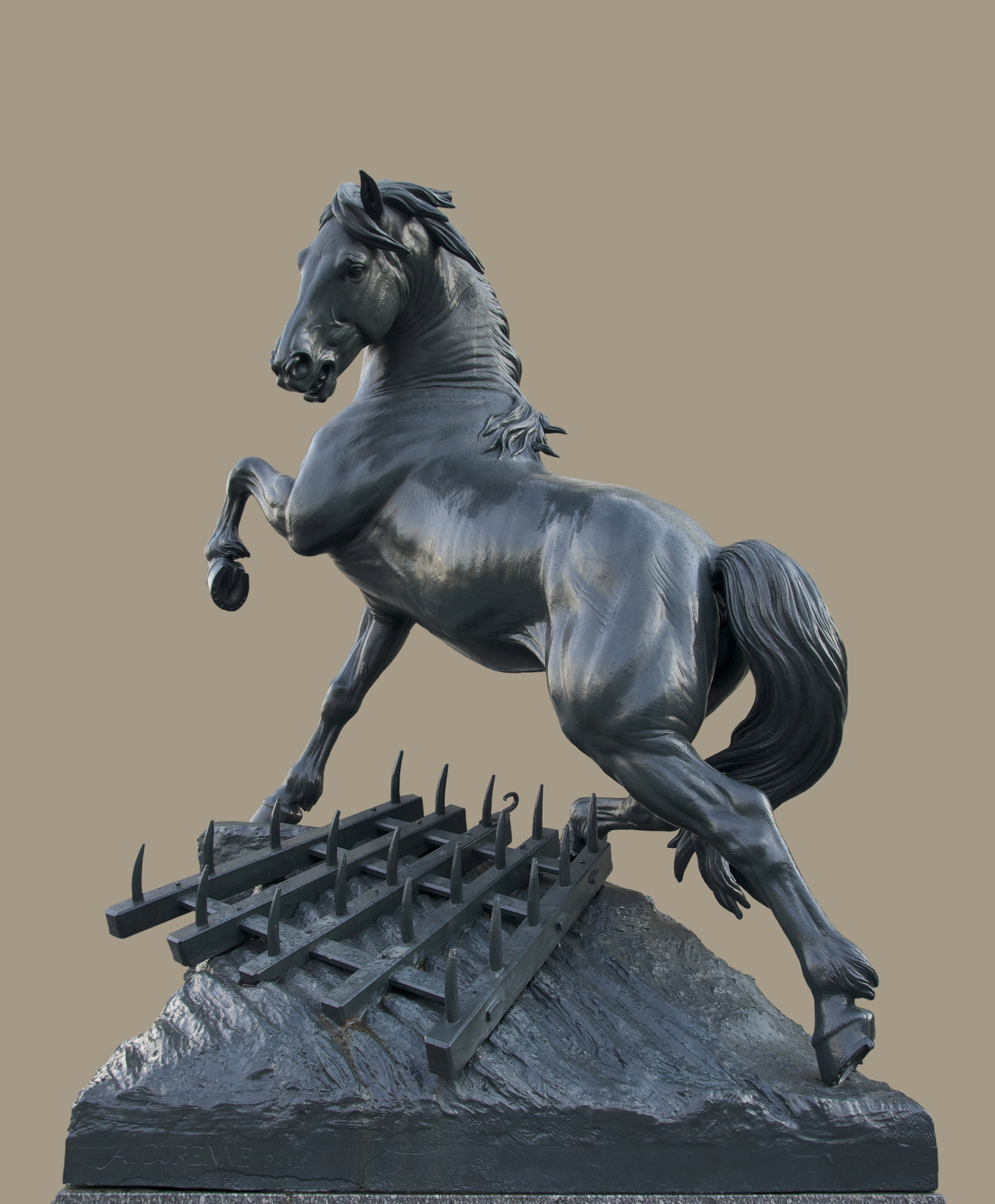

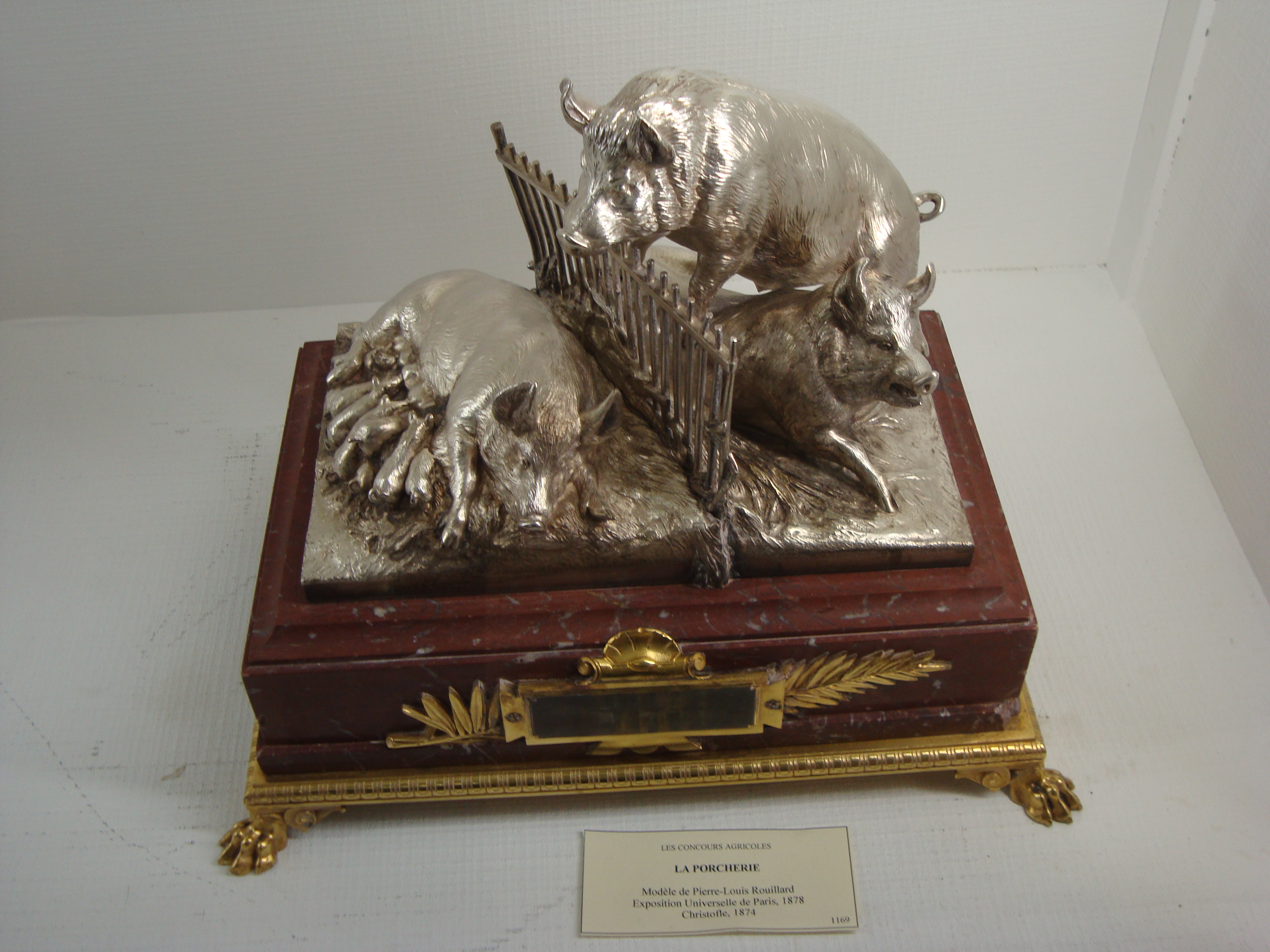
"Porcherie"

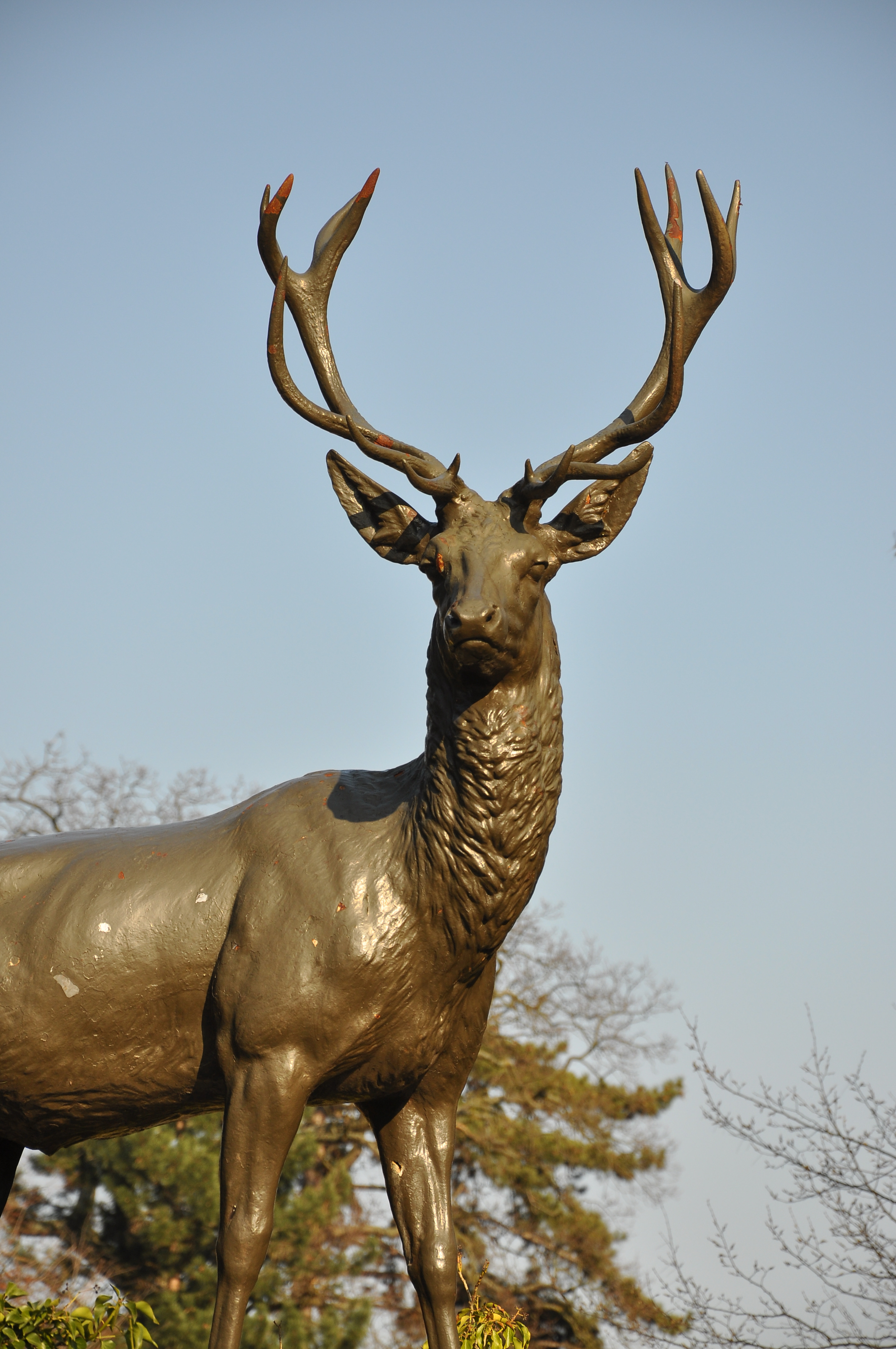
"Le cerf du Vésinet"

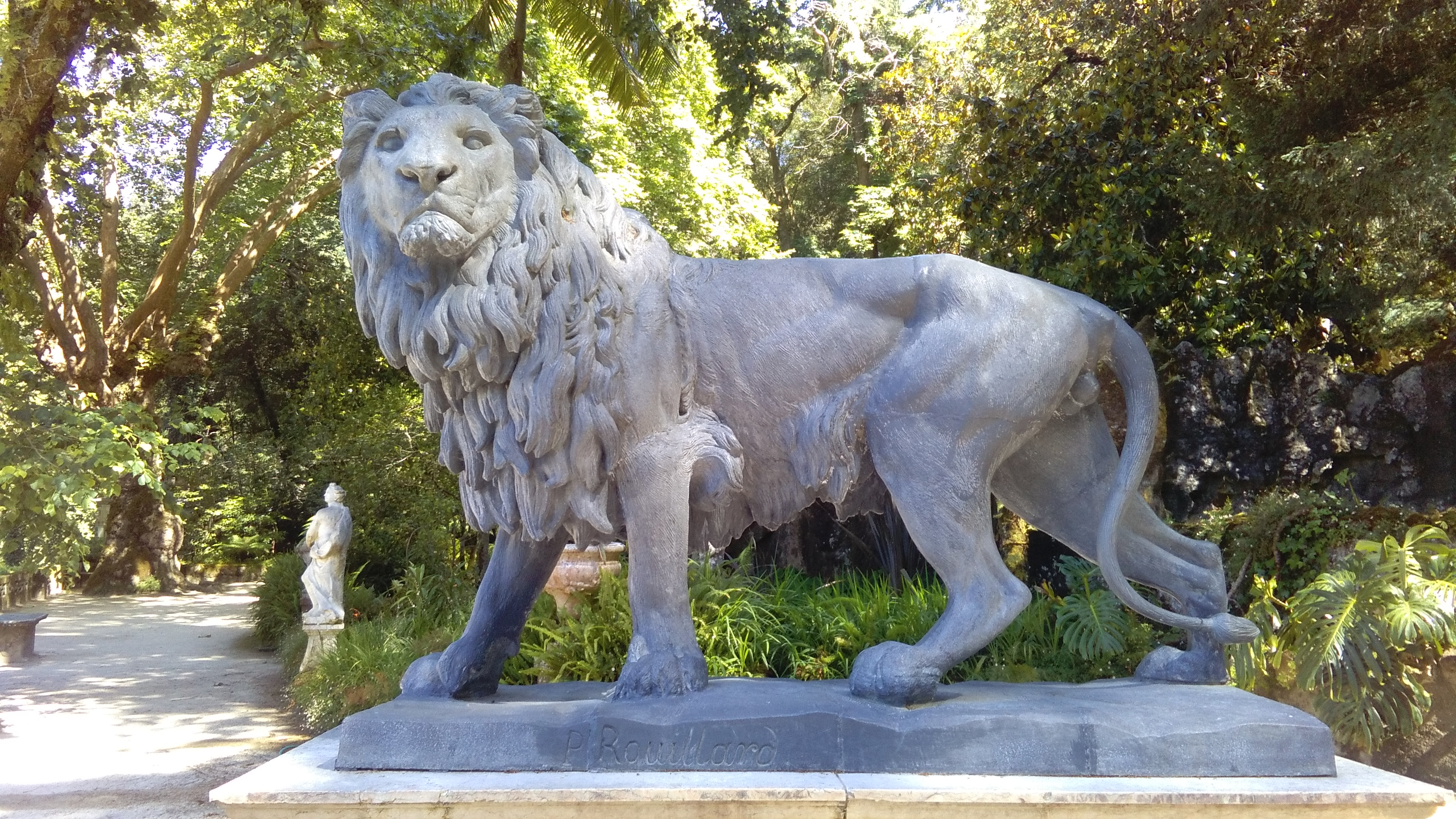
"Lion de L'Indie"

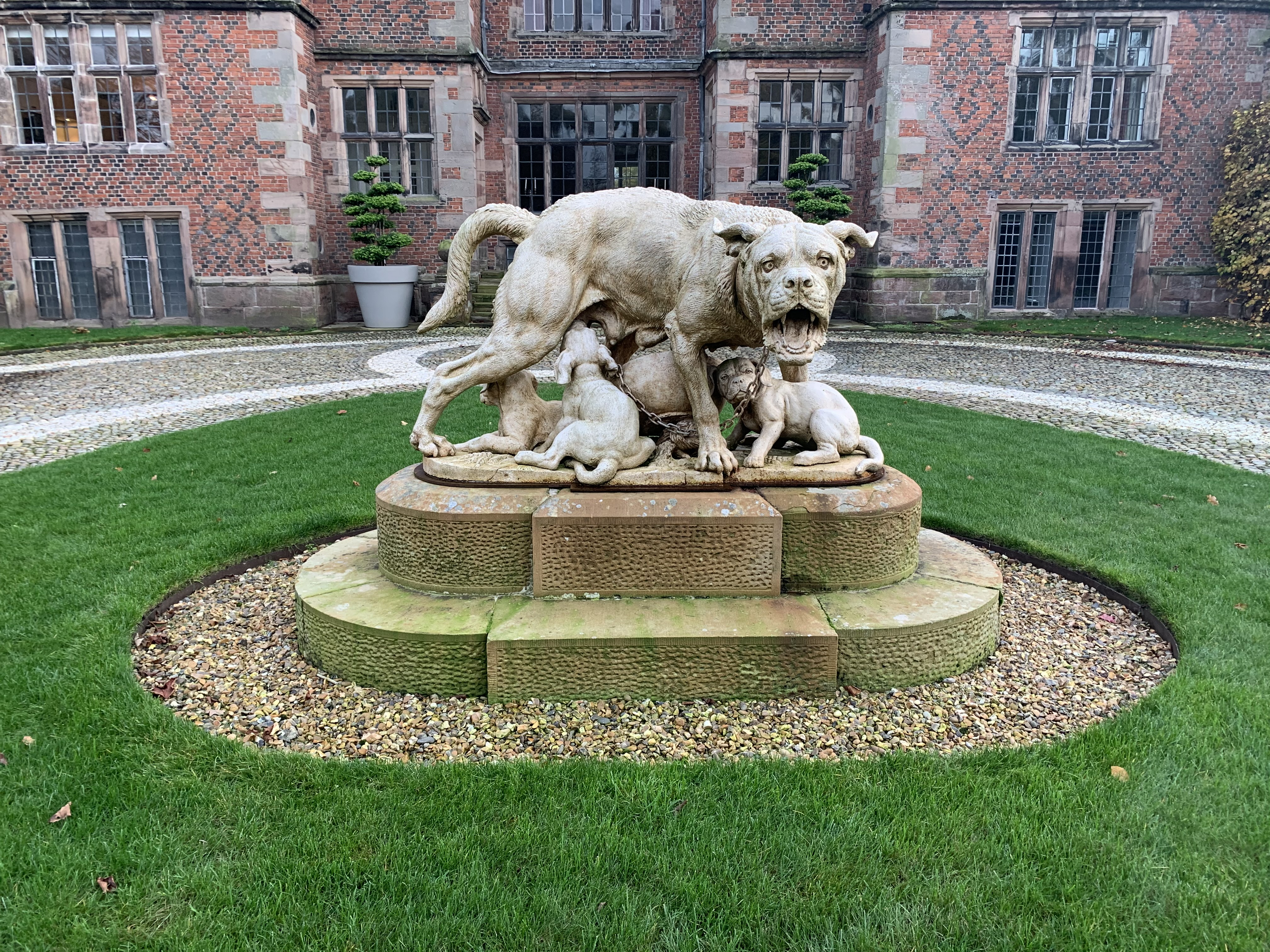
'Mastiff with puppies' at Dorfold Hall, Cheshire, England
