= Pandora, Punjab =

Pindora
- Location within Pakistan
- Coordinates: 33.39°N 73.04°E
- Country: Pakistan
- Province: Punjab
- Elevation: 505 m (1,657 ft)
- Time zone: UTC+5 (PST)

Pandora, is a village and union council of Gujar Khan tehsil in the Rawalpindi district of Punjab, Pakistan . Its location is adjacent to the Grand Trunk Road. It is located at 33°39'0N 73°4'0E with an altitude of 505 metres (1660 feet).
