= Pandora's box (disambiguation) =

Pandora's box refers to the container opened by the Greek mythological woman Pandora releasing all the evils of humanity into the world.

Pandora's box may also refer to:

== Theatre, film and television ==
- Pandora's Box (play), a 1904 German play (Die Büchse der Pandora) by Frank Wedekind
- Pandora's Box (1929 film), a film by G. W. Pabst, starring Louise Brooks
- Pandora's Box (2008 film), a Turkish drama directed by Yeşim Ustaoğlu
- Pandora's Box (2017 film), a sci-fi television film starring Corin Nemec; originally titled Doomsday Device
- Trois 2: Pandora's Box, a 2002 erotic thriller directed by Rob Hardy
- Pandora's Box (British TV series), a 1992 documentary series by Adam Curtis
- Pandora's Box (Chinese TV series), a 2021 mystery series
- "Pandora's Box" (Atlantis), a 2013 television episode
- "Pandora's Box", two-episodes story of the Mighty Max cartoon TV series
- "Pandora's Box" (Patience), a 2025 television episode
- "Pandora's Box" (Switched at Birth), a 2011 television episode
- "Pandora's Box", a 2000 episode of the CBS series Touched by an Angel (season 6), the box used as a metaphor for the Internet

=== Plot devices in other works ===
- Pandora's Box, a feature on the eleventh season of the television series Big Brother
- Pandora's box, represented as "The Pandorica", a box created to hold the Doctor in the 2010 Doctor Who episode "The Pandorica Opens"
- Pandora's Box, a magical item featured in the Once Upon a Time episode "Dark Hollow"
- Pandora's Box, present in the fourth season of the television series Warehouse 13
- Pandora, a space box with cosmic power featured in Street Fighter X Tekken
- Pandora Box, an extraterrestrial artifact to destroy numerous planets across the universe featured in Kamen Rider Build

== Music ==
- Pandora's Box (band), a 1980s American female pop group created by Jim Steinman
- Pandora's Box (album), by Aerosmith, 1991
- "Pandora's Box" (Aerosmith song), 1974
- "Pandora's Box" (Orchestral Manoeuvres in the Dark song), 1991
- "Pandora's Box", a song by Donna Summer from Love to Love You Baby, 1975
- "Pandora's Box", a song by Edguy from Age of the Joker, 2011
- "Pandora's Box", a song by NCT 127 from Neo Zone, 2020
- "Pandora's Box", a song by Nonpoint from Nonpoint, 2012
- "Pandora's Box", a song by Procol Harum from Procol's Ninth, 1975
- "Pandora's Box", a song by MARINA from Ancient Dreams in a Modern Land, 2021
- "Pandora's Box", a song by J-Hope from Jack in the Box, 2022

== Companies/Businesses ==
- Pandora's Box (BDSM), a studio in New York made famous by Nick Broomfield's documentary Fetishes
- Pandora Box (company), a Japanese video game developer for several Super Nintendo Entertainment System games
- Pandora's Box (nightclub), a club in 1960s Los Angeles

== Video Games ==
- Pandora's Box (1999 video game), a computer game created by Microsoft
- Professor Layton and Pandora's Box, the second game in the Professor Layton series

== Other media ==
- Pandora Box (comics), a Franco-Belgian comics series written by Alcante
- Pandora's Box: How Guts, Guile, and Greed Upended TV (2023), a book by Peter Biskind

== Other ==
- Pandora's Box, a prison cell built on deck of HMS Pandora
- Pandora Boxx, American drag queen

== See also ==
- Pandora Spocks, the pseudonym of Samantha's cousin Serena on the TV show Bewitched
- "Pandora's Vox: On Community in Cyberspace", an essay by Carmen Hermosillo
- Pandora (disambiguation)
