= François-Louis Dejuinne =

French painter (1786–1844)

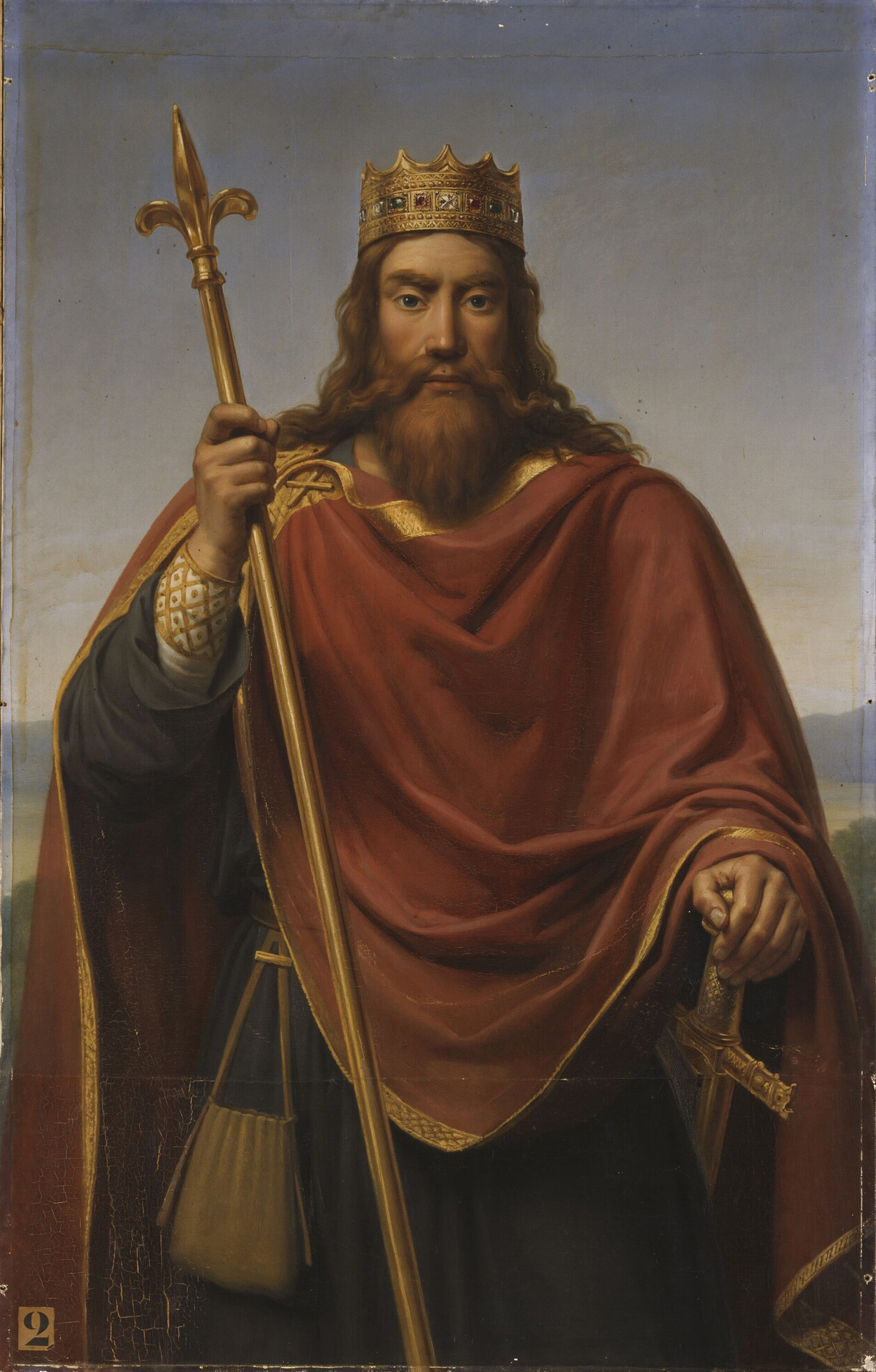
Clovis I, 1835, now at the Palace of Versailles

François-Louis Dejuinne (1786–1844) was a French painter. He was born in Paris in 1786, and learned the art of painting under Girodet. He visited Rome, where he studied the works of Titian, Paolo Veronese, and other great masters. He died in Paris in 1844. His paintings were mostly historical; among them are the 'Ascension of the Virgin ' and 'St. Geneviève ' for Notre-Dame de Lorette, and 'The Four Seasons' for the Trianon Palace.

== Selected works ==
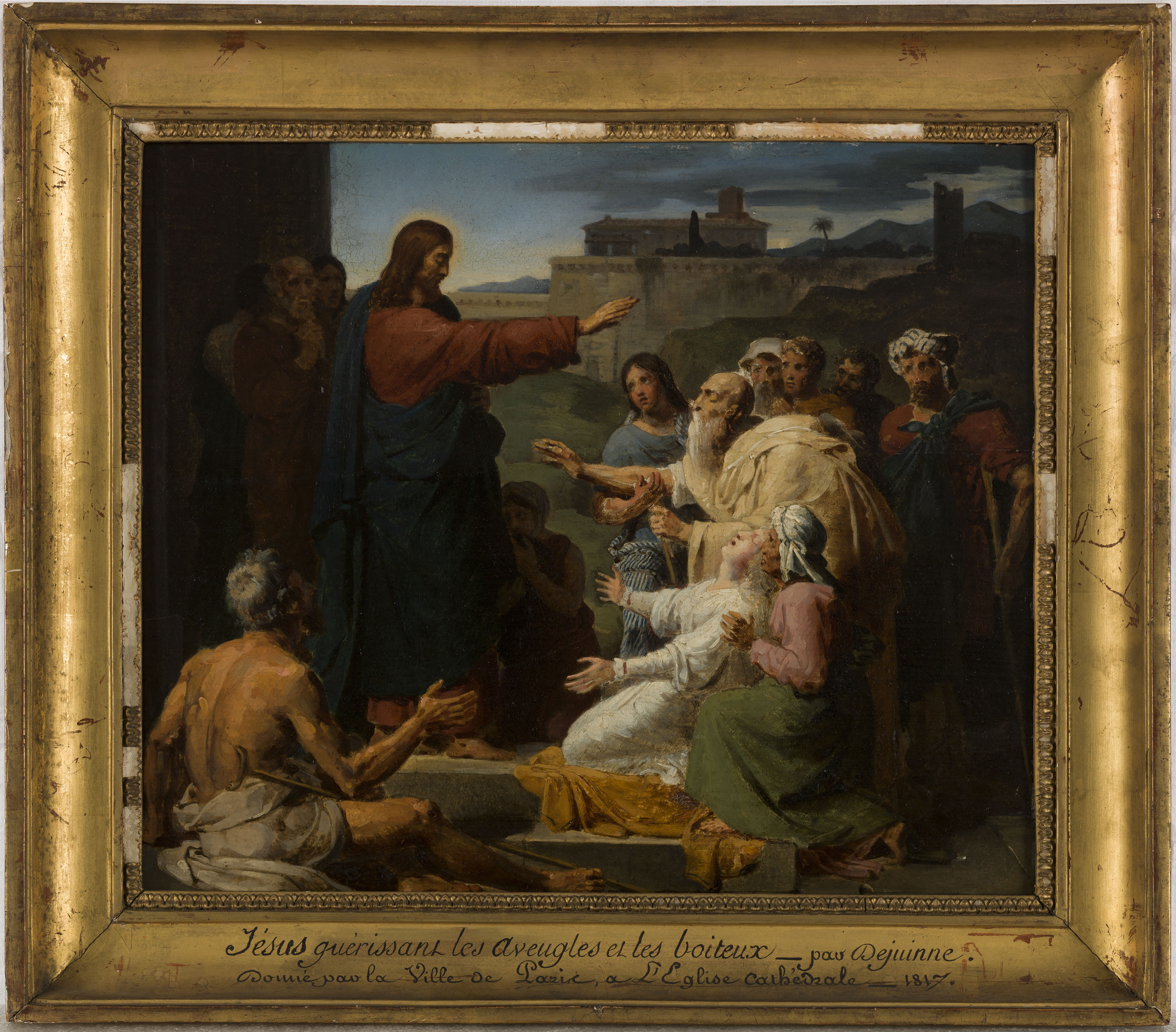
Jesus healing the lame and blind, 1817

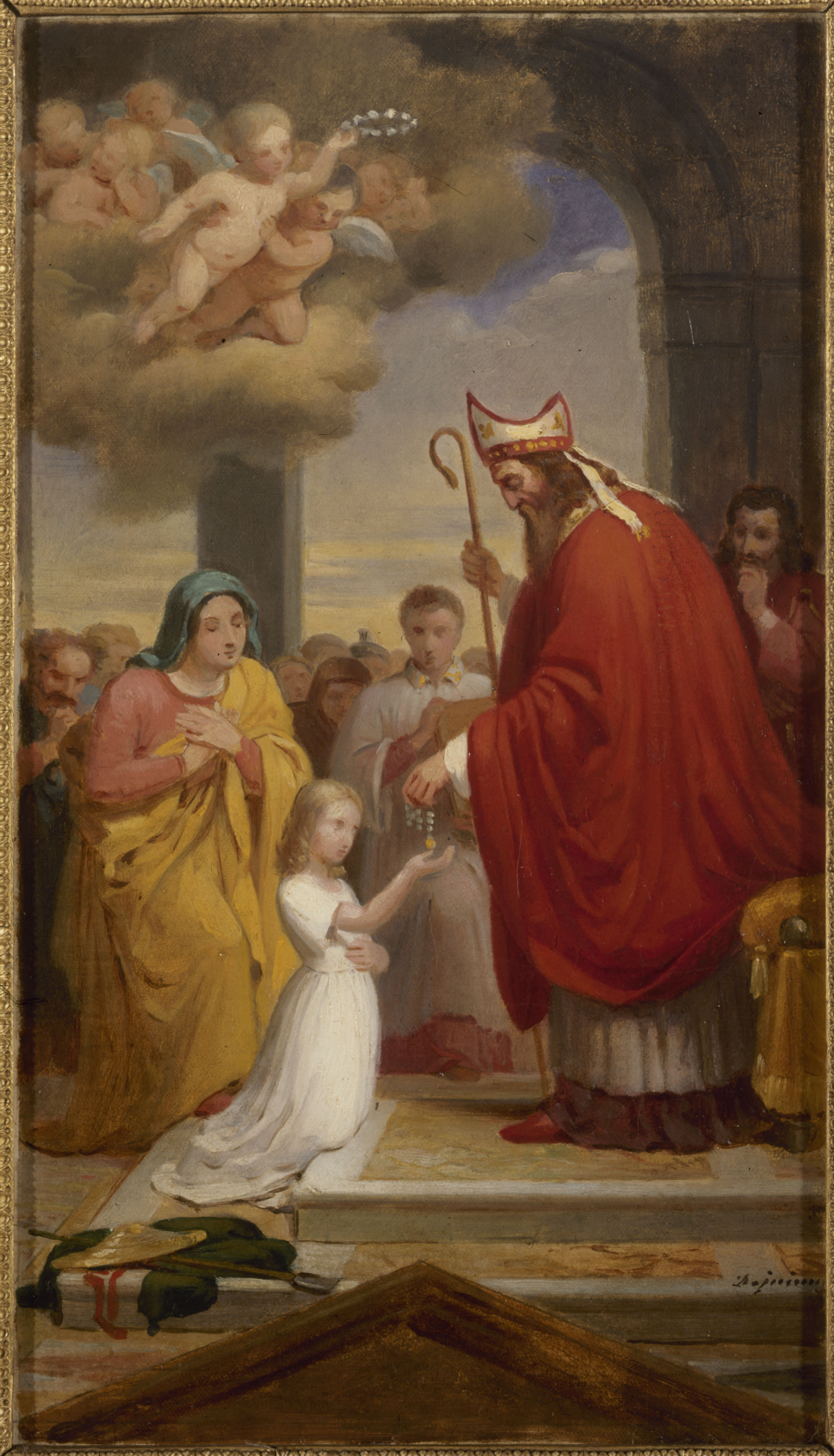
Consecration of Saint Geneviève by Saint Germain of Auxerre, 1830

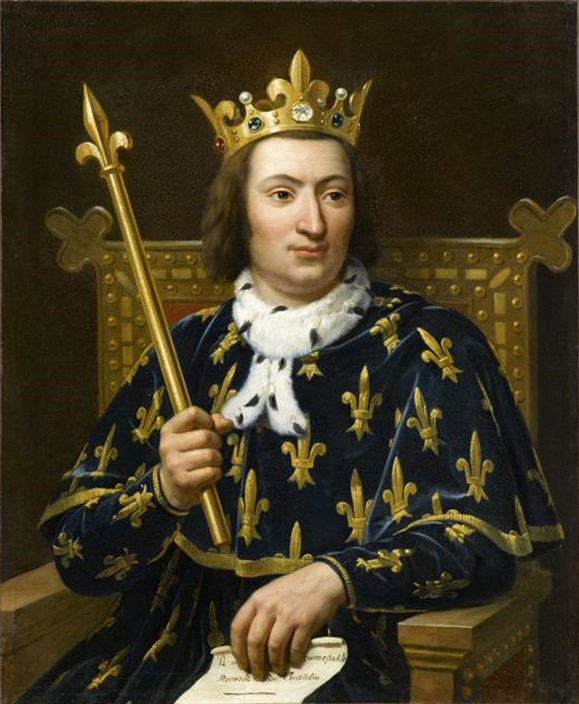
Charles V of France, 1837

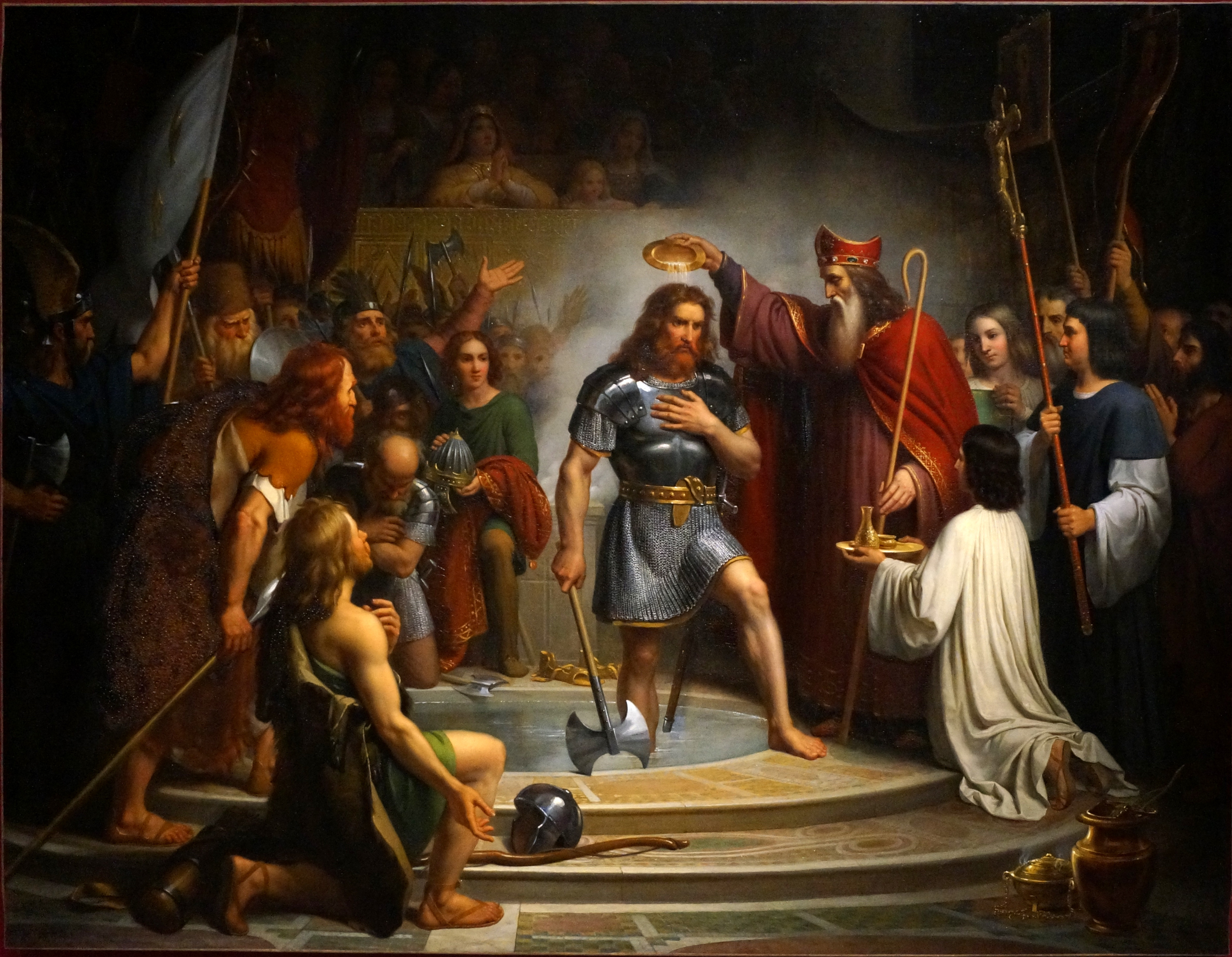
Baptism of Clovis at Reims
