= Pandora Project =

Pandora Project may refer to:

- The Pandora Project a 1998 action thriller film
- Pandora's Project, a US nonprofit organization that provides support to survivors of sexual assault
- Project Pandora, a US Department of Defense project on the possible uses of microwaves for human electronic harassment
- Pandora Project: The Logic Master, a PlayStation 1 algorithm-based simulation combat game similar to Carnage Heart
