= Ramparts of Senlis =

The Ramparts of Senlis are located in Senlis (Oise), capital of the Oise arrondissement in France. They consist of the Gallo-Roman city walls and medieval ramparts proper.

== The Gallo-Roman enclosure ==
=== History ===
The Gallo-Roman walls of Senlis are some of the best-preserved of northern Gaul. It has so far not been possible to determine when they were built, but it was however established in the 19th century that they were built after the passage of the Germanic hordes in 275–276, and after 278. But construction could have taken place anytime after that up to the beginning of the 4th century. Given research conducted on Roman walls in other European cities, we know that those in Senlis could have been built in two good years, including all of the towers.

A second construction campaign took place starting in 500 AD, focused on raising the towers with rooms. Dismantling began in 1170 with construction of Saint-Frambourg, in other words, before the medieval enclosure was built.

==== The gates and posterns ====
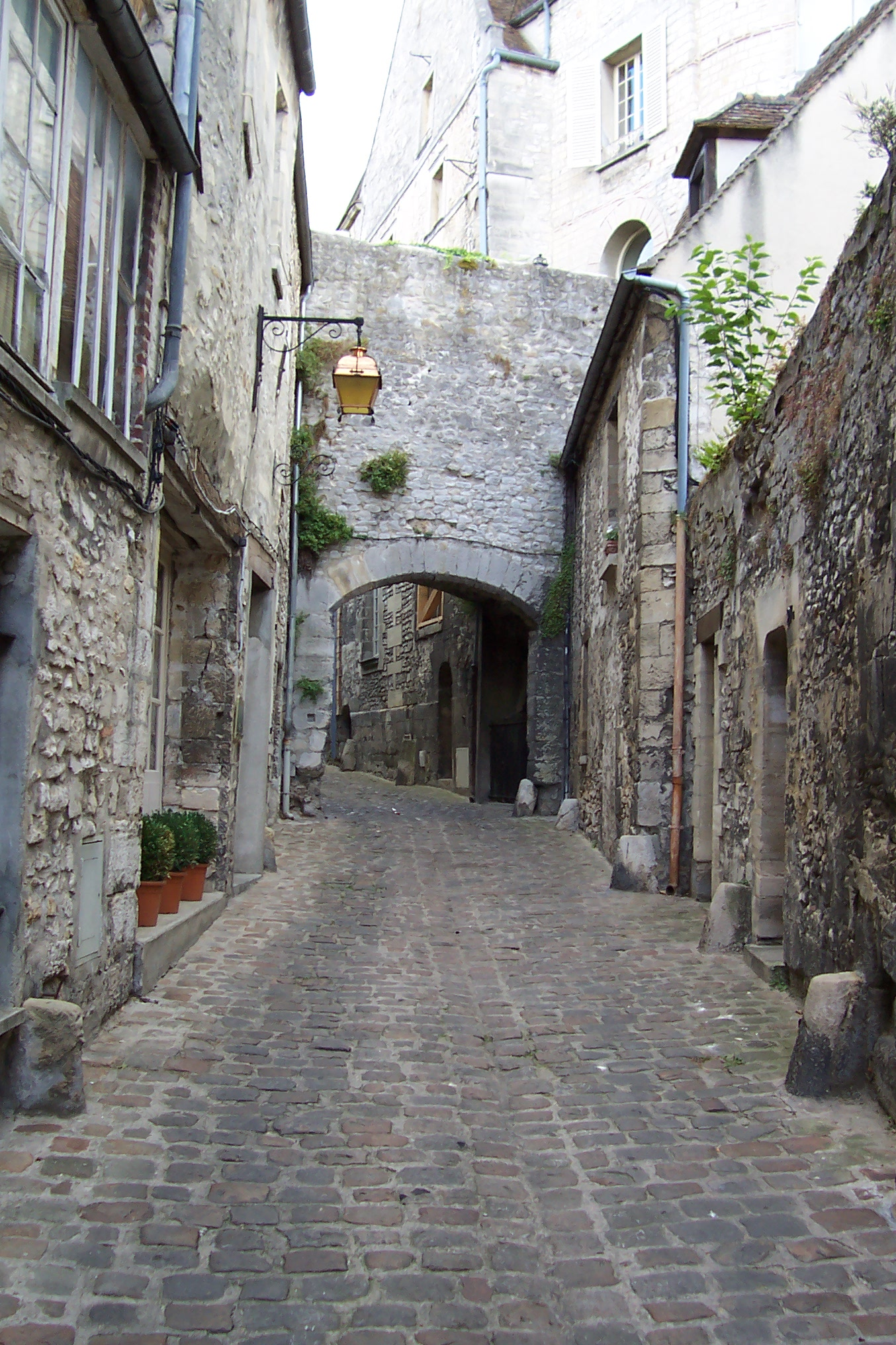
The False Gate (Fausse-Porte), a postern in the Gallo-Roman wall, widened in the Middle Ages, Rue de la Treille.

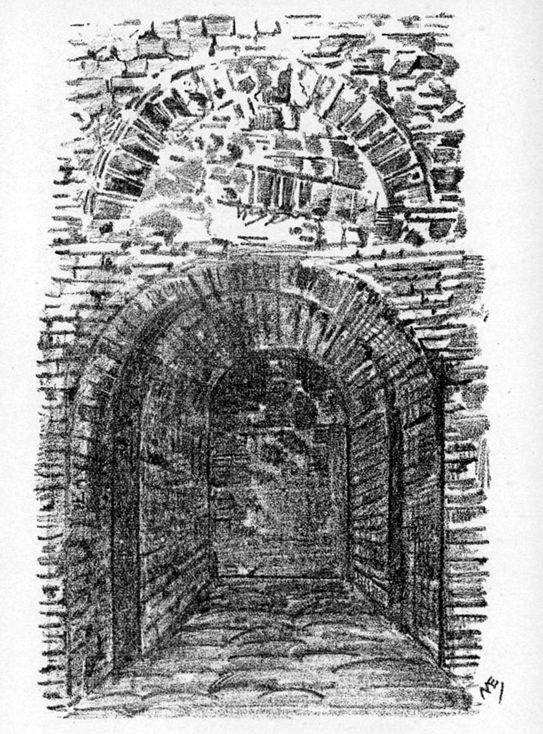
The Aiguillère postern, blocked, 1870s

=== Vestiges ===
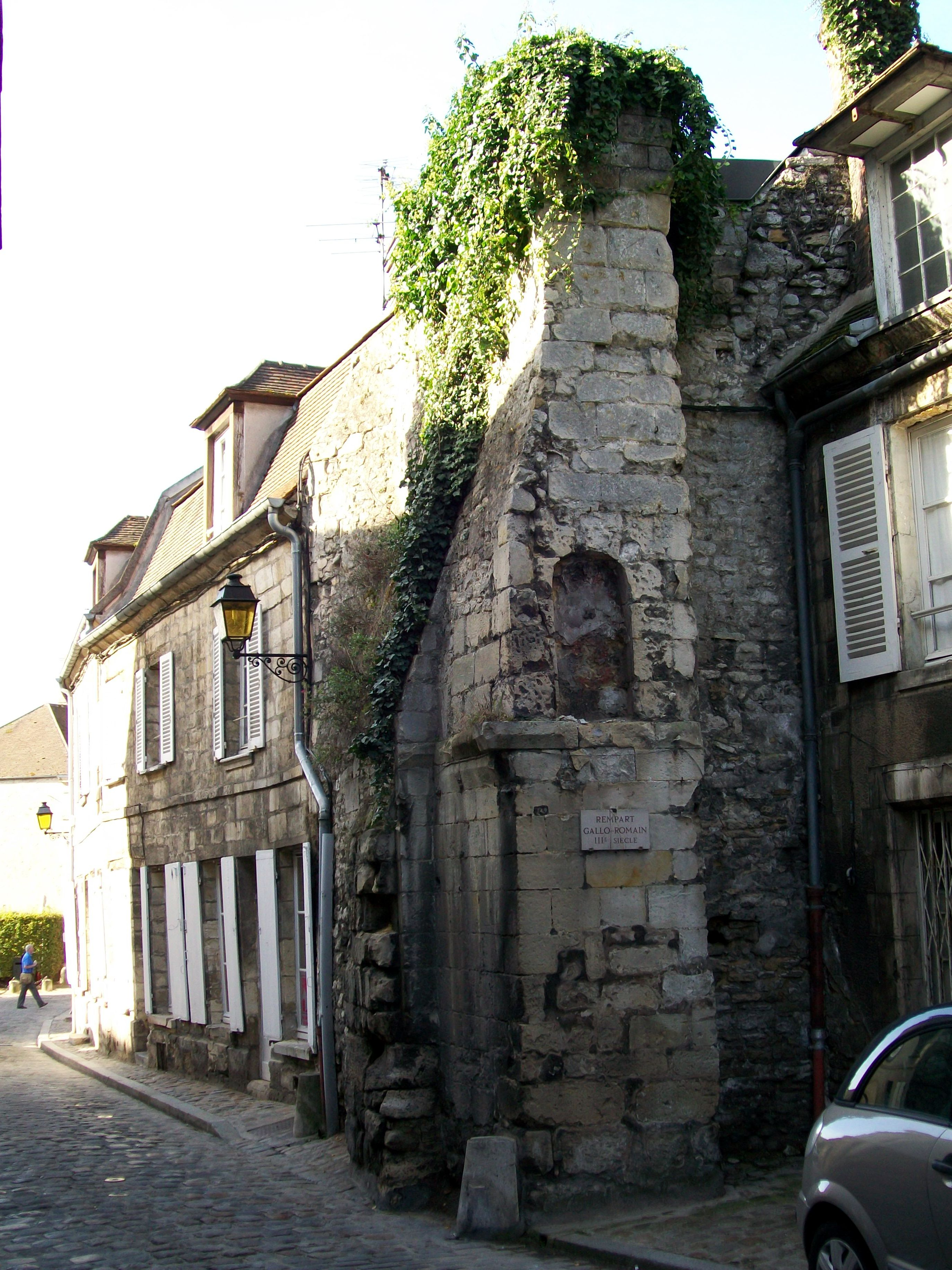
Vestige of the Saint-Rieul "false gate", Rue de Villevert, built in the Middle Ages.

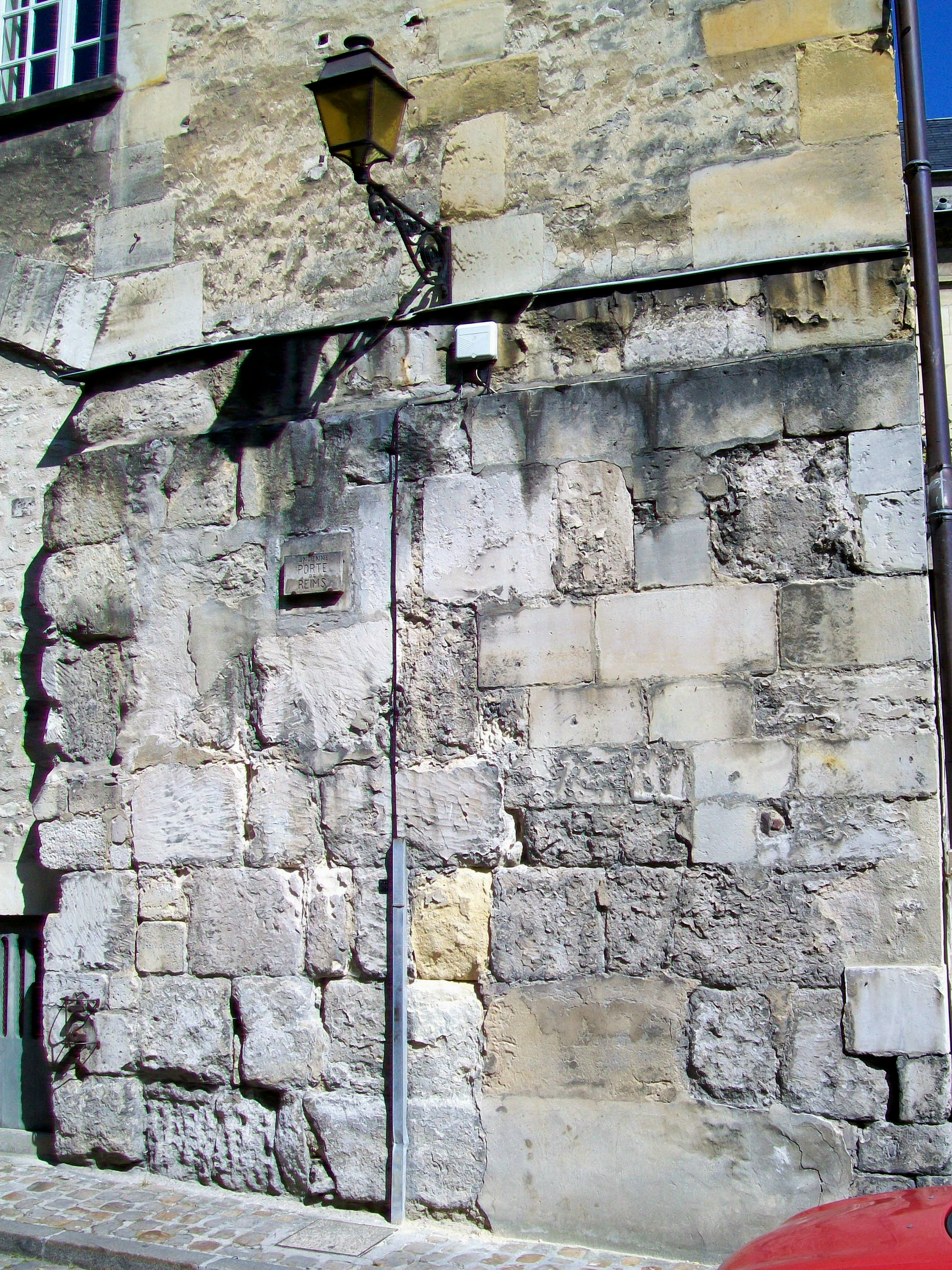
Traces of the Porte de Rheims, demolished in 1806, at the site of the former bishopric in the Rue du chancelier Guérin.

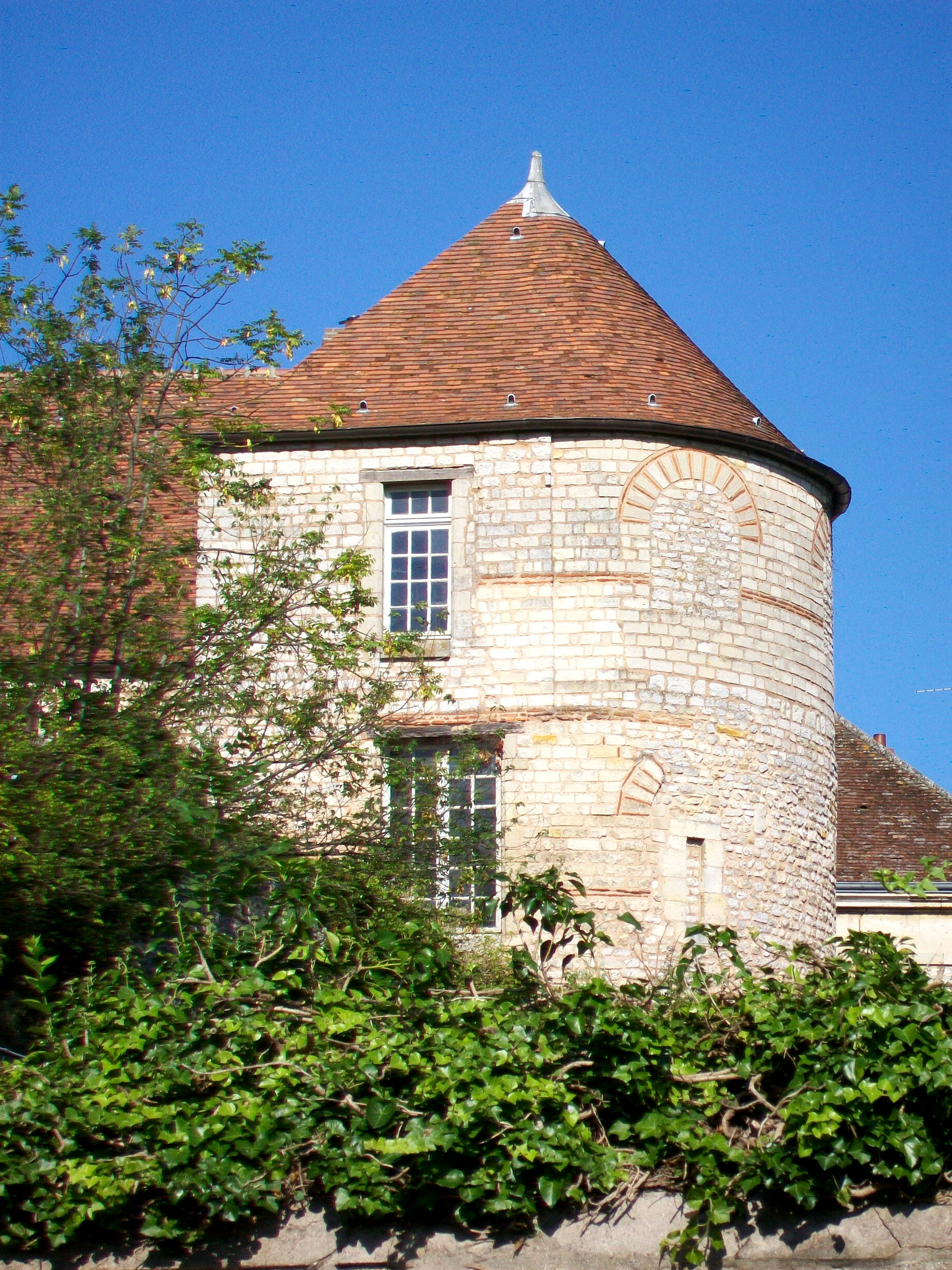
Tower #1, "Tour de Vermandois", behind the hotel of the same name.

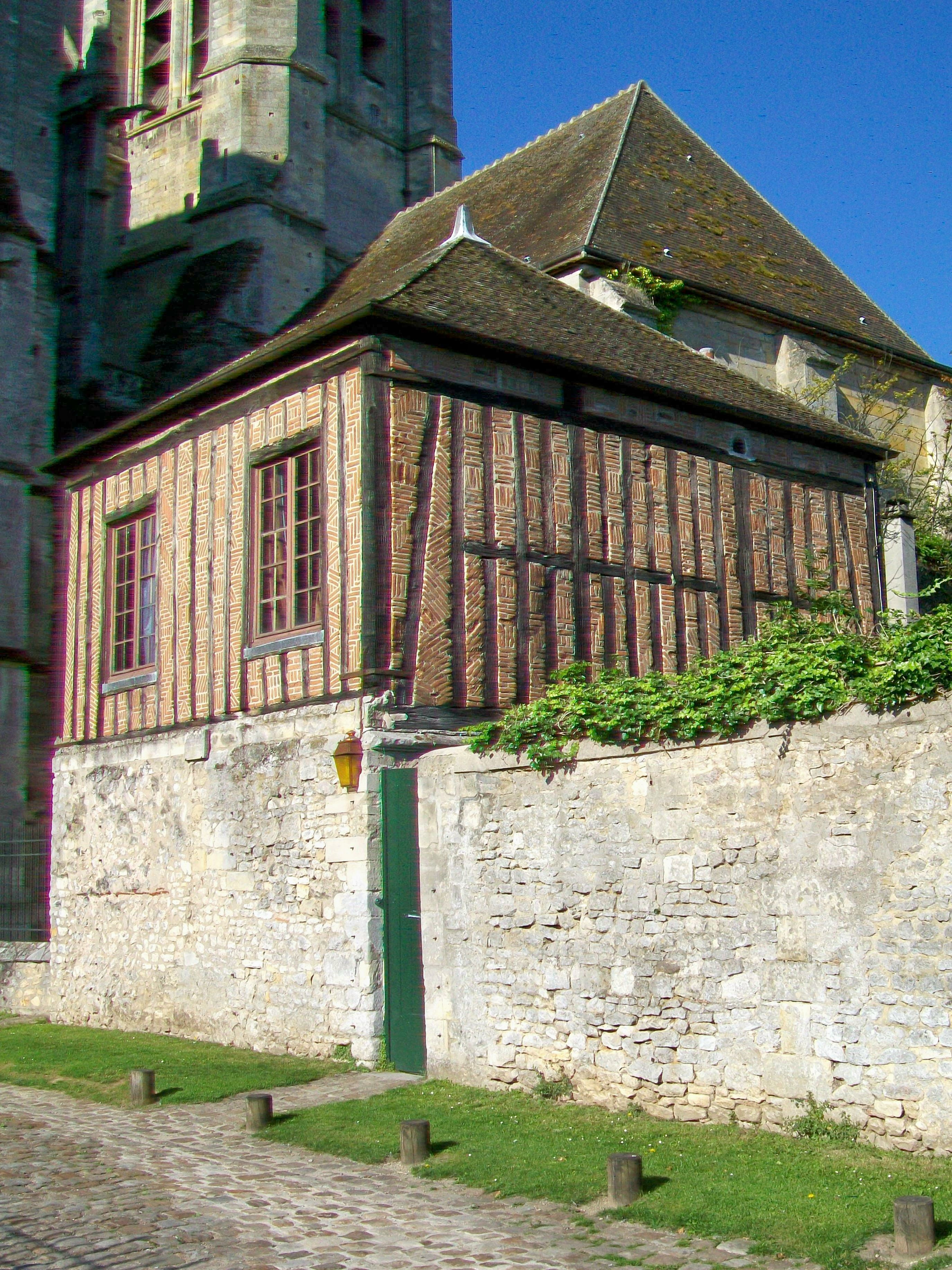
Tower #2, tour de la Bibliothèque, which serves as a base for the Notre-Dame chapter and was once its library.

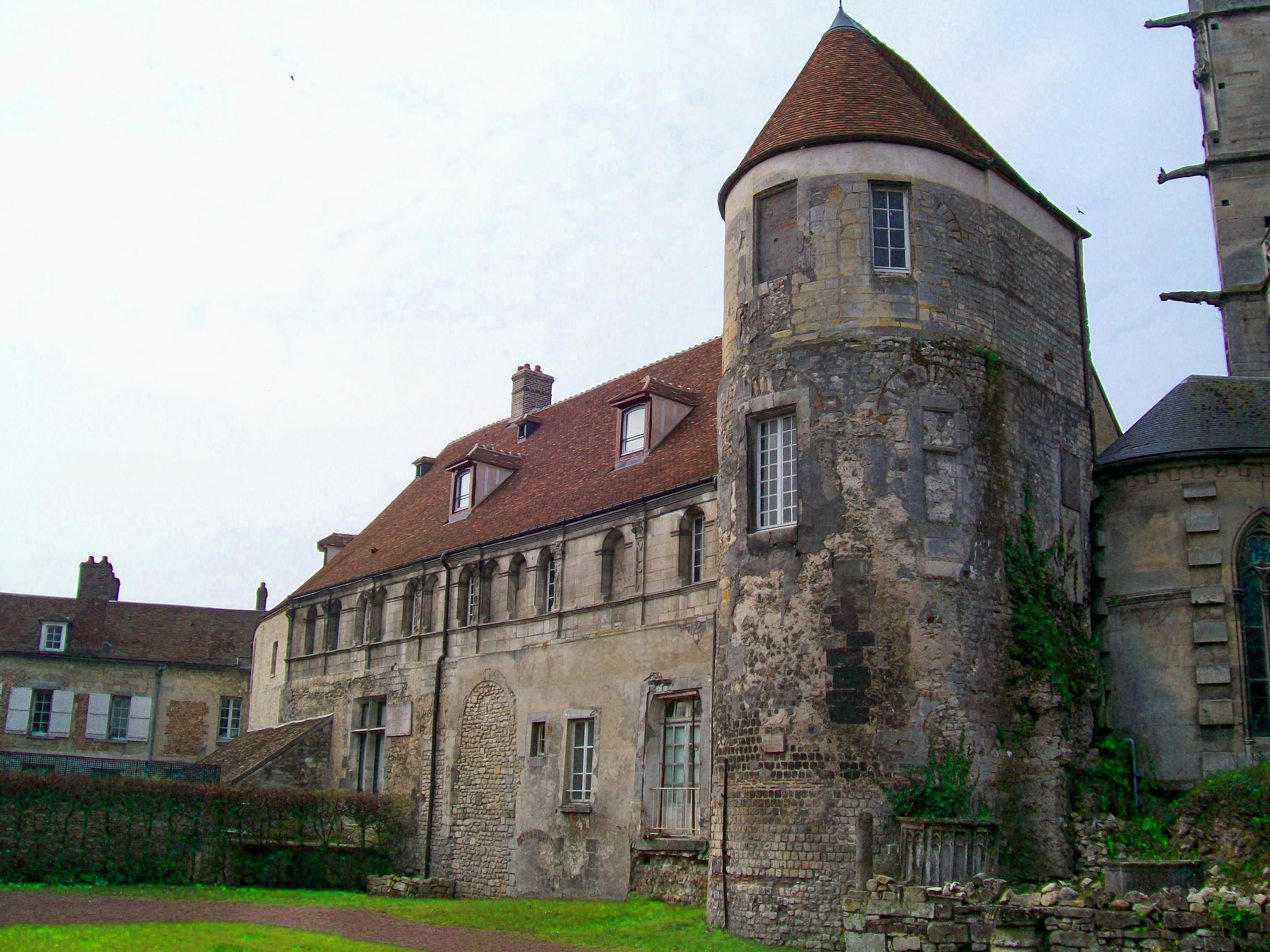
Tower #4, "Tour des Anges" (Tower of the Angels) and the remains of the Gallo-Roman wall of the former bishop's palace

Three quarters of the area of the Gallo-Roman castrum has been lost, and the construction from the Middle Ages, with its cellars and underground quarries has left only the tiniest of traces. The remainder notably corresponds to large public places and to a few private gardens, which have to date been only very partially excavated. The layout or spatial organisation of the Augustomagus of antiquity still remains unknown. The wall comprises the principal remainder of the Gallo-Roman stronghold. It is to a large extent surrounded by private property. The wall can be seen from the following public spaces within Senlis: the park of the old royal château and Square Vernet near the Collégiale Saint-Frambourg de Senlis. Outside the city, the wall can be seen from the Jardin du Roy (Garden of the King) and the garden behind the old bishopric. Other traces remain of the Porte Bellon or Rheims gate in the Rue du chancelier Guérin, and of the postern in the Rue de la Treille in the arch of the fausse porte ("false gate"—see below).

The surviving fifteen towers of the Gallo-Roman wall are as follows, clockwise from the north:

- #1, Tour de Vermandois, in the rear of the Hôtel de Vermandois, Place du Parvis Notre-Dame;
- #2, Tour de la Bibilothèque (Tower of the Library), reduced to serving as foundation for the small half-timbered building near the north door of the cathedral;
- #4, Tour des Anges (Tower of Angels), incorporated into the former bishop's residence;
- #8, Tour Saint-Hilaire, from the name of the old parish church north of the old collégiale Saint-Frambourg, (not visible from a public space);
- #10, Tour Carlier, south of Saint-Frambourg, near Square Vernet;
- #12, Tour Saint-Nicolas, immediately north of the narrow public passage leading from the Place de la Halle to the Square Vernet, inhabited, not visible from Square Vernet;
- #18, Tour Henri IV, behind and to the north of the first house on Rue Léon-Fautrat, (not visible from public areas);
- #19, Tour carrée (Square Tower), which collapsed at the end of the 19th century, and was rebuilt in a simpler form behind a house in Rue Léon-Fautrat (not visible from public areas);
- #20, Tour de la Chancellerie (Chancellery Tower), which shares a wall with the Hôtel de la Chancellerie, is currently inhabited, Rue de la Treille, and visible from the fausse porte (false door);
- #21, Tour du Puits-Tiphaine, in the garden of a house in the street of the same name, can be visited on European Heritage Days;
- #22, Tour du jardin Saint-Maurice (Tower of the St Maurice Garden), at the south-west end of the park of the former royal château;
- #24, Tour Vénerie nord (North Vénerie Tower), incorporated into a house to the west of the Musée de la vénerie de Senlis (Museum of the Hunt);
- #25, Tour Saint-Maurice, to the left of the old gate of the Saint-Maurice priory, accessible from the Place Saint-Maurice;
- #28, Tour de l'Oratoire (Oratory Tower), behind the ruined Saint-Denis royal chapel, in the park of the former royal château, disfigured by pointed-arch windows from the reign of Charles V;
- #29, Tour des Gardes (Tower of the Guards), in the middle of the ruins of the royal castle, quite visible from the Jardin du Roy on Rue du Chat-Haret.
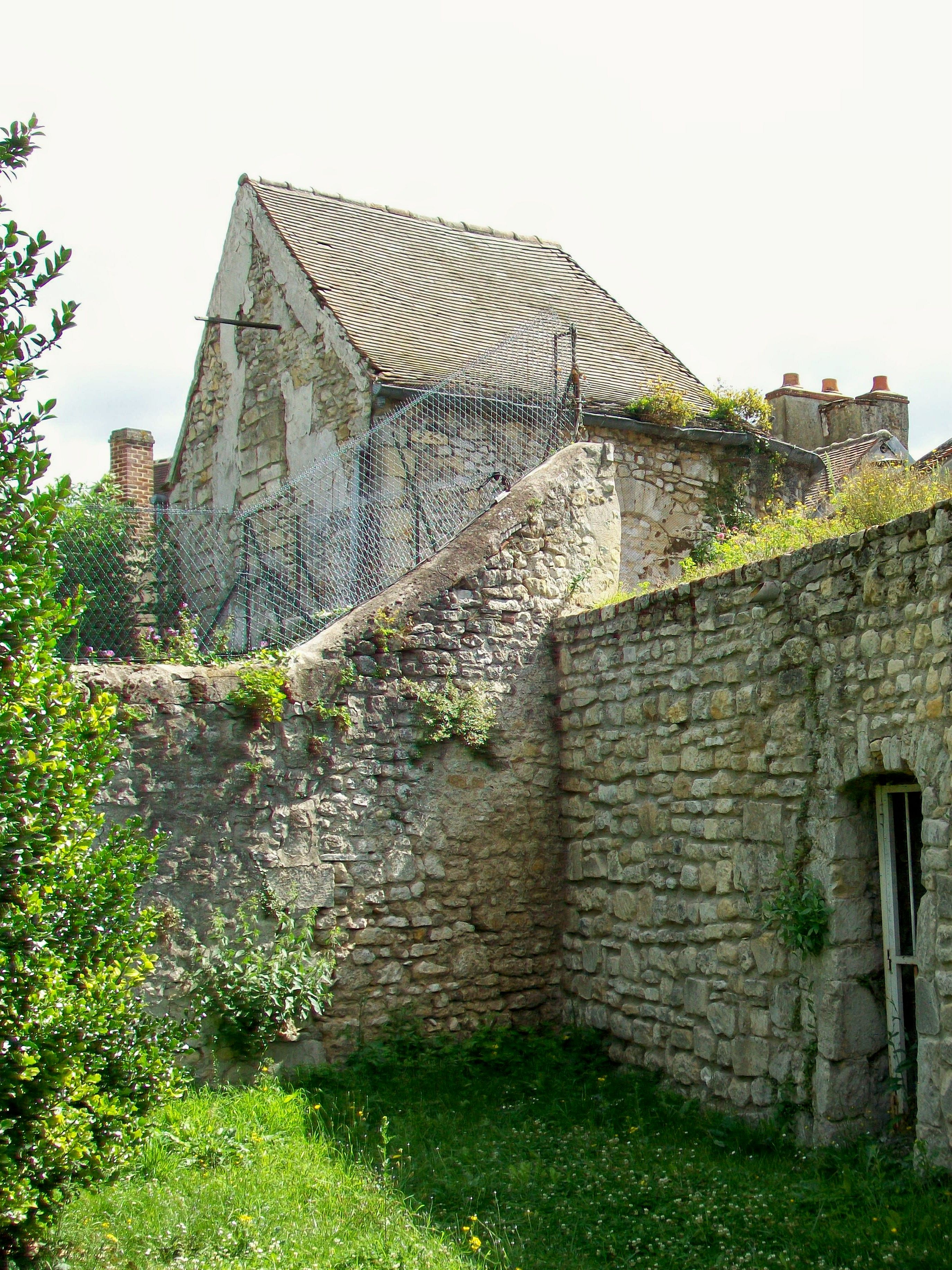
Tower # 10, Tour Carlier of the Gallo-Roman wall, south of the Saint-Frambourg collegiate church.

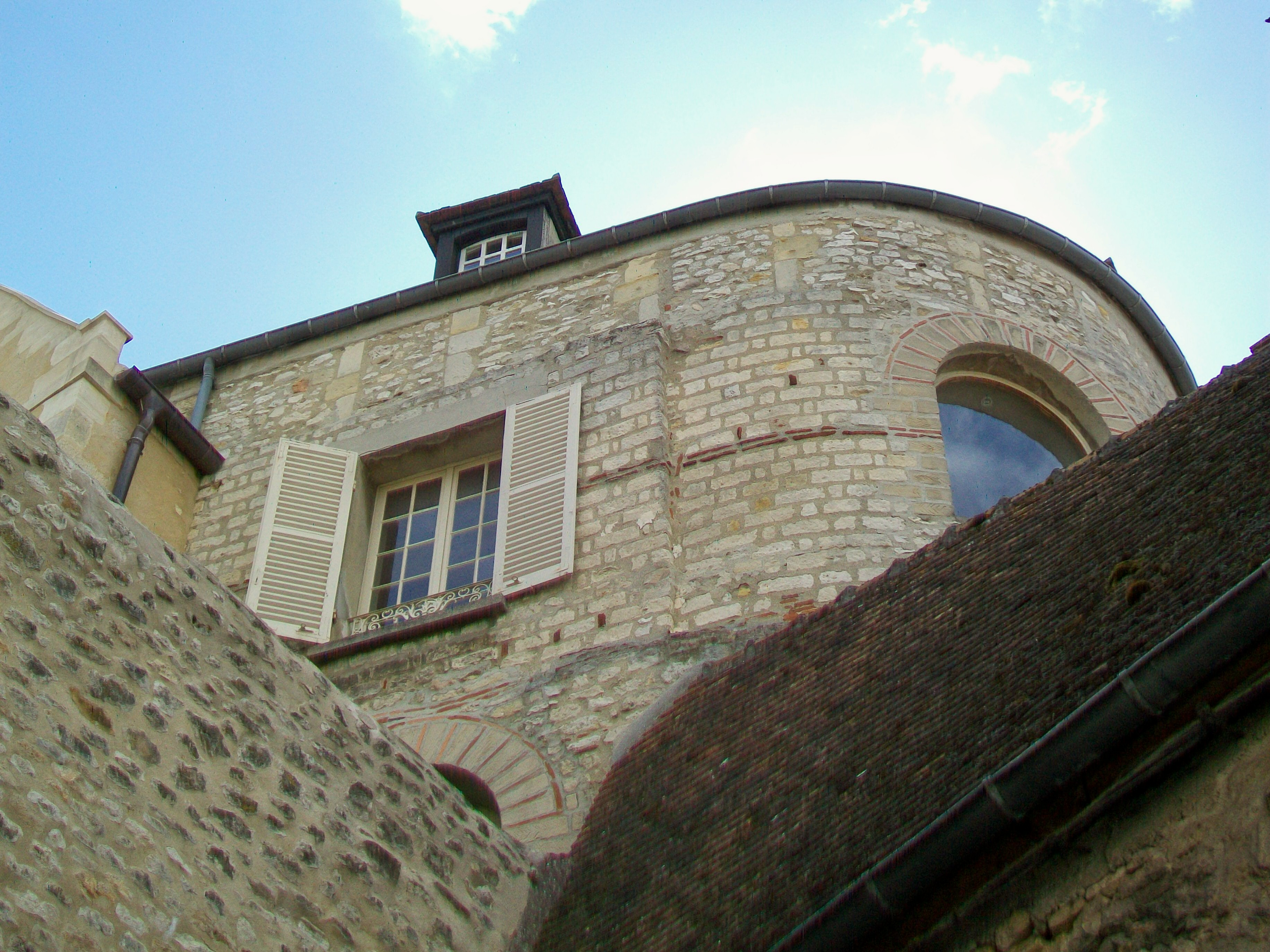
Tower 20, Tour de la Chancellerie, behind the hotel of the same name in Rue de la Treille.

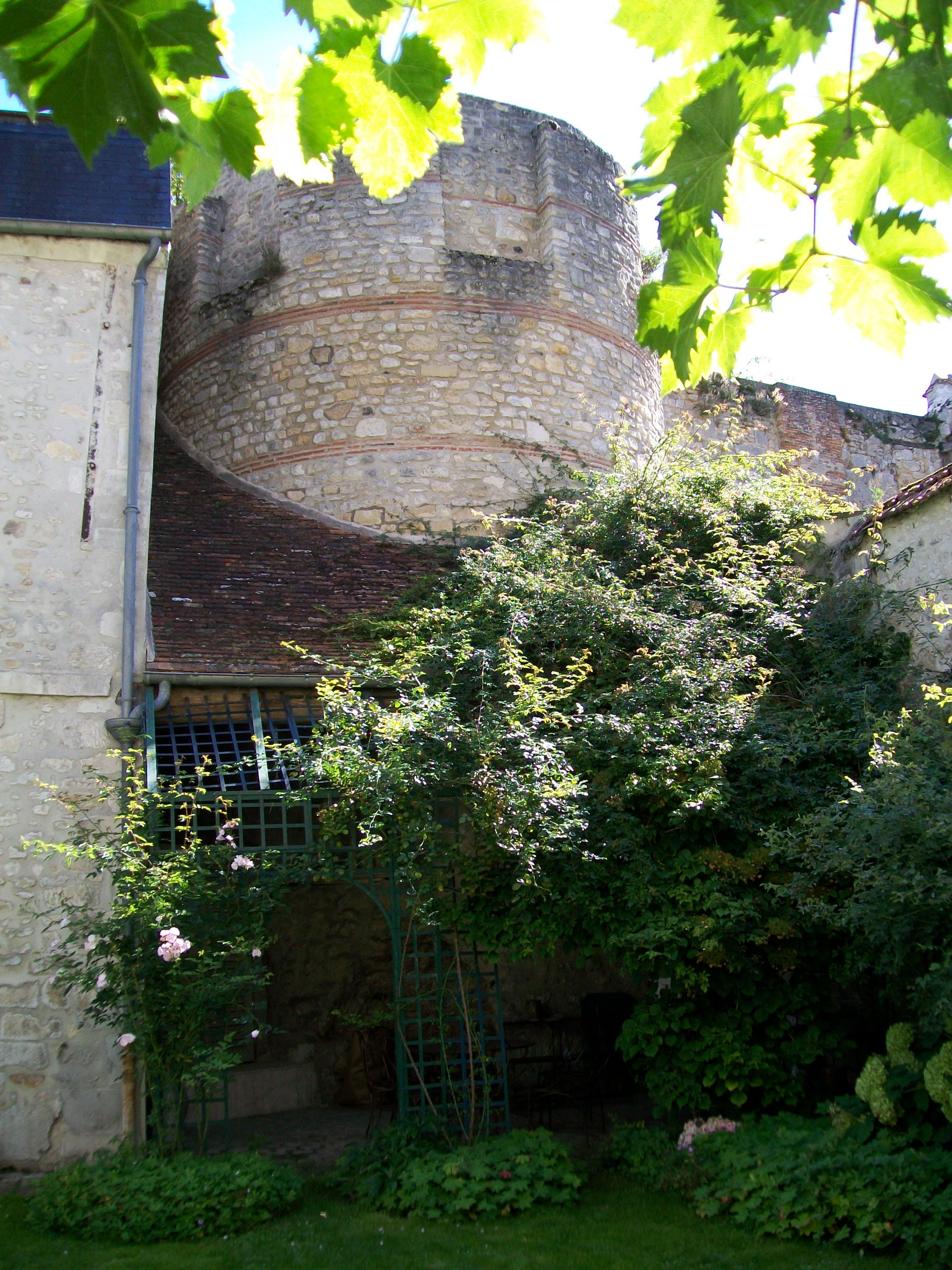
Tower 21, Tour du Puits-Tiphaine in a garden at 10 Rue du Puits-Tiphaine.

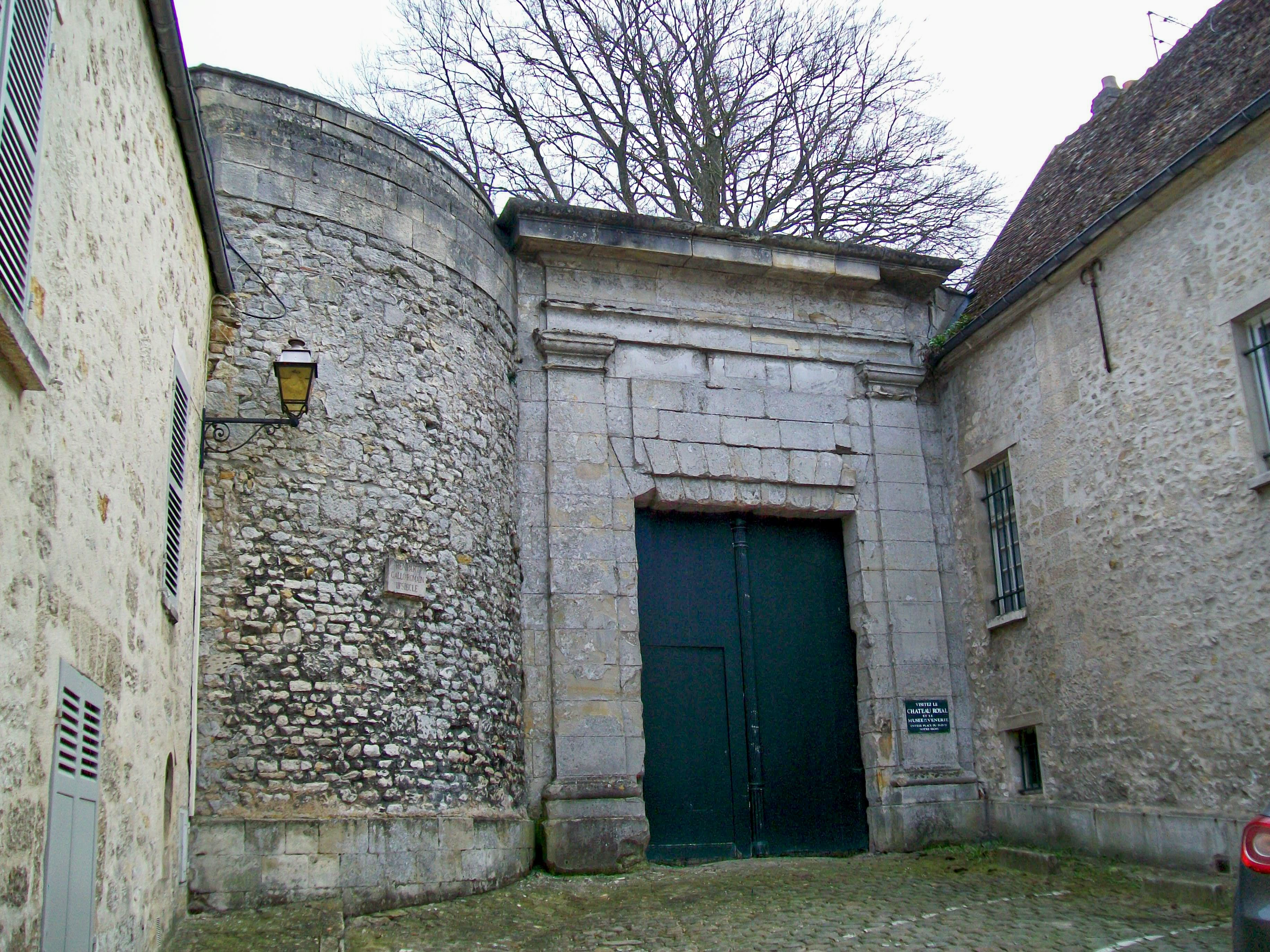
Tower 25, Tour Saint-Maurice, to the left of the western gate of the château garden.

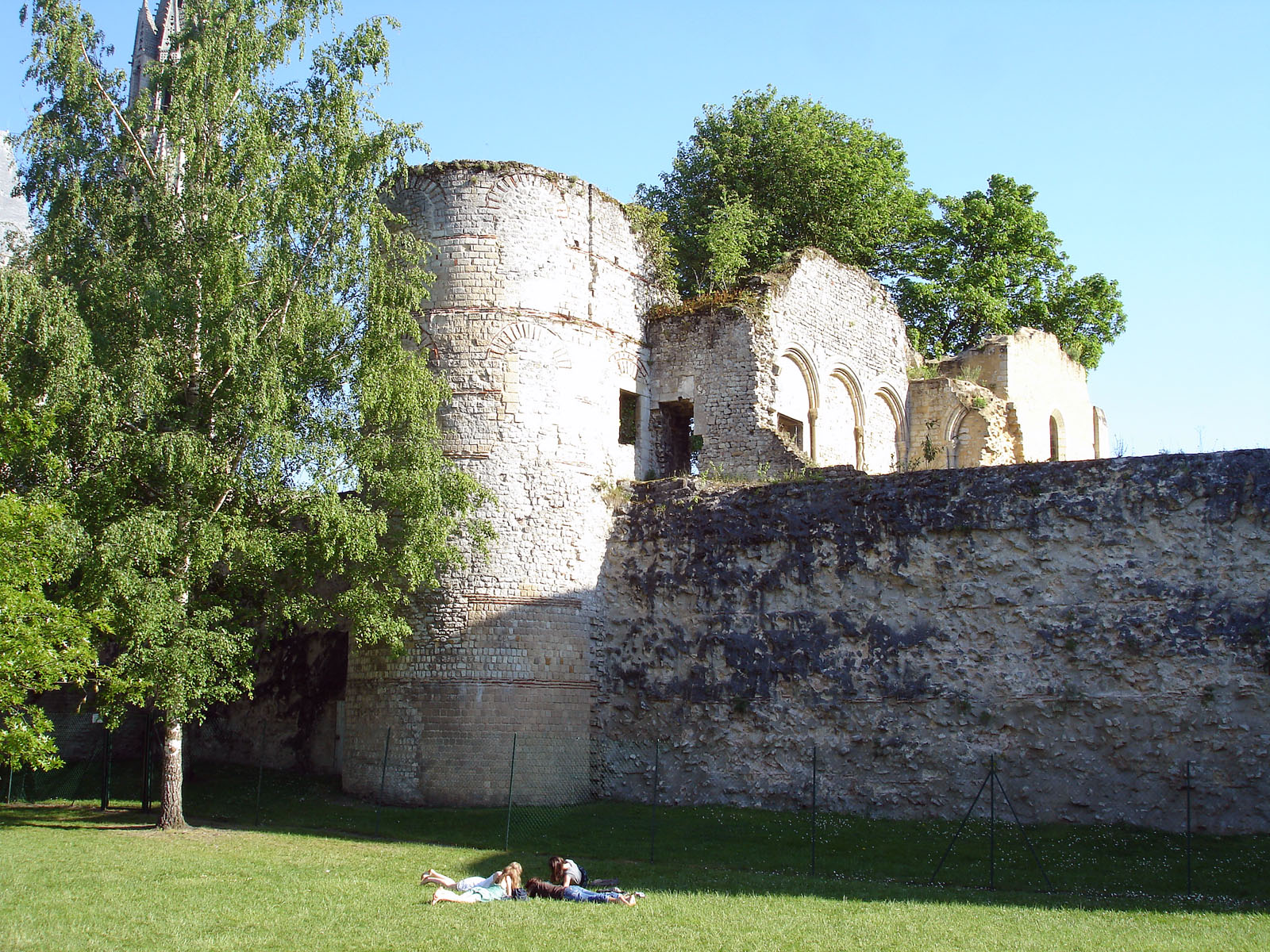
The Gallo-Roman rampart with tower # 29, Tour des Gardes in the Jardin du Roy.

==== The city gates ====
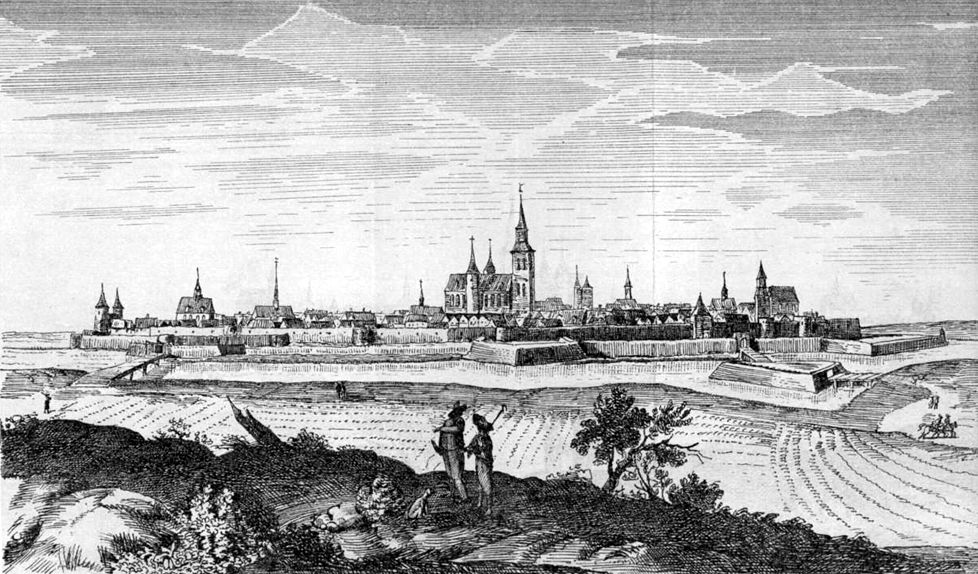
View of old Senlis with its fortifications.

The city gates in the medieval ramparts are listed below in clockwise order, from the north. The city gates did not all exist at the same time, but there were never less than four. Some confusion may result from difficulties interpreting old documents, which sometimes use synonyms to refer to the same gate, or do not clearly distinguish between a gate—open to road traffic—and a postern gate—solely used by pedestrians. None of the gates of the medieval enclosure survive today, and the only known images of them date from a period when demolition of the walls had already begun.

Between 1383 and 1402, municipal registers mention four gates:

- (Saint-Rieul,
- de Meaux,
- de Paris
- de Creil).

In 1480, a total of nine gates and posterns were enumerated. Only the Weavers' Postern Gate (des Tisserands), which still exists today, had not been built yet, nor the Porte de Compiègne. In 1544 however, the Porte aux Ânes (Donkey Gate) was one of the five gates of the city., which implies that at least one of the above gates had been either blocked off or reduced to a postern gate, at least temporarily.

- The Aiguillère postern: its existence in 1480 is confirmed by the report on the visit of Lieutenant-General Nicolas Manessier. It was blocked off as a precaution long before 1588, and replaced by a buttress to protect the neighboring Creil and Saint-Rieul gates. Vestiges of the postern were still visible in 1756. The Rue de la Porte Aiguillère, which links the Rue du Chat-Haret to Boulevard Pasteur east of the Anne-Marie Javouhey School, today is its only legacy. However, the course of this alley changed to the south: it initially led to Place Saint-Maurice, through the school's current holdings.
- Porte Saint-Rieul was on Boulevard Pasteur, near the north end of Rue de Villevert. This street took a right turn and ran west until it reached the gate, which was aligned parallel to the ramparts, as was the bridge over the trenches. We should speak of Porte Saint-Rieul in the plural, for there was an inner gate, called Porte Haute or High Gate, and an outer gate, called the Porte Basse, or Low Gate. Porte Saint-Rieul was one of the four oldest gates, and named for the large church demolished in the wake of the French Revolution, whose memory survives in the name of a parish in Senlis. Its existence in 1480 in confirmed by the report of the visit of Lieutenant-général Nicolas Manessier. It was rebuilt in 1500; possibly just the low gate was added. In 1554 the 11th-century High Gate was rebuilt when the buttress was built. The gate still existed at the end of the final construction project between 1588 and 1598. The Gothic-style low gate was imposing, three storeys high and topped with machicolation, and bore an enormous coat of arms. The building must have been flanked by towers, since the oldest representations of it (ca. 1800) show vestiges of lateral shared walls. There was also a smaller lateral door for pedestrians. The high gate on the other hand had a romantic aspect, recalling the gateway to a farm. The ground floor contained only the gate and adjoining gatehouse, and was half-timbered. The entire structure was demolished in 1828.
- The Weavers' postern is the only remaining medieval postern. It was two-laned, as one can still see when approaching it from Rue de la Poterne. The street ends at the postern gate and becomes the very short Rue du Dos d'Âne (Street of the Donkey Back), which goes as far as the Nonette River. The postern's function was to give weavers and tanners access to the river to wash their skins and fabrics. The history of the postern gate is little known, possibly because it never played an important role in the city's defense.
- The buttress at the Porte de Creil, on the site of Place des Arènes, at the end of the Rue de Beauvais;
- The buttress of the Champ de Marché (Market Field), under boulevard Pasteur, at the end of rue Anne-Marie Javouhey;
- The buttress of the Porte Saint-Rieul, at the end of rue Villevert;
- The Saint-Sanctin buttress, to build which, the Saint-Sanctin chapel and the chantrerie of Saint-Rieul were demolished, at the end of Rue Saint-Pierre;
- The promontory of the Bellon gate, or crossroads of the Obélisque, where Rue Bellon meets Saint-Yves-à-l'Argent, was demolished in 1829;
- The promontory of the Porte de Meaux or bastion of the Porte de Meaux, at the southeastern edge of the Saint-Vincent, a massive and imposing work;
- L'éperon des Dames, (Ladies' Buttress) in front of the Poterne des Tisserands (this site remains visible);
- The buttress of the Porte de Paris (Paris gate), at the end of the old Rue de Paris, was demolished in 1829.

=== Protection ===
The remaining vestiges of the porte de Meaux were registered as historic monuments with a decree April 5, 1930. The medieval ramparts were added to the register of historic monuments by two decrees on May 8, 1933, one concerning the Tour du Jeu d'arc, and the other the ramparts as a whole., and the site was registered by decree on 17 December 1948. on This registration was particularly concerned with the boulevards et promenades ceinturant la ville sur une longueur d'environ 2700 mètres (approximately 2700m of boulevards and walkways circling the city), and included both public and private property. Also, the line of the medieval ramparts was used to define the limits of the historic preservation sector of Senlis, declared by the decree of 20 September 1965. Curiously, the areas outside the ramparts were not included in the preservation area, and restoration of the vestiges of the medieval wall was apparently not envisaged.

=== Vestiges ===
The demolition of the Senlis fortifications primarily concerned the gates, towers, bastions, buttresses and trenches. The ramparts proper still survive for most of their length, whether in close to their original state, as they are in a few rare places, or in ruins. These ruined vestiges are entirely accessible on foot, on a moped or even in a car, where the rempart des Otages is concerned since it has been transformed into a road (Boulevard des Otages and Boulevard du Montauban). On the other hand, the vicinity of the external face of the ramparts is inaccessible to the public, as it is now made of private gardens.

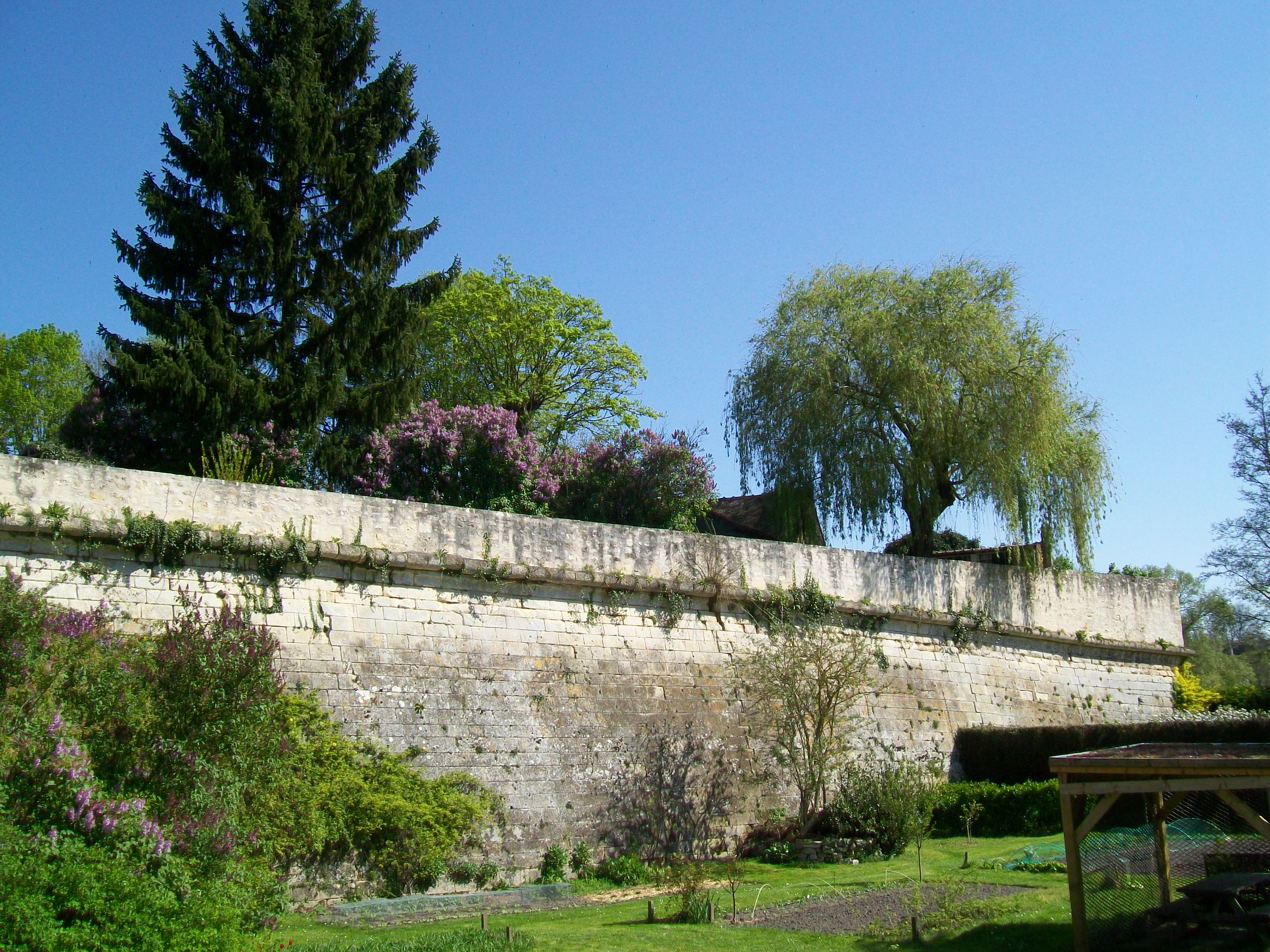
Bastion of the 1544 Porte de Meaux, seen from the Porte de Meaux.

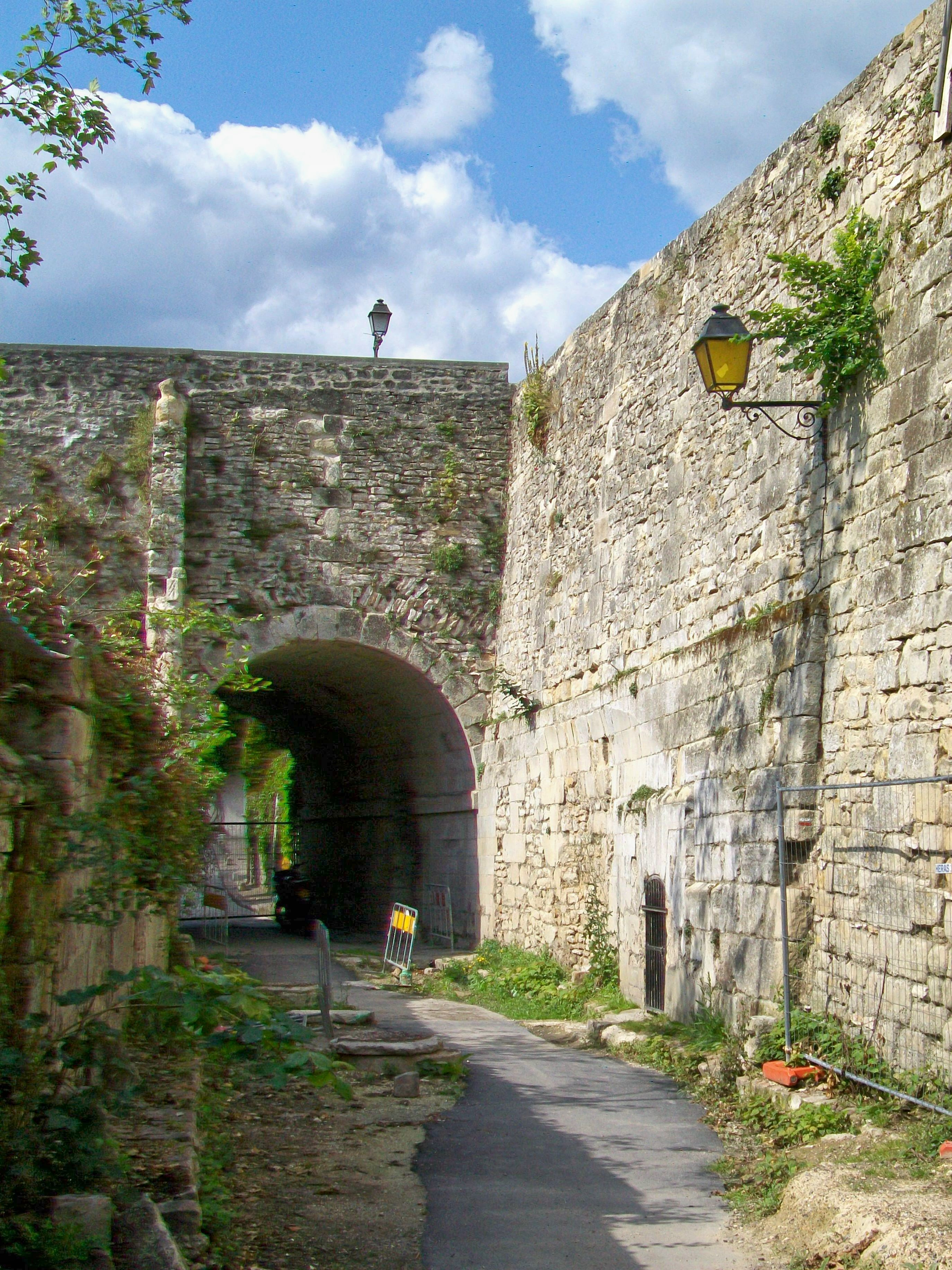
Traces of the Porte de Meaux - interior, seen from outside the city.

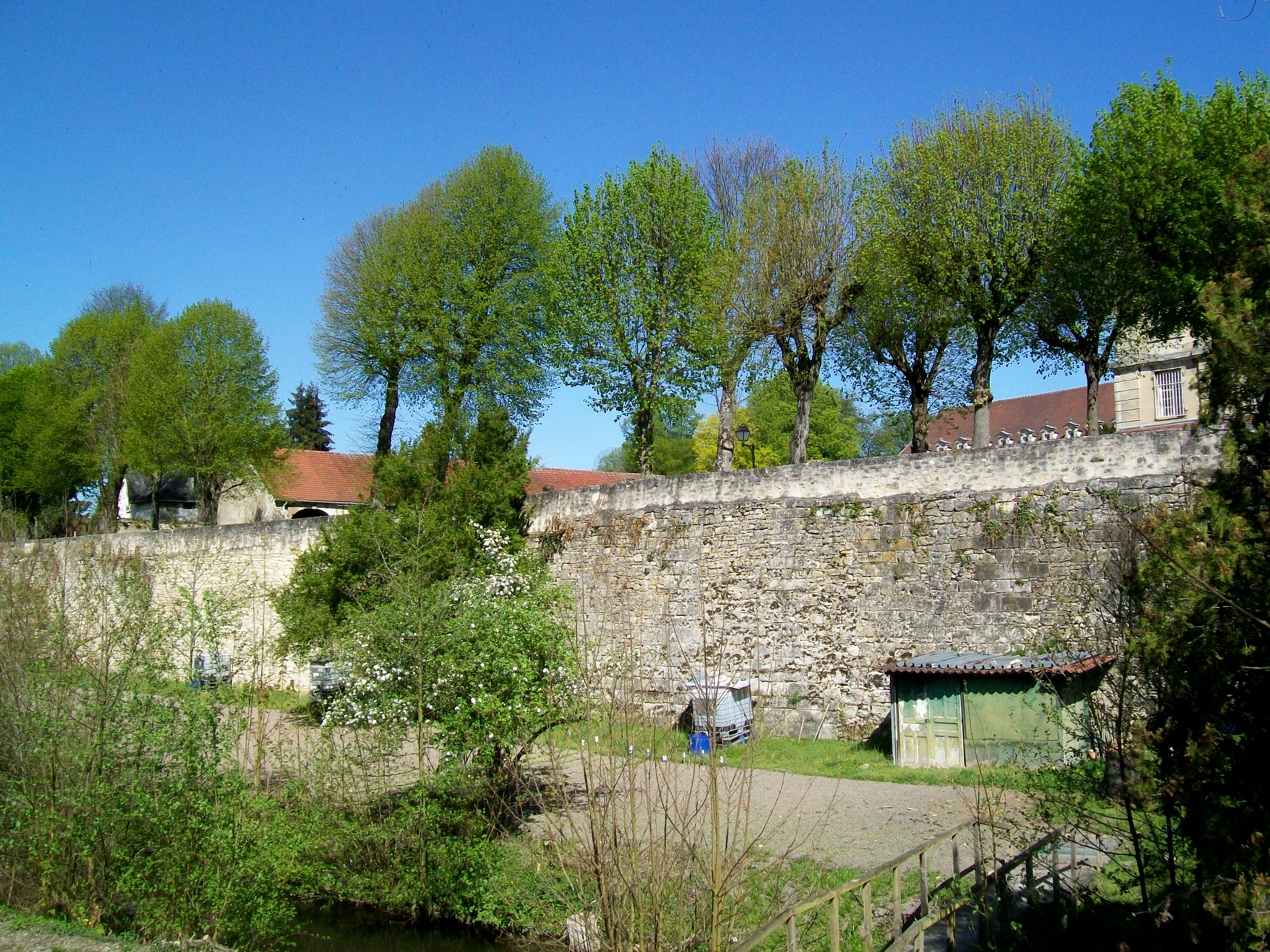
The Bellevue rampart from Impasse Marguerite. This is where the medieval walls have remained the tallest.

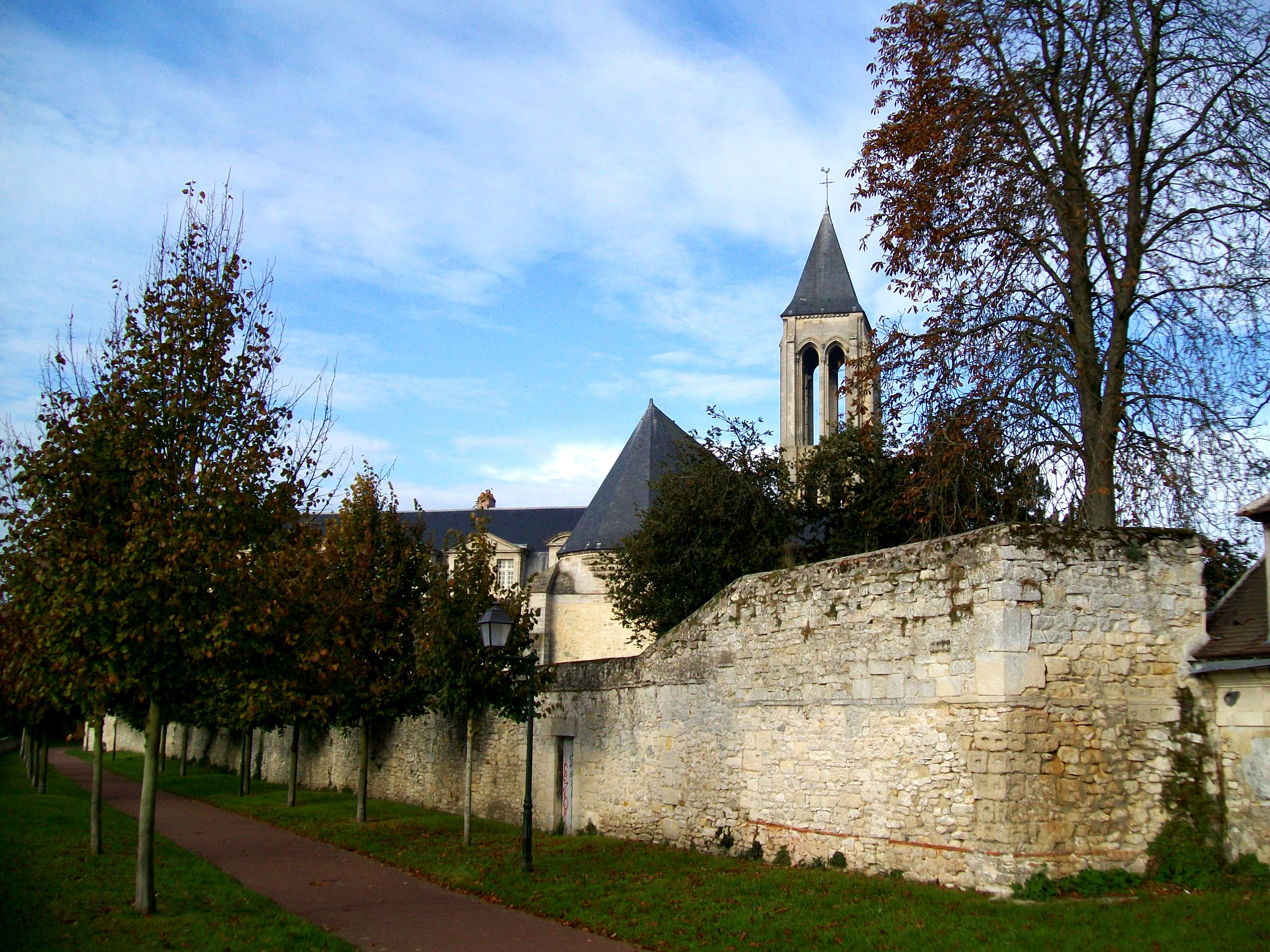
Walkway on the Bellevue rampart, vue sur St-Vincent Abbey and its church.

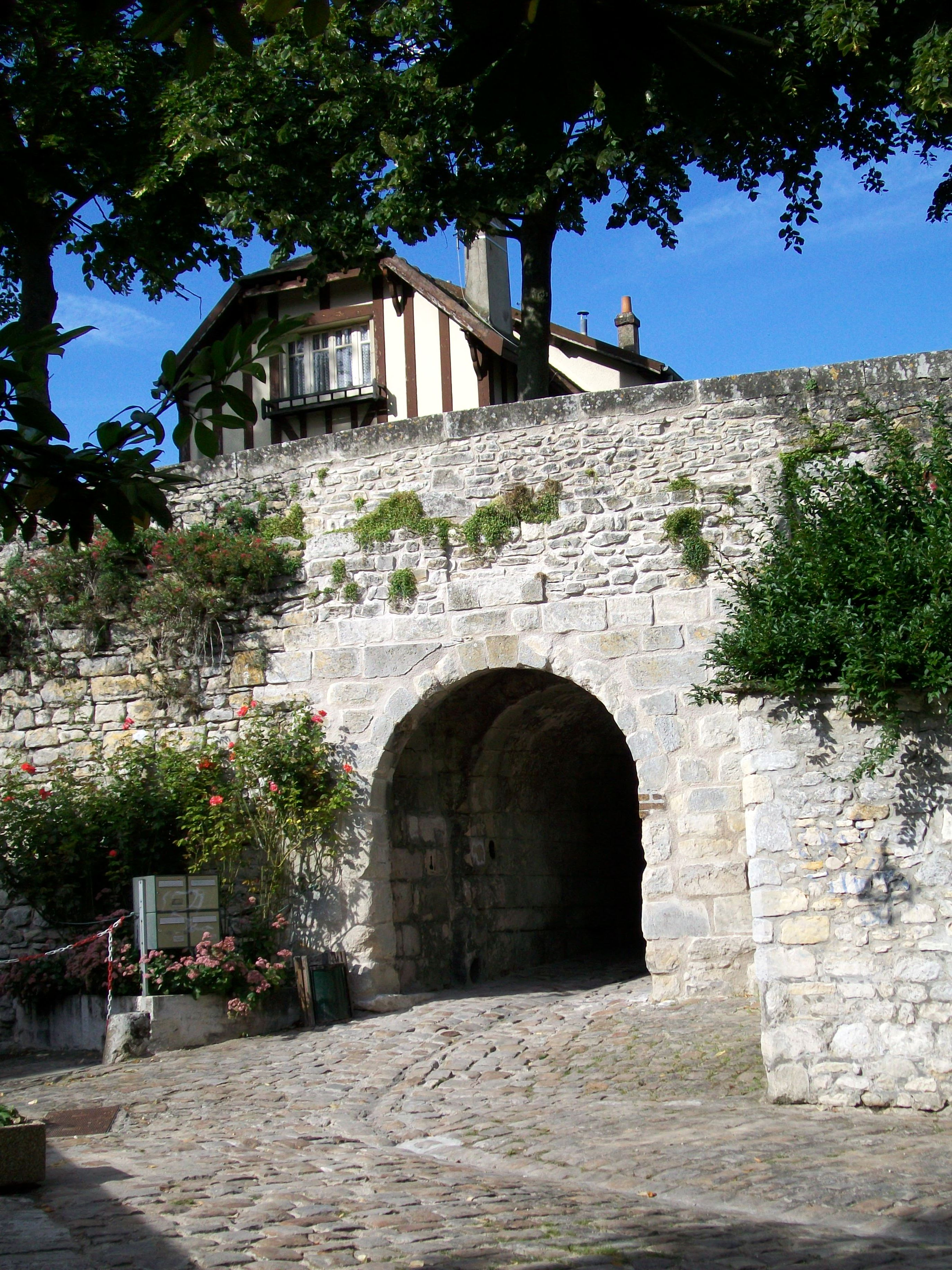
The Weaver's Postern Gate, Rue du Dos d'Âne, allowing access to the Nonette.

The Escalade rampart begins at the Place du 3^{e} houzards, (3rd Hussars Place), a name given to the area surrounding the monument to Franco-Moroccan brotherhood on Cours Boutteville, not far from the Square de Verdun (a public garden in front of the old train station). It's a public promenade that runs north–south for about 250m, as far as the Meaux gate, where it becomes the Bellevue rampart. The walkway is on the rampart and since the grounds to the east are all private property, one can see very little of the walls of the enclosure. The rampart was lowered by three meters, and the trench backfilled. Even from the Rue du moulin Saint-Étienne (Street of the Saint-Étinne Mill), parallel to the Belleville rampart to the east, the rampart isn't visible until the bastion at the Porte de Meaux. The name of the Rempart de l'Escalade comes from an episode in the history of Senlis that took place after the victory against the Catholic League, on May 17, 1589. The latter did not accept their defeat but instead sent men on July 4, 1590, to scale the ramparts by night with ladders, at a moment when Henri IV and his troops were engaged in several other theaters of conflict. The first invaders were nonetheless discovered by a guard, and, thinking that the city was already invaded, he gave the alarm. So many citizens of Senlis then came to the walls' defenses, that the invaders fled as soon as the sun rose.

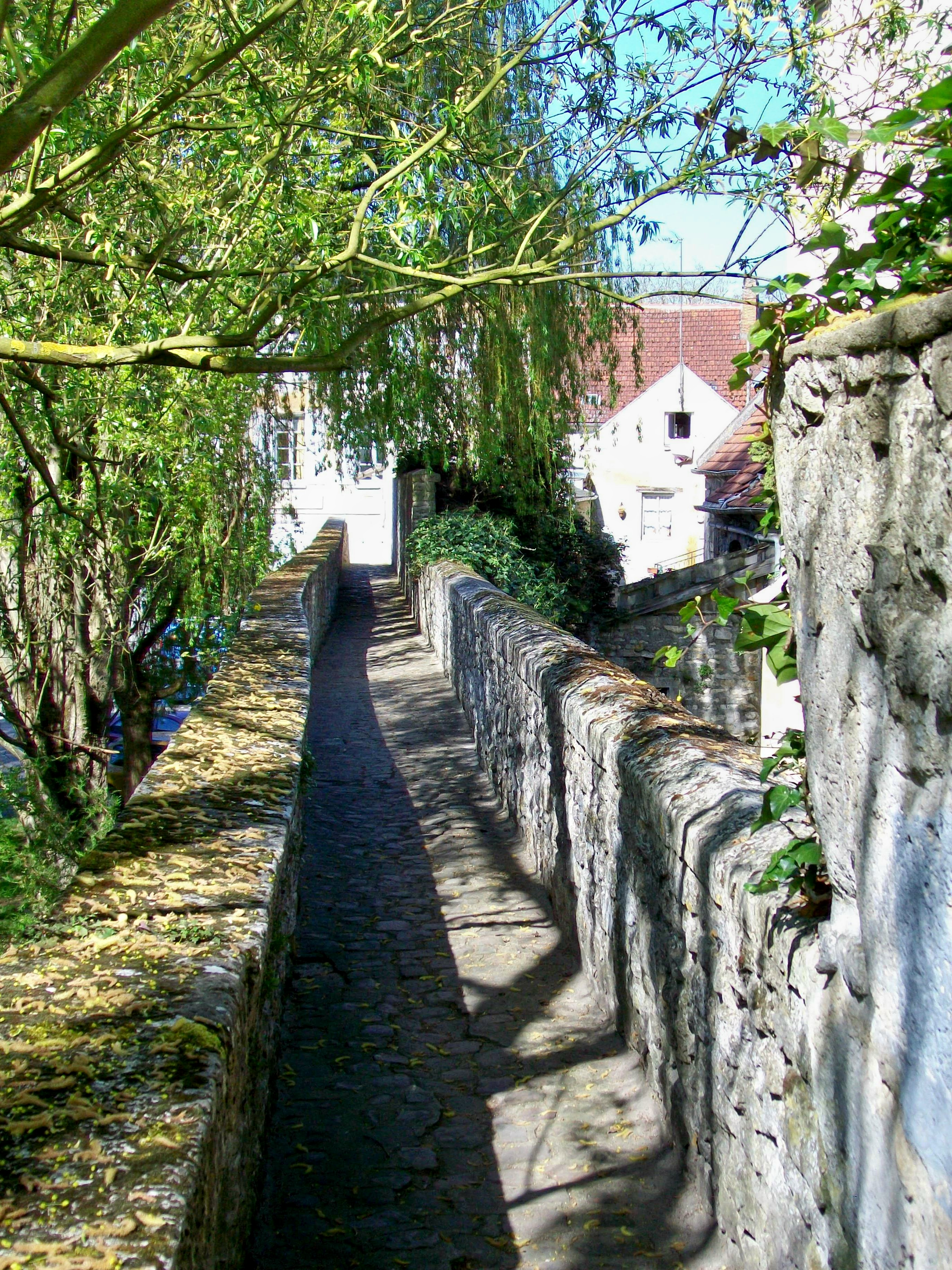
The Passage des Carmes between the old convent and the Nonette, on the medieval rampart.

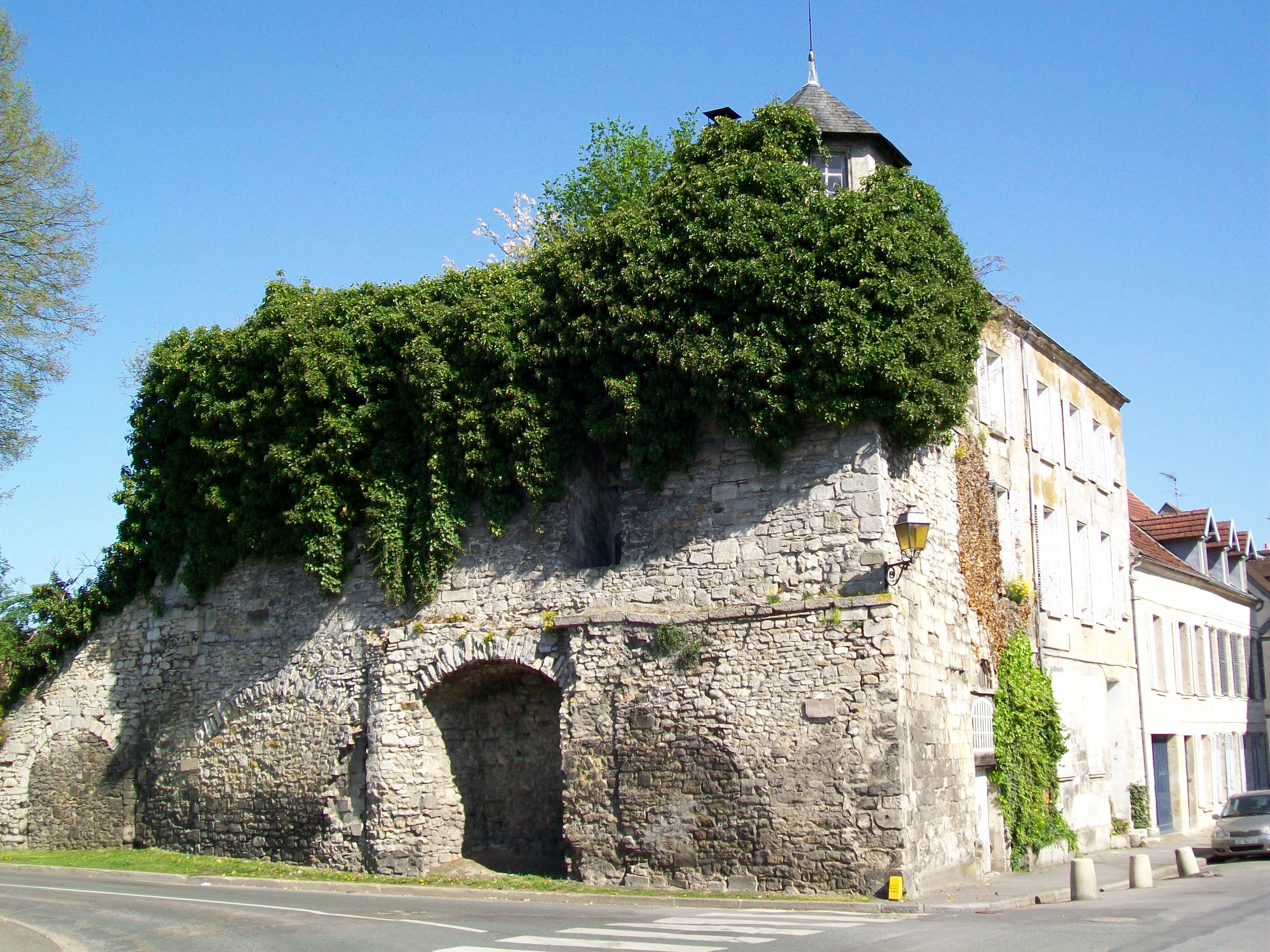
Vestiges of the platform of the Porte de Paris, at the corner of the old rue de Paris and the boulevard des Otages.

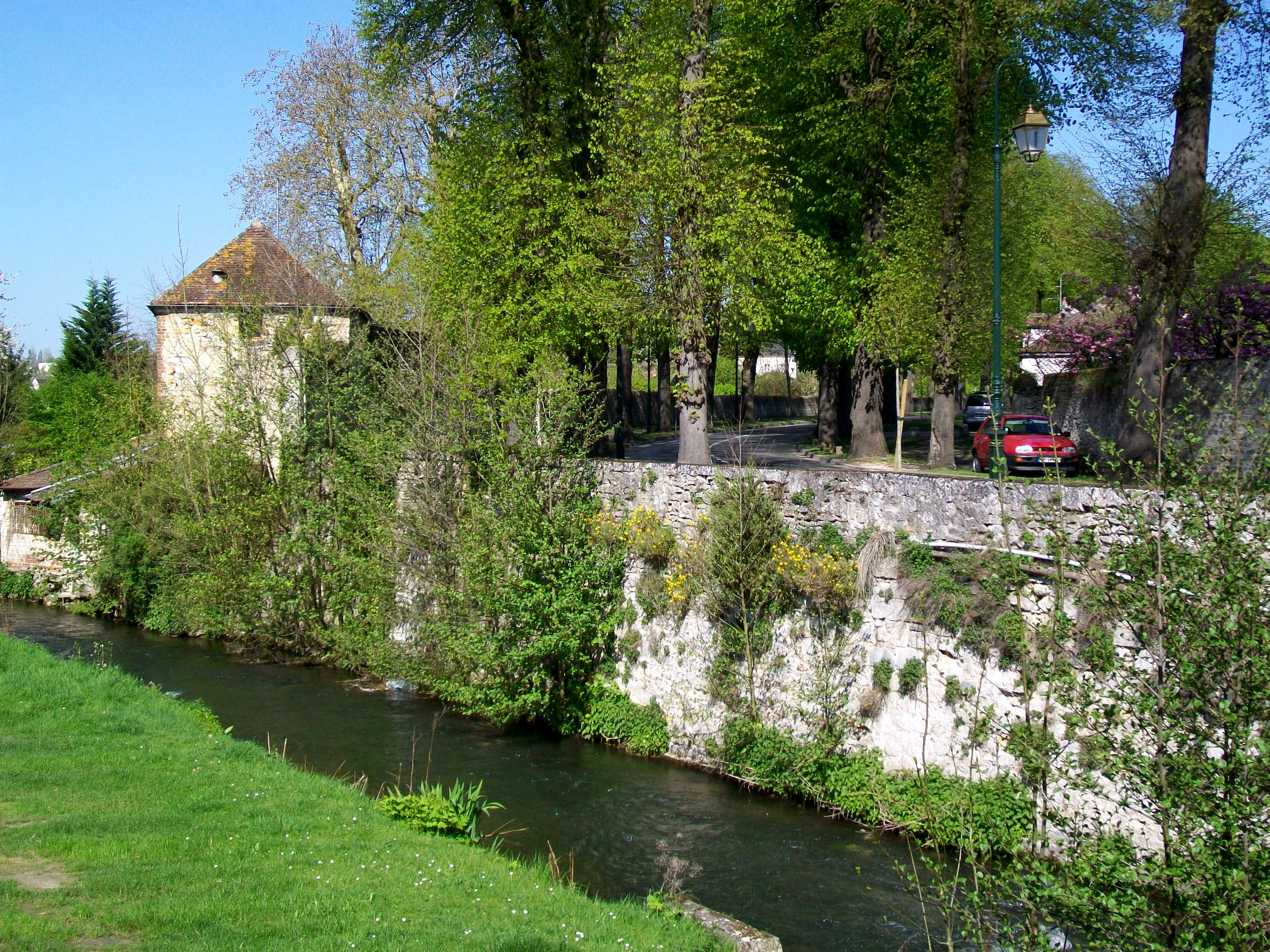
In the background the beginning of the rempart des Otages; in the foreground, the Nonette diverted before the porte de Paris.

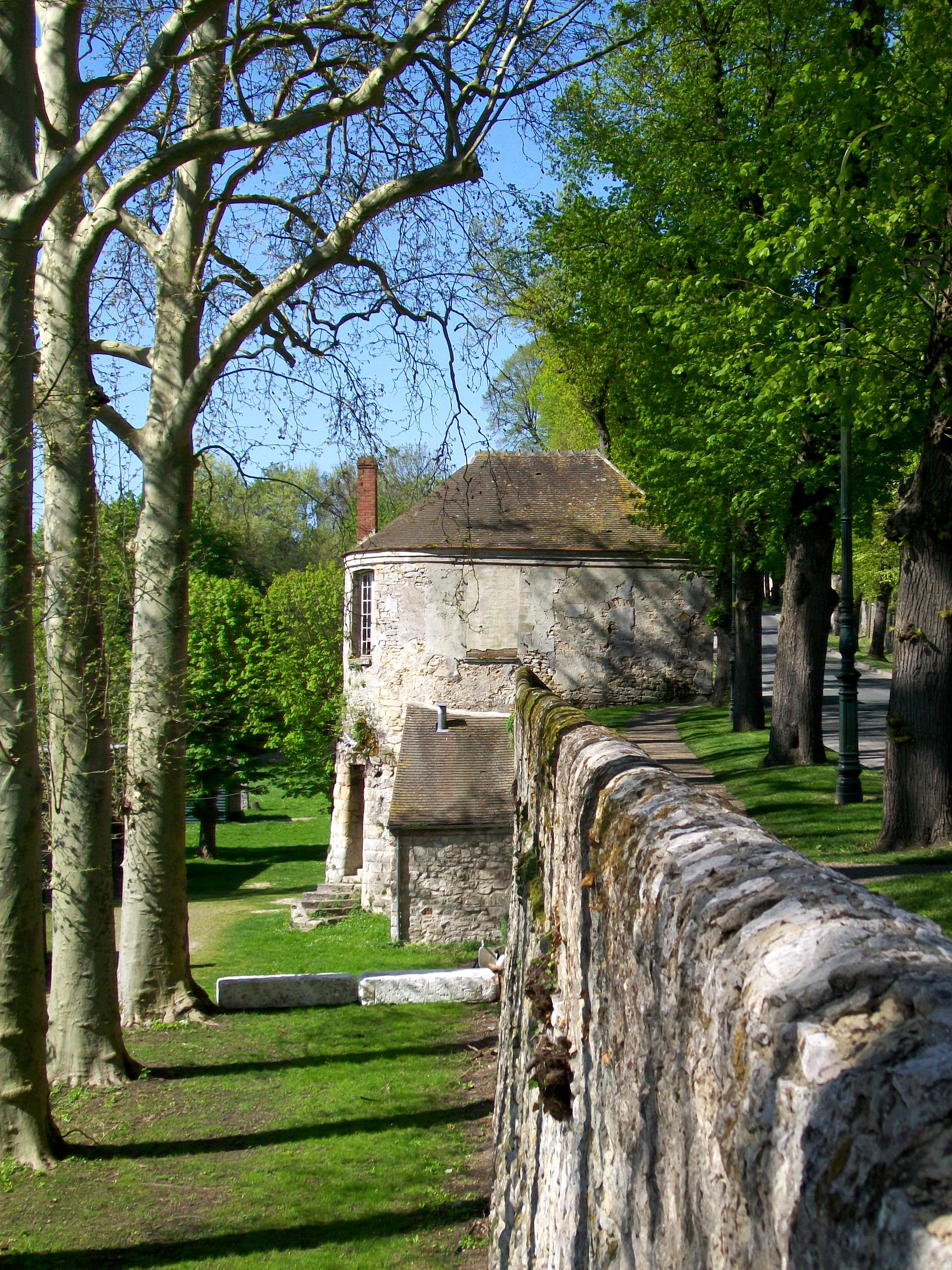
Tour du jeu d'arc, the last tower remaining on the rempart des Otages.

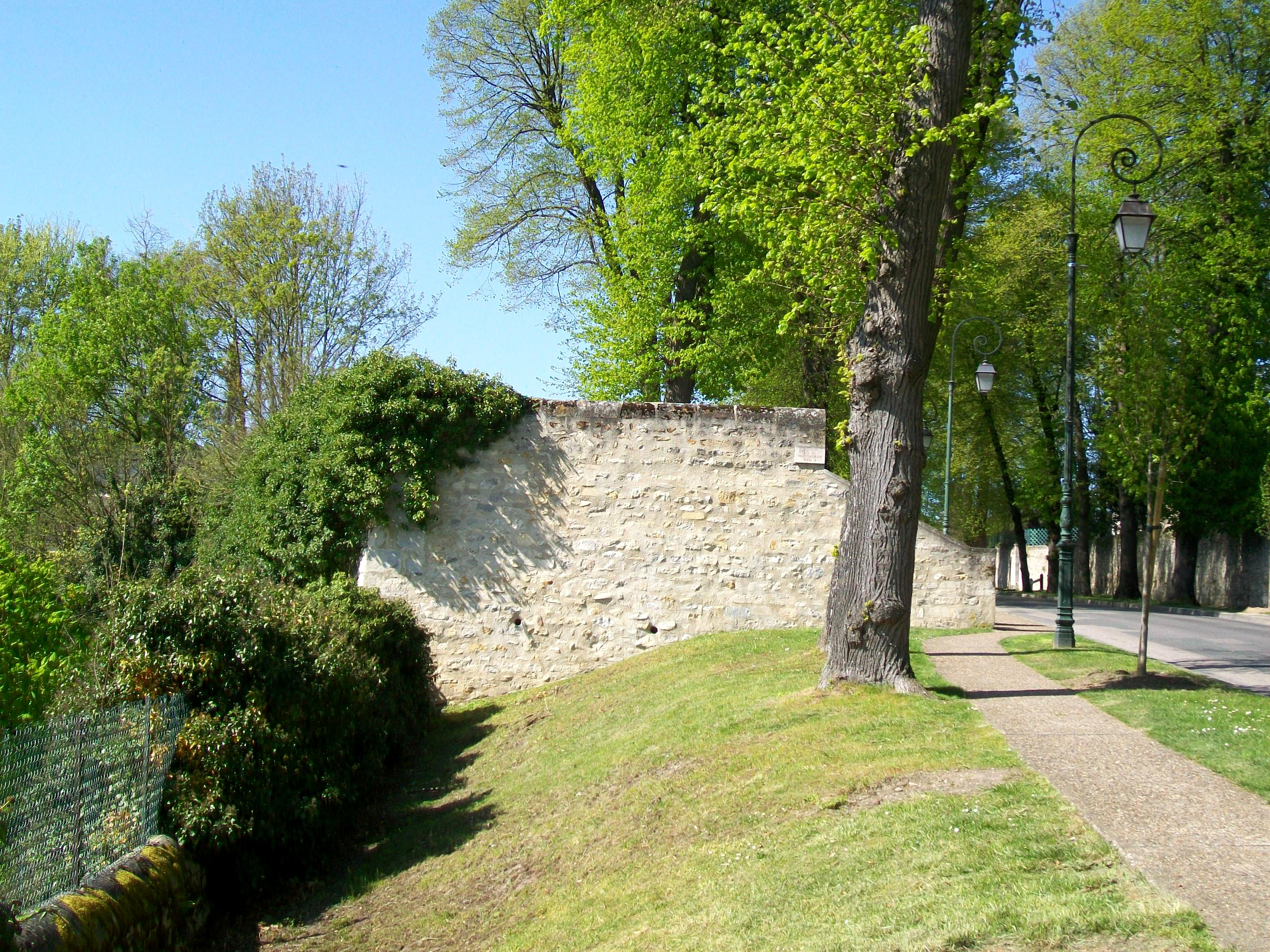
platforme of Montauban, at the north end of the rempart des Otages.

in The bastion of the Porte de Meaux, also known as the bastion Saint-Vincent, is perhaps the most imposing element that remains of the medieval enclosure; however it does date from the modern era. It was built in 1544 under Jean-François de La Rocque de Roberval, charged by François I with completing the city's defenses. In 1619, the archer's community received permission to establish a butt on this bastion, in return for an annual payment of four livres, ten sols tournois. The bastion can be seen from Rue du moulin Saint-Étienne, behind private gardens, especially when the trees have lost their leaves. It can also be seen from a different angle on the Rue de Meaux.

The rempart des Otages (Hostages' Rampart) corresponds to the boulevard des Otages (Boulevard of the Hostages), named for the hostages who were decapitated in the April 19, 1418 siege of Senlis. Boulevard des Otages goes from the site of the former porte de Paris, at the intersection of the Paris road and the old Paris road, to the western end of rue de la montagne Saint-Aignan (Mount St Aignan Street). From this point, incidentally the location of the plate-forme du Montauban (see below), the boulevard is named boulevard du Montauban. Le boulevard des Otages was built on the crown of the rampart and this is why the unprepared visitor might search in vain for the rampart. It was also built over the moat of the first medieval rampart The bridge over the Nonette leading to the Paris gate is the only place where it is possible to contemplate the rampart from outside: all the land below it is privately owned. The preserved section of the rempart is 250m long, measured from the boulevard. For this reason, nothing remains between the Porte de Paris and the elbow of the boulevard where it deviates towards the north-east. The wall overlooking the river can be considered part of the ramparts only to a point.

- Tour du jeu d'arc: last remaining tower from the medieval ramparts, laid out in the shape of a horseshoe, with the round end facing outward. The tower consists of a ground floor, which abuts the city wall, and an upper floor at the height of the sidewalk. The city of Senlis rents the building to the compagnie d'arc du Montauban, and has done so since 1730. The ground below with the archery butts is the fossé aux Ânes, for it stood before the porte aux Ânes (Gate of the Donkeys).
- The Montauban platform: this small platform, triangular at its base and pentagonal in its upper part, is the highest point of the rempart des Otages, and is at the same time its northern limit. The Boulevard du Montauban beyond still follows the line of the old defenses, but the wall is no longer there. The platform is accessible to pedestrians. It formed a defensive whole with the buttress of the Creil gate, which was on the other side of the boulevard. The interior contained an arched piece linked by a tunnel to the interior of the enclosure. The rest was simply filled with rubble. The origin of the name is uncertain but seems fairly definitely unrelated to the city of Montauban.
