= Senlis =

- Subprefecture and commune
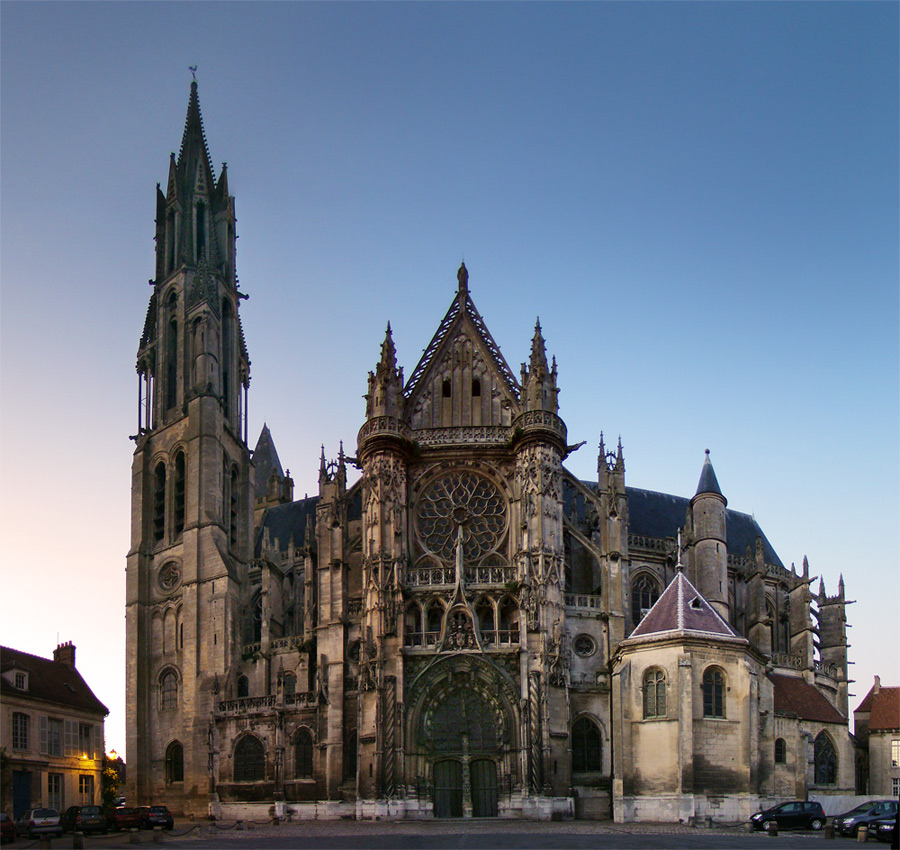
- Cathedral

- Flag Coat of arms
- Location of Senlis
- Location within France Location within Hauts-de-France
- Coordinates: 49°12′29″N 2°35′15″E
- Country: France
- Region: Hauts-de-France
- Department: Oise
- Arrondissement: Senlis
- Canton: Senlis
- Intercommunality: Senlis Sud Oise

Government
  - Mayor (2020–2026): Pascale Loiseleur
- Area^{1}: 24.05 km^{2} (9.29 sq mi)
- Elevation: 76 m (249 ft)
- Highest elevation: 140 m (460 ft)
- Lowest elevation: 47 m (154 ft)
- Population (2023): 15,157
  - Density: 630.2/km^{2} (1,632/sq mi)
- Time zone: UTC+01:00 (CET)
  - Summer (DST): UTC+02:00 (CEST)
- INSEE/Postal code: 60612 /60300
- ^{1} French Land Register data, which excludes lakes, ponds, glaciers > 1 km^{2} (0.386 sq mi or 247 acres) and river estuaries.

Senlis (French pronunciation: [sɑ̃lis]) is a commune in the northern French department of Oise, Hauts-de-France.

The monarchs of the early French dynasties lived in Senlis, attracted by the proximity of the Chantilly forest. It is known for its Gothic cathedral and other historical monuments. Its inhabitants are called "Senlisiens" and "Senlisiennes".

== Geography ==
Senlis is situated on the river Nonette, between the forests of Chantilly and d'Ermenonville in the South and d'Halatte on the North. It is located 40 kilometers to the north of Paris, 44 km from Beauvais and 79 km from Amiens. The highest point of the town (140m) lies at the heart of the forest Halatte and the lowest point is located on the banks of the Nonette, west of the city. Geologically, the area is occupied by a vast limestone plateau of the Lutetian covered mostly in silt.

== History ==
Senlis was known in early Roman imperial times as Augustomagus and later as Civitas Silvanectium ("City of the Silvanectes"). During the 3rd century, a seven-meter high defensive wall, about half of which still exists, was erected around the settlement in response to Frankish incursions. The wall remained in use into the 13th century. The town also featured a Roman amphitheatre, the remains of which are still visible, about 500 m west of the walled town. The amphitheatre seated as many as 10,000 people and was used for public meetings, theatre, gladiatorial combats, and animal hunts. The monarchs of the early French dynasties lived here, attracted by the proximity of the Chantilly Forest and its venison, and built a castle on the foundations of the Roman settlement. In 987, Archbishop Adalbero of Reims called together an assembly, and asked them to choose Hugh Capet as king of France. However, the monarchs of France soon abandoned the city, preferring Compiègne and Fontainebleau. New life was given to the city in the 12th century, and ramparts were built. The popularity of the city later fell, and it slipped into decline. Today it remains an attraction for tourists for its long history and its links to the French monarchy.

The town saw fighting in World War I, with the Germans occupying the town in early September 1914. The mayor, Eugène Odent was executed by the Germans along with six other civilian hostages: a tanner, a carter, a cafe waiter, a chauffeur, a baker's helper and a stonecutter. In addition, the train station and courthouse was burned down, along with other buildings. The town was later liberated that same year, by the French Army.

== Royal city ==
Senlis fell under the ownership of Hugh Capet in 981. He was elected king by his barons in 987 before being crowned at Noyon. Under the Capetian rule, Senlis became a royal city and remained so until the reign of Charles X (1824-1830). A castle was built during this period whose remains are still visible today. The city reached its apogee in the 12th and 13th centuries as trade in wool and leather increased, while vineyards began to grow. With an increasing population, the city expanded and needed new ramparts: a second chamber was erected under Phillip II that was larger and higher than the ramparts of the Gallo-Romans. A municipal charter was granted to the town in 1173 by King Louis VII. The bishop of Senlis and the Chancellor Guérin became close advisors to the King, strengthening Senlis' ties to the French royalty. In 1265, the Bailiwick of Senlis was created with a vast territory covering the Beauvais and the French Vexin. In 1319, the town, crippled by debt, passed into the control of royalty. Senlis was devastated by the Hundred Years' War, but managed to escape destruction despite being besieged by the Armagnacs. Senlis' economy suffered heavily and would have to wait until the 15th century for another boom, during which many buildings were built or restored. In 1493, King Charles VIII of France, son of Louis XI, signed the Treaty of Senlis with the Duke of Burgundy, Maximilian I of Austria.

== Population ==
Historical population
Year	Pop.	±% p.a.
1968	11,169	—
1975	13,639	+2.90%
1982	14,514	+0.89%
1990	14,439	−0.06%
1999	16,327	+1.37%
2007	16,310	−0.01%
2012	15,789	−0.65%
2017	14,277	−1.99%
2023	15,157	+1.00%
Source: INSEE

== Sights ==
- Senlis Cathedral is a Roman Catholic Gothic church and a French national monument. The Cathedral was the ancient seat of the Bishopric of Senlis, abolished by the Concordat of 1801, when its territory was passed to the Roman Catholic Diocese of Beauvais. The southern portal of the 16th century, the work of Martin Chambiges, marked the evolution of Gothic art. The cathedral was built between 1153 and 1519; its 256-foot-tall (78 m) spire dates from the 13th century and is visible across the plain of Valois. Its transepts were rebuilt between 1530 and 1556 after being destroyed by a fire, while the side portals and shallow east chapels date from about the same period.
- The Ancient Royal Castle- priory Saint Maurice. The site has been occupied since the Roman era. In the course of the 4th century, the site was visited by the Carolingian kings. The current castle dates to the 12th century and was built under Louis VII of France.
- Hôtel de Ville Senlis has a plaque attached to honor the loyalty of Henry IV of France.
- The former St. Vincent Abbey was founded in 1065 by Queen Anne of Kiev and entrusted to the canons regular of the Abbey of St Genevieve in Paris, known as Génovéfains. The complex was transformed into a boys' boarding school by the Marist Fathers in the 19th century.
- The Museum of Art and Archeology contains notably rings found in a Gallo-Roman temple in the forest of Halatte.
- The Museum of the Hunts
- The Museum of the Spahis

== Culture ==
In 1972, Senlis was made into a pedestrian town for a weekend in September, and this became a regular event, allowing the public to discover the gardens and hôtels particuliers hidden behind gateways. The last gathering took place in 2007. The Garden Lounge takes place around April, and there is a Christmas march around the Church of Saint Peter.

The town was briefly captured by the Germans at the beginning of World War I. Several citizens were executed by firing squad in early September, including the mayor, Eugène Odent, who was charged with orchestrating “terrorist” civilian resistance – shuttering buildings for the convenience of snipers, failing to demand orderly submission from his neighbours and generally inconveniencing German troops. In 1931 the main street of Senlis was named after Odent.

In A Writer at War 14-18 Édouard Coeurdevey describes the German destruction that he witnesses when visiting Senlis on 6 June 1915. On 8 June he wrote 'Senlis bonde d'Annamites'.

The historic look of Senlis, with its ancient cobbled alleys and its proximity to Paris, made it a major destination for cinema. Among the films shot in Senlis:

- Coeurs du monde (1918) by D. W. Griffith, with Lillian Gish
- Ces dames aux chapeaux verts (1929) by André Berthomieu
- Le Dialogue des carmélites (1960) with Jeanne Moreau
- Cartouche (1961) by Philippe de Broca, with Jean-Paul Belmondo and Claudia Cardinale
- Angelique and the King (1965) with Michèle Mercier and Jean Rochefort
- Le Roi de Coeur (1966) by Philippe de Broca
- Peau d'âne (1970) with Catherine Deneuve, Jean Marais and Jacques Perrin
- Raphaël ou le Débauché (1971) by Michel Deville
- Les Stances à Sophie (1971) by Moshé Mizrahi
- Les malheurs d'Alfred (1972) by Pierre Richard
- R.A.S (Nothing to Report) (1973) by Yves Boisset
- L'aile ou la cuisse (1976) with Louis de Funès and Coluche
- L'Avare (1980) with Louis de Funès and Michel Galabru
- La Nuit de Varennes (1982) by Ettore Scola, with Jean-Louis Barrault, Marcello Mastroianni and Hanna Schygulla
- Papy Fait de la Résistance (1983) with Christian Clavier and Michel Blanc
- La Petite Voleuse (1988) by Claude Miller, with Charlotte Gainsbourg
- La Reine Margot (1994) with Isabelle Adjani and Daniel Auteuil
- Le Comte de Montécristo (1997) with Gérard Depardieu
- Arsène Lupin (2004) by Jean-Paul Salomé, with Kristin Scott Thomas
- Séraphine (2008) by Martin Provost with Yolande Moreau
- L'autre Dumas (2010) with Gérard Depardieu and Benoît Poelvoorde
- Crainquebille (2010) television movie
- Soeur-Thérèse.com (2011) TV series

== Personalities ==
- Antoine Baumé, pharmacist
- Grégoire Boissenot, French composer, author and singer
- Louis Bromfield, American author
- Jean-Christophe Canter, French politician, former mayor of Senlis
- Bernard Cazeneuve, politician and Prime Minister
- Pierre Chastellain, Jesuit
- Bruno Cohen, MOF (meilleur ouvrier de France) photographer
- Thomas Couture, history painter and teacher
- Georges Cziffra, Hungarian pianist
- David De Freitas, footballer
- Gérard de Nerval, 19th-century writer
- Jean Baptiste Lefebvre de Villebrune, physician, philologist and translator
- Jean Eudes Demaret, cyclist
- Bill Deraime, singer
- Armand Durantin, French playwright and novelist
- Kevin Gameiro, French footballer
- Evan Giltaire, racing driver
- Céline Goberville, shooter
- Benjamin Gueret, businessman
- Claire Keim, actress and singer
- Séraphine Louis, French naïve painter
- William Malherbe, Post Impressionist painter
- Anne Marivin, actress
- Sébastien Minard, cyclist
- Jules Moigniez, animalier sculptor
- Pierre Montazel, cinematographer
- Anne Pérard, 18th-century history writer
- Karim Souchu, basketball player
- Sting, Rock musician and singer
- Jérôme Thion, rugby union footballer
- Elvis Vermeulen, rugby union footballer

== International relations ==
Senlis is twinned with:

- Langenfeld, Germany
- Montale, Italy
- Pechersk (Kyiv), Ukraine

== See also ==
- Communes of the Oise department
- Ramparts of Senlis
