= Charleville, Marne =

Charleville
- Commune
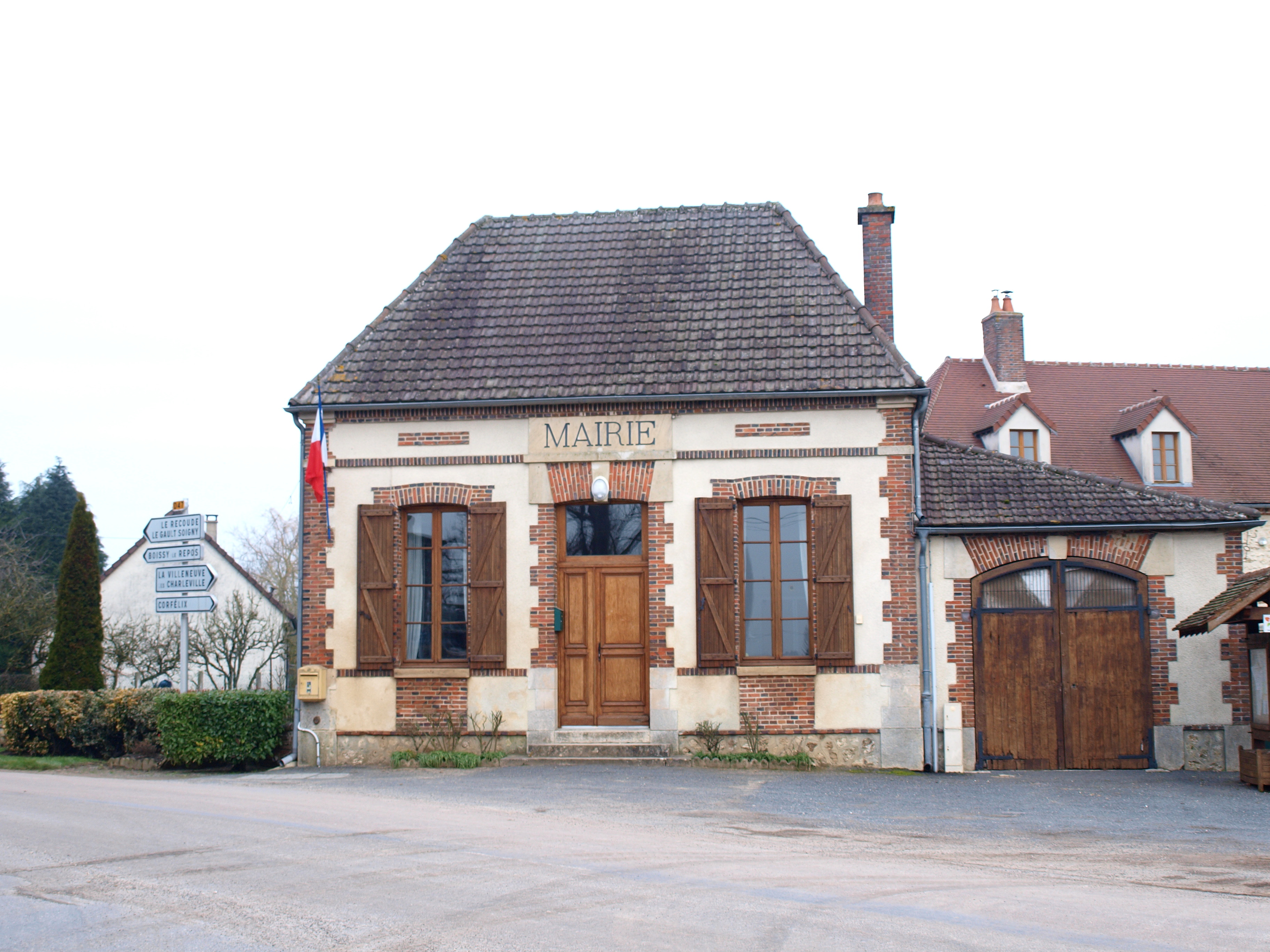
- The town hall in Charleville
- Location of Charleville
- Location within France Location within Grand Est
- Coordinates: 48°49′00″N 3°40′00″E
- Country: France
- Region: Grand Est
- Department: Marne
- Arrondissement: Épernay
- Canton: Sézanne-Brie et Champagne
- Intercommunality: CC Brie Champenoise

Government
  - Mayor (2020–2026): Colette Pasquet
- Area^{1}: 17.67 km^{2} (6.82 sq mi)
- Population (2023): 262
  - Density: 14.8/km^{2} (38.4/sq mi)
- Time zone: UTC+01:00 (CET)
  - Summer (DST): UTC+02:00 (CEST)
- INSEE/Postal code: 51129 /51120
- ^{1} French Land Register data, which excludes lakes, ponds, glaciers > 1 km^{2} (0.386 sq mi or 247 acres) and river estuaries.

Charleville (French pronunciation: [ʃaʁləvil]) is a commune in the Marne department in north-eastern France.

== Personalities ==
Anne Pérard, (1743–1829), history writer

== See also ==
- Communes of the Marne department
