= Anne Pérard =

History writer

- Born: 12 December 1743; Charleville, France
- Died: 1829 (aged 85–86); Senlis, France
- Other name: Mlle de Chateauregnault
- Parents: Etienne Pérard (father); Jeanne Pierdhouy (mother)

Anne Pérard (1743–1829) was a history writer who lived in France. She published her best-known work in 1783 under the pseudonym of Mademoiselle de Chateauregnault.

== Biography ==
Anne Pérard was born on 12 December 1743 in Charleville, France to Etienne Pérard, a lawyer in Parliament, and Jeanne Pierdhouy.

Anne Pérard's book, A Historical Praise of Anne de Montmorency (1783) was published with the author listed under the pen name Mlle. de Chateauregnault, and it was praised by the Academy of La Rochelle. The book presented a quick picture of events that took place from the reign of King Charles VIII to the battle of St. Denis. In a published review, Abbot Sabatier de Castres, a friend of the author, said of the book, "this is a piece of our best written story that is known."

Pérard was included in the Historical Dictionary, literary and bibliographic of Fortunée Lighter (1804), which mentioned 526 women of talent who lived between the sixth century and the start of the 19th century.

She was recognized as one of the rare female literary historians of her century in France. Her contemporaries included Stéphanie Félicité, comtesse de Genlis (1746–1830) as well as the Benedictine nun and mystic Marie-Jacqueline Bouette de Blémur and the prioress Françoise-Madeleine de Chaugy, who were both well regarded as writers and chroniclers of French history.

According to Worldcat.org, Pérard's work appears in 11 publications in French and English.

After retiring to Senlis in northern France, Pérard died in 1829 at age 85.
