= Jean Baptiste Lefebvre de Villebrune =

French philologist, physician and translator

Jean Baptiste Lefebvre de Villebrune (1732 in Senlis, Oise – 7 October 1809, in Angoulême) was a French philologist, physician and translator.

== Selected works ==
- Dictionnaire des particules angloises, précédé d'une grammaire raisonnée, ouvrage dans lequel toutes difficultés de langage sont aplanies, et où on trouvera tous les moyens de l'entendre et de l'écrire en peu de temps, le tout rapporté à l'usage (1774)
- Le Bouquet royal, impromptu en prose et en vaudevilles, arrangé de manière à pouvoir être joué à chaque fête royale, à l'aide des variantes, représenté pour la première fois sur les théâtres d'Orléans, Moulins et autres villes, les 1er. janvier 1815 et jours suivants (1815)
- Translation from English into French of William Hamilton's work Détails historiques des tremblemens de terre arrivés en Italie, depuis le 5 février jusqu'en mai 1783, par M. le chevalier Hamilton (1783)
- Translation from English into French of Michael Underwood's work Traité sur les ulcères des jambes, précédé de remarques en forme d'introduction sur le procédé de l'ulcération et l'origine du pus louable; suivi d'une méthode heureuse de traiter certaines tumeurs scrophuleuses, les ulcères des mamelons, les crevasses du sein et les abcès laiteux, par M. Michel Underwood. On y a joint la méthode de feu M. Else, de traiter les ulcères des jambes (1785)
- Translation from English into French of physician William (Guillaume) Grant's work, Recherches sur les fièvres, selon qu'elles dépendent des variations des saisons, & telles qu'on les a observées à Londres, ces vingt dernières années-ci (3 volumes, 1783–85)
- Translation from Italian into French of Riguccio Galluzzi's work Histoire du grand duché de Toscane sous le gouvernement des Médicis (9 volumes, 1782–84)
