= Senlis Cathedral =

Roman Catholic church and former cathedral in France

Senlis Cathedral Notre-Dame de Senlis
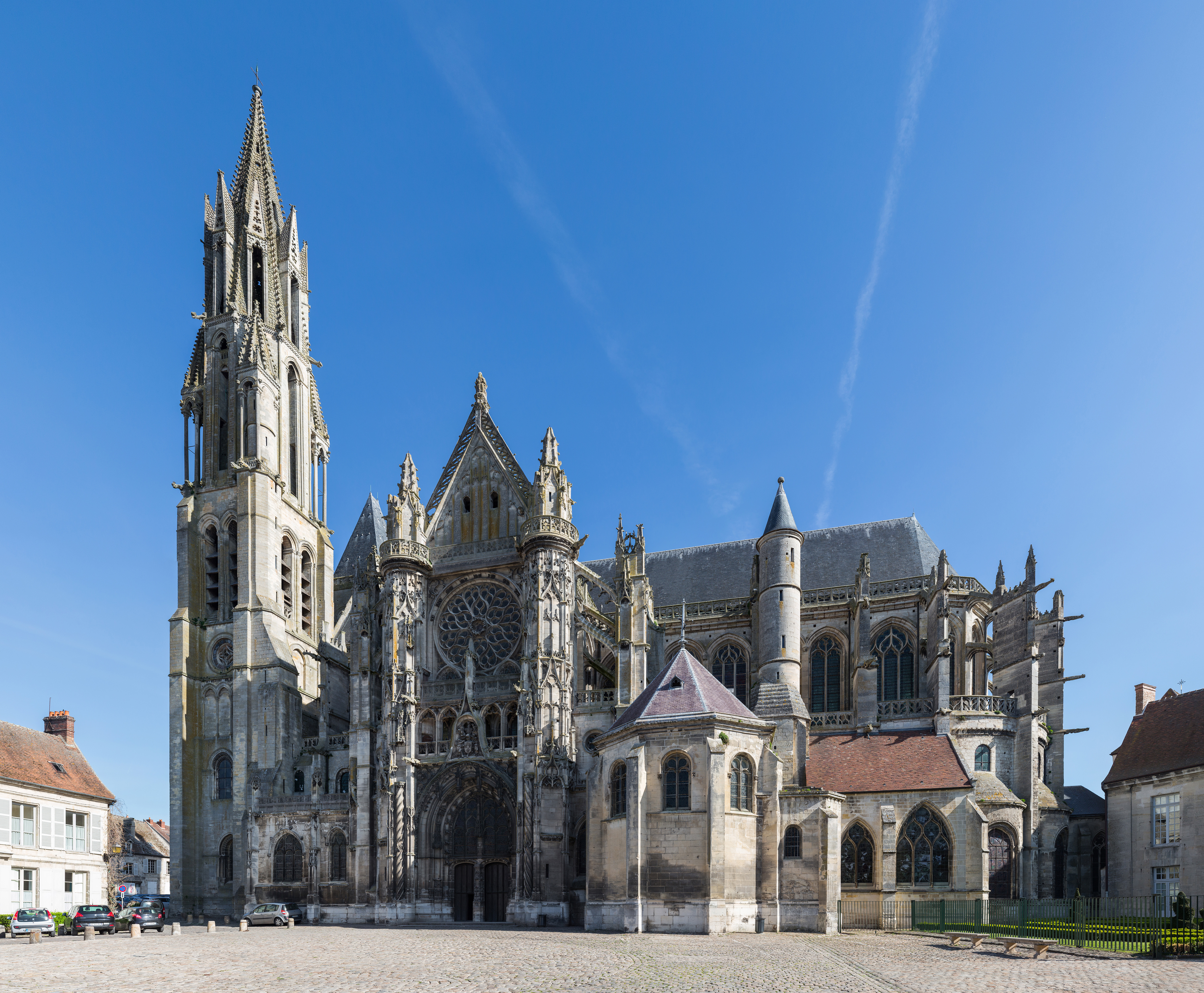
- The exterior

Religion
- Affiliation: Roman Catholic
- Province: Diocese of Beauvais
- Region: Hauts-de-France
- Ecclesiastical or organisational status: Parish church
- Status: Active

Location
- Location: Senlis, France
- Interactive map of Senlis Cathedral; Notre-Dame de Senlis
- Coordinates: 49°12′24.5″N 2°35′9.5″E

Architecture
- Type: Church
- Style: Early Gothic architecture
- Groundbreaking: 1153
- Completed: 1191

Specifications
- Length: 75 m (246 ft)
- Width: 30 m (98 ft)
- Width (nave): 9.20m
- Height (max): 26.50m
- Spire height: 40m

Website
- www.paroissesaintrieul.org

Senlis Cathedral (French: Cathédrale Notre-Dame de Senlis) is a Roman Catholic church and former cathedral in Senlis, Oise, France. It was formerly the seat of the Bishopric of Senlis, abolished under the Concordat of 1801, when its territory was passed to the Diocese of Beauvais. Notre-Dame Cathedral was built, for the most part, during the third quarter of the 12th century, when the royal city of Senlis was experiencing a true "golden age". It was profoundly renovated in the 13th and 16th centuries. With its portal of the crowning of the Virgin (12th century), its monumental 78 meter south tower (13th century) and transept façades all masterpieces of the high and late Gothic, Notre Dame de Senlis takes its place among the most noticeable cathedrals in France and was included in the first list of historical monuments in 1840.

== History ==
The origins of the church date to the end of the 4th or the beginning of the 5th century, when three churches and a baptistery stood on the site of the present-day site. The cathedral being the seat of a bishop's authority, the presence of a first bishop led to its construction.

Construction of the current church started around 1151 under Bishop Pierre following the union of the two churches and the demolition of the baptistery in 1153. The financing of the construction was essentially from the work of the bishops who were financially less well off than the other bishops of the region. Construction began simultaneously at both the east and west ends of the building. In 1160, the central portal of the western façade with the earliest known sculptural depiction of the Virgin's Coronation was completed, and the choir and its western façade by 1167. Despite being unfinished, the church was consecrated on 16 June 1191 by the Archbishop of Reims Guillaume of the White Hands. Towards the end of the 14th century, the chapter house was built, and around 1465 there was added the Bailli chapel, founded by Gilles de Rouvroy, known as Saint-Simon, bailiff of Senlis and ancestor of the Duke of Saint-Simon. He was buried there in 1477, as well as some of his descendants.

In 1504, a fire, caused by lightning, destroyed the framework and caused the vaults to collapse, with the exception of the first bay. Thanks to the donations of the kings Louis XII and Francis I, the upper parts of the cathedral were reconstructed. Modifications included raising the vaults by 6 metres, doubling of the aisles, and reconstruction of the side facades in a flamboyant Gothic decoration. The restoration began in 1506 and lasted until 1515.

In 1520, the façade of the southern transept was added. Its magnificent portal was built by Martin Chambiges and continued by his son Pierre; it dates from 1538 and the north portal is from 1560. The eastern chapels date from the same time.

In 1671 the chapel of the Sacred Heart was constructed on the ancient Gallo-Roman wall.

In 1777 the choir received a neo-classical decoration which can still be seen today.

The French Revolution destroyed the furniture and destroyed the heads of statues and columns of the western portal, which were replaced in the middle of the 19th century.

The cathedral is classified as an historic monument on the first list of 1840; the old library was classified in 1929.

In 1986, the restoration of the interior was completed, and in 1993 the restoration of the spire was completed.

== The interior ==
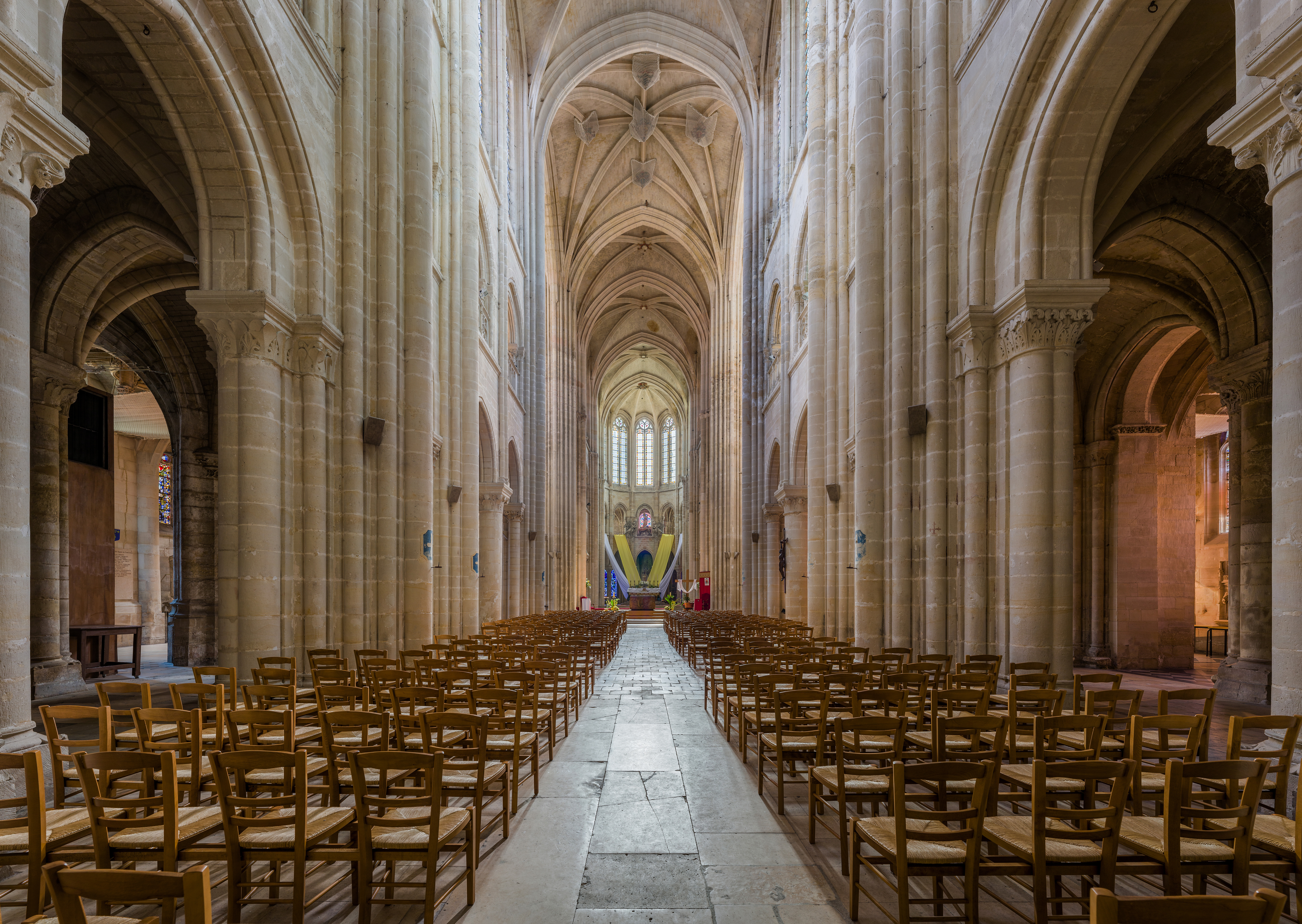
The nave

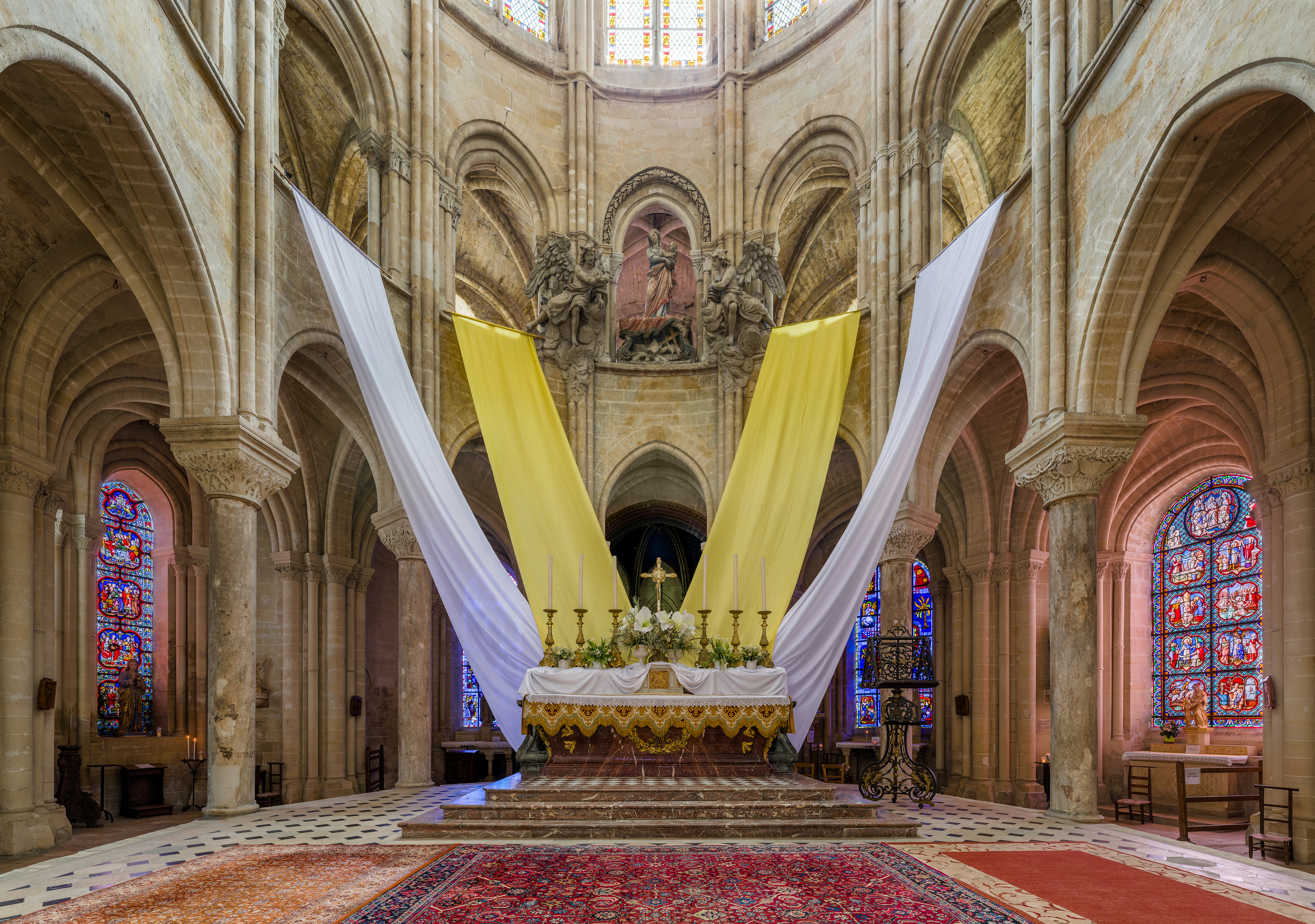
The sanctuary

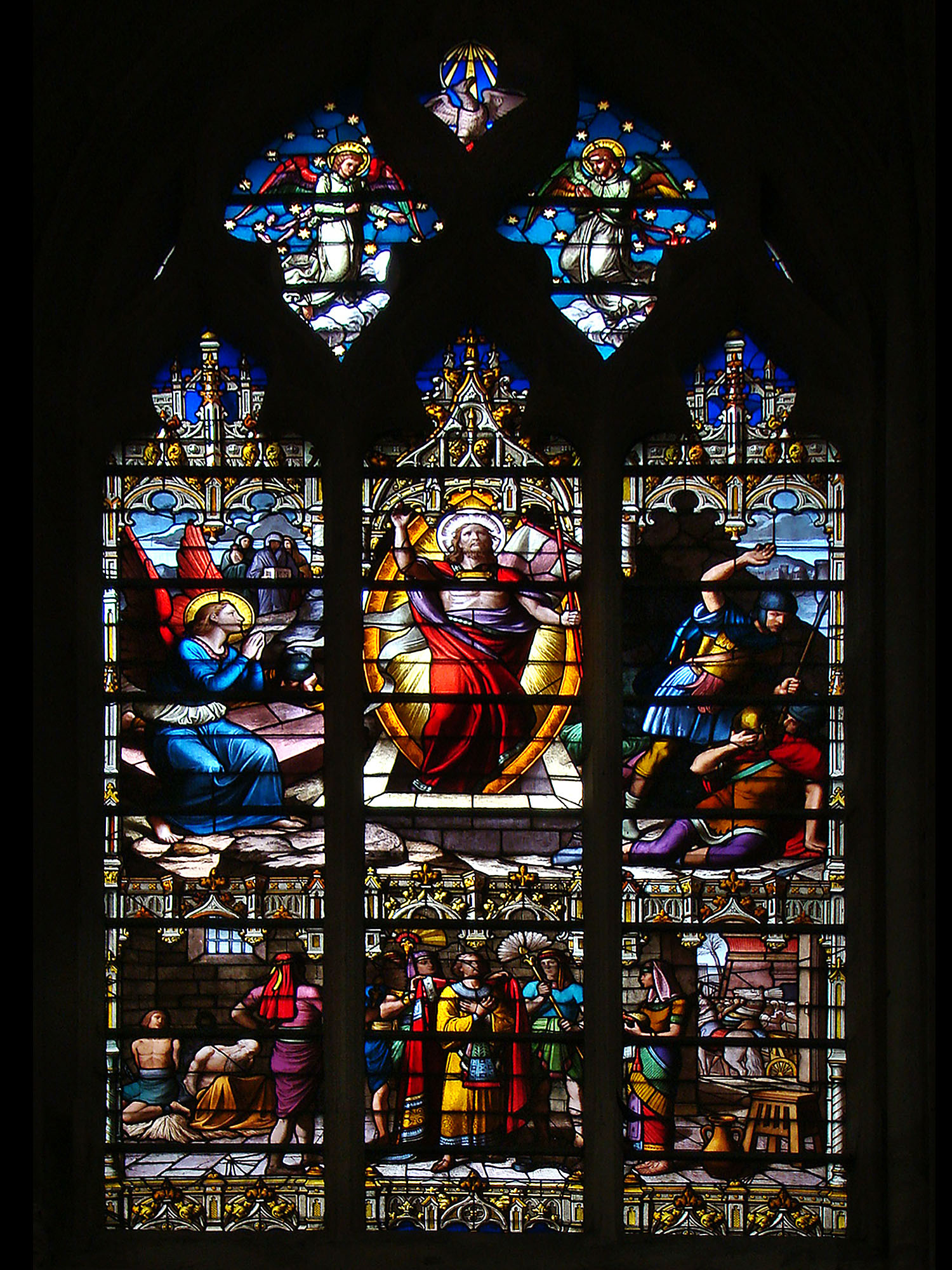
Stained-glass window

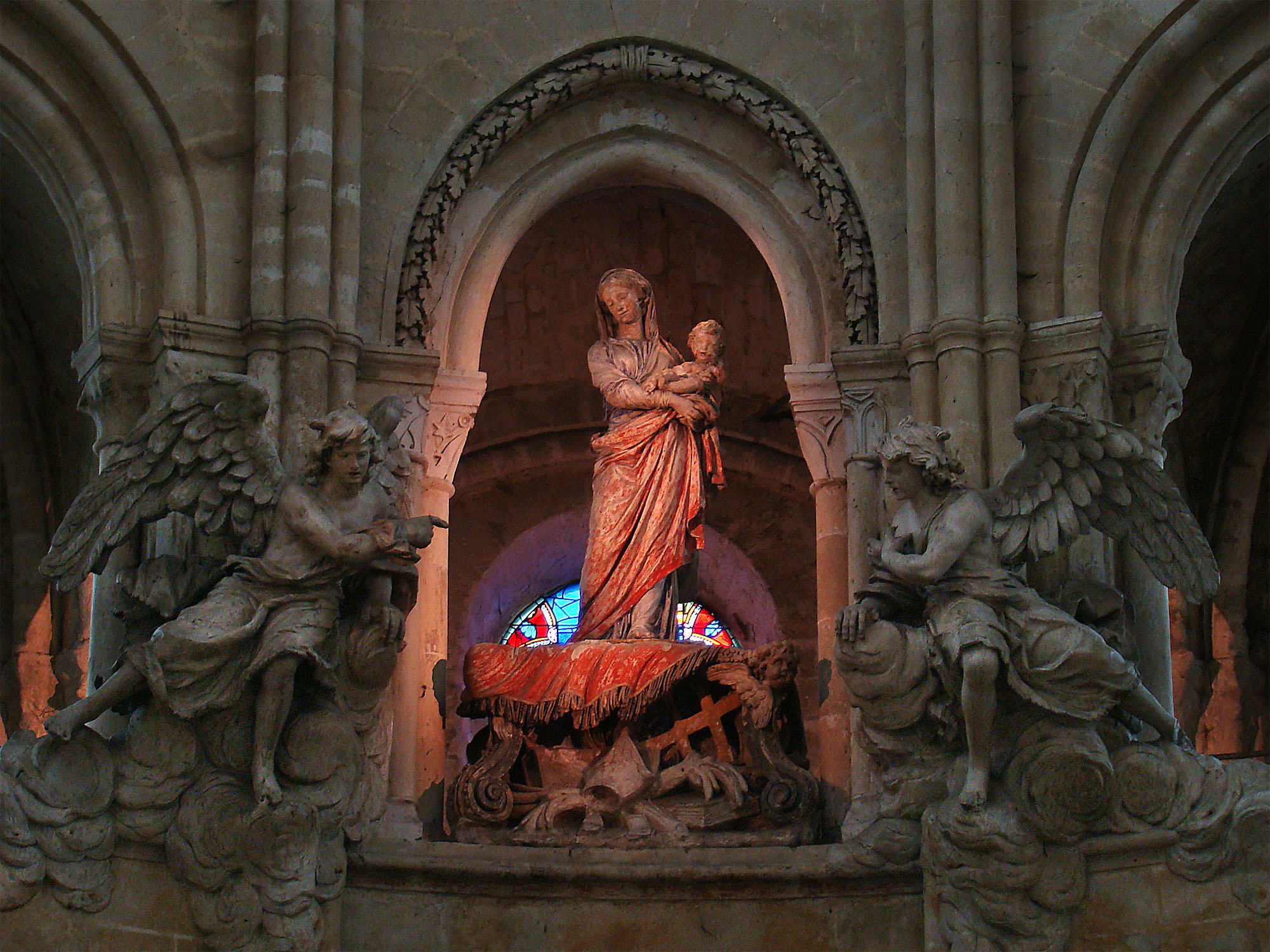
In the apse

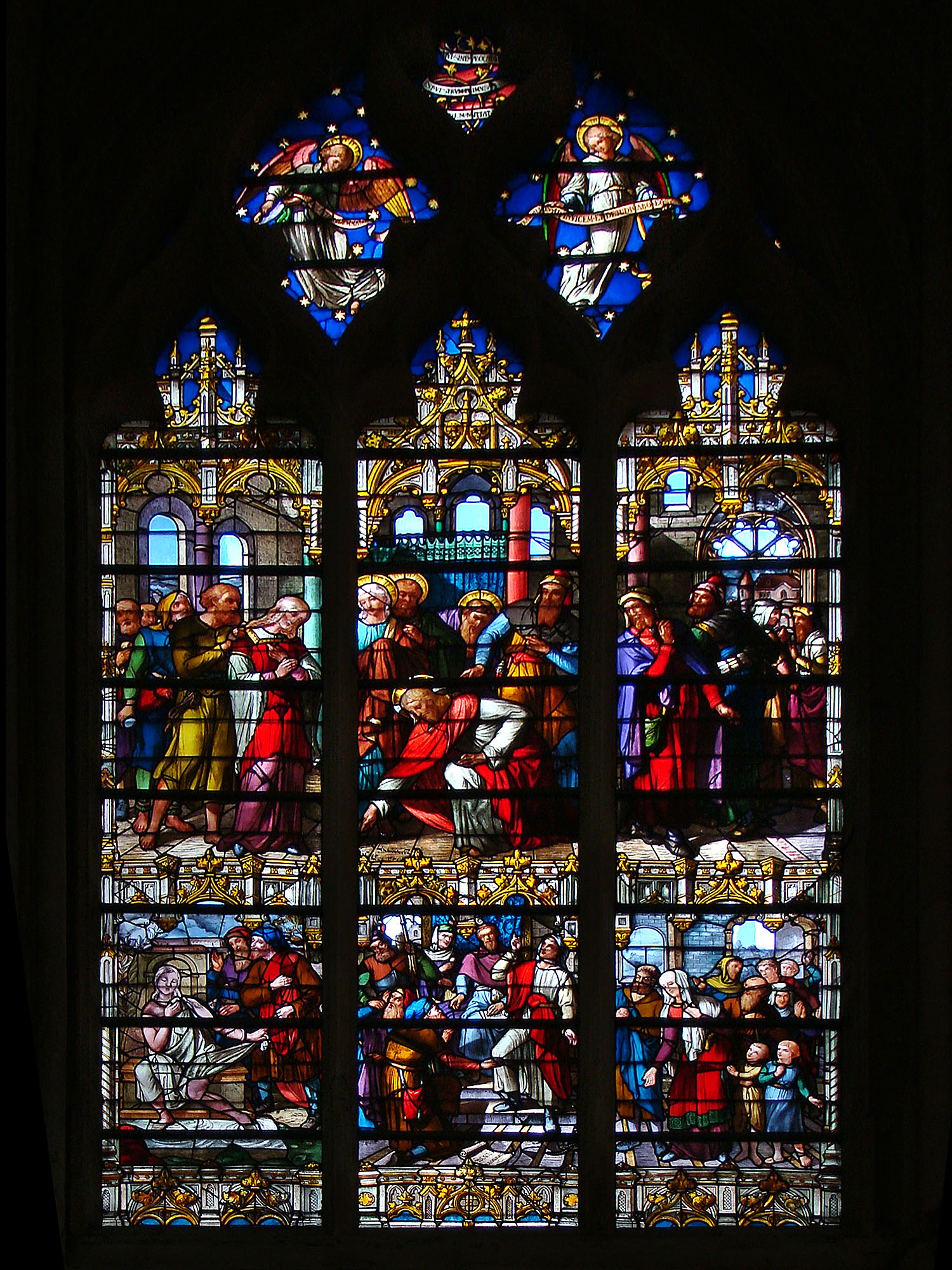
Stained-glass window

== Sources ==
- Catholic Hierarchy: Diocese of Senlis
