= Golden voice =

Golden voice may refer to:

- Golden Voice Oy, a Finnish dubbing company
- The Golden Voice (album), a 1970 album by Nora Aunor
- The Golden Voice (2006 film), an American short film about Ros Serey Sothea (see below)
- The Golden Voice (2025 film), an American film starring Nick Nolte

== People with the nickname ==
- Jane Cain (1909–1996), original voice of the UK speaking clock, "Girl with the Golden Voice"
- Fatu Gayflor (born 1966), Liberian singer, "the golden voice of Liberia"
- Ros Serey Sothea (c. 1948–c. 1977), Cambodian singer
- Ted Williams (born 1957), American voice-over artist and radio personality
- Zhou Xuan (1920–1957), Chinese singer and actress

== See also ==
- John Chrysostom (c. 347–407), Christian saint whose epithet means "golden mouth"
- Articles containing "golden voice"
