= Rittenhouse Square =

Public park in Philadelphia, US

- U.S. National Register of Historic Places
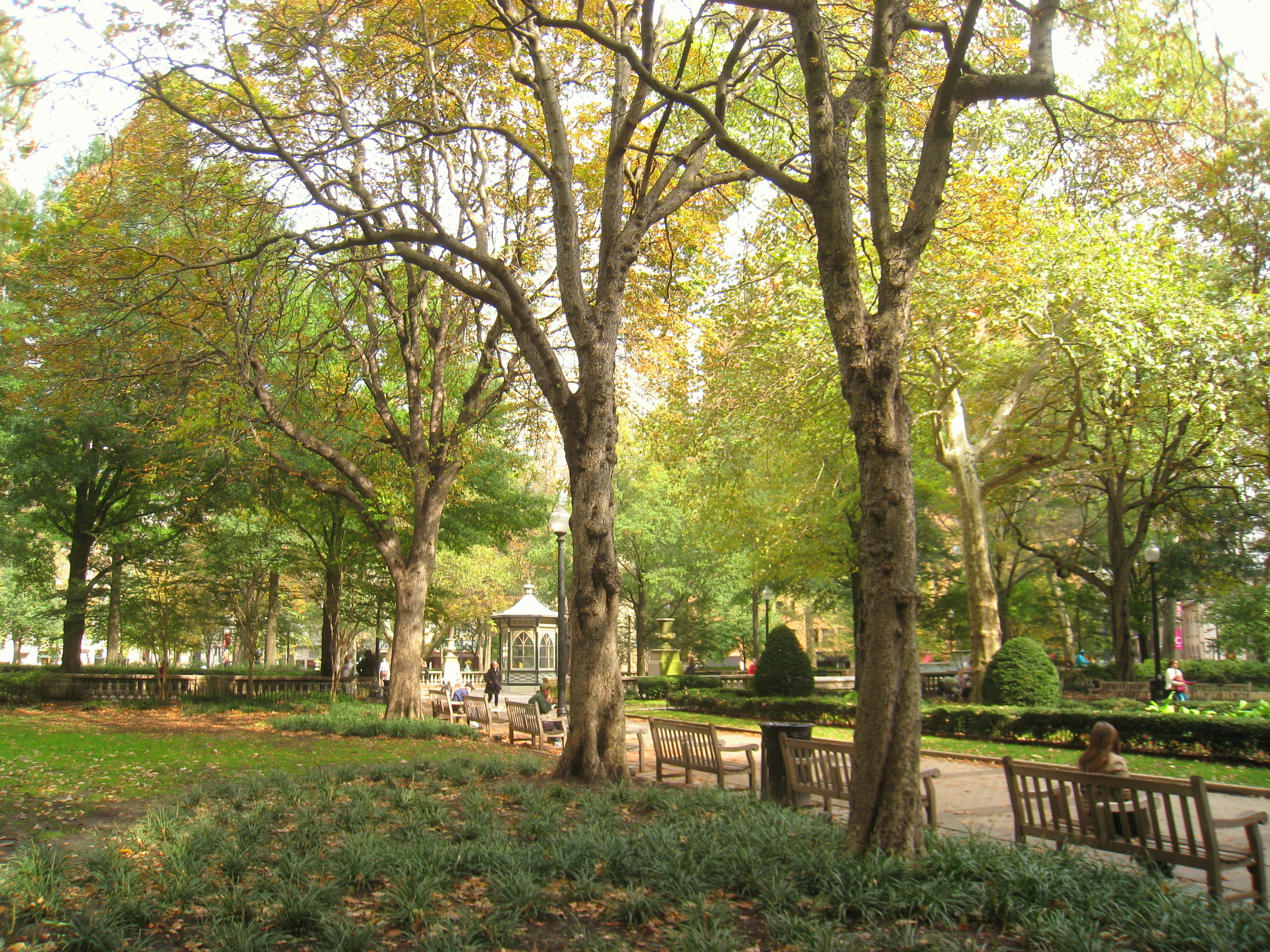
- Rittenhouse Square in October 2010

- Location within Philadelphia Location within Pennsylvania Location within the United States
- Location: Philadelphia, Pennsylvania, U.S.
- Coordinates: 39.9495°N 75.1719°W
- Built: 1683
- Architects: Thomas Holme and Paul Philippe Cret
- MPS: Four Public Squares of Philadelphia TR
- NRHP reference No.: 81000557
- Added to NRHP: September 14, 1981

Rittenhouse Square is a public park in Center City Philadelphia, Pennsylvania that is the center of the eponymous Rittenhouse neighborhood. The square is one of the five original open-space parks planned by William Penn and his surveyor Thomas Holme during the late 17th century. Together with Fitler Square, the Rittenhouse neighborhood and the square comprise the Rittenhouse–Fitler Historic District.

Rittenhouse Square is maintained by the non-profit group The Friends of Rittenhouse Square. The square cuts 19th Street at Walnut Street and also at a half-block above Manning Street. Its boundaries are 18th Street to the east, Walnut Street to the north, and Rittenhouse Square West, a north–south boundary street, and Rittenhouse Square South, an east–west boundary street, making the park approximately two short blocks on each side. Locust Street is interrupted by Rittenhouse Square at 18th Street and Rittenhouse Square West.

== History ==
=== 19th century ===
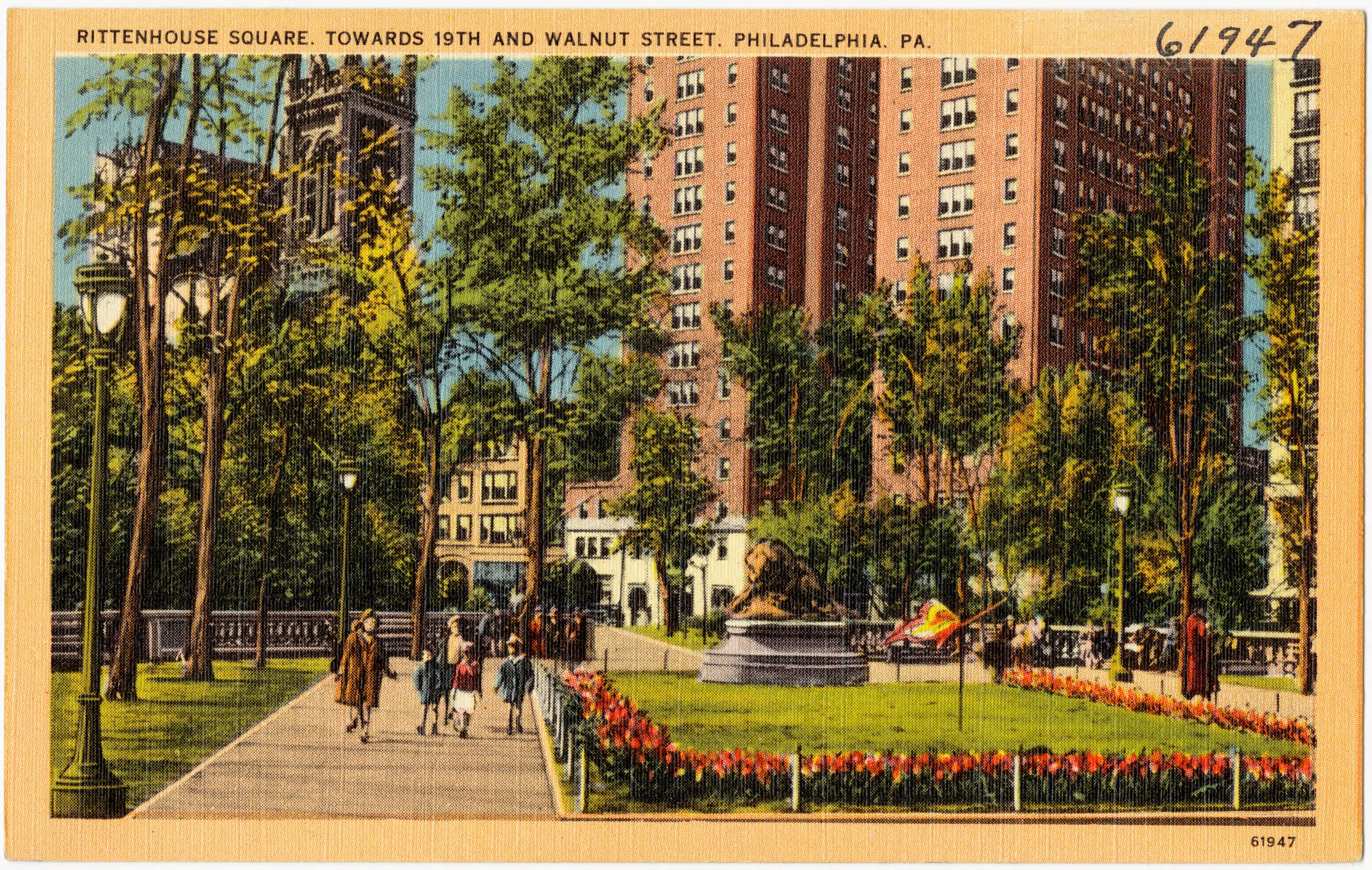
An early 20th century postcard of Rittenhouse Square looking towards 19th and Walnut streets

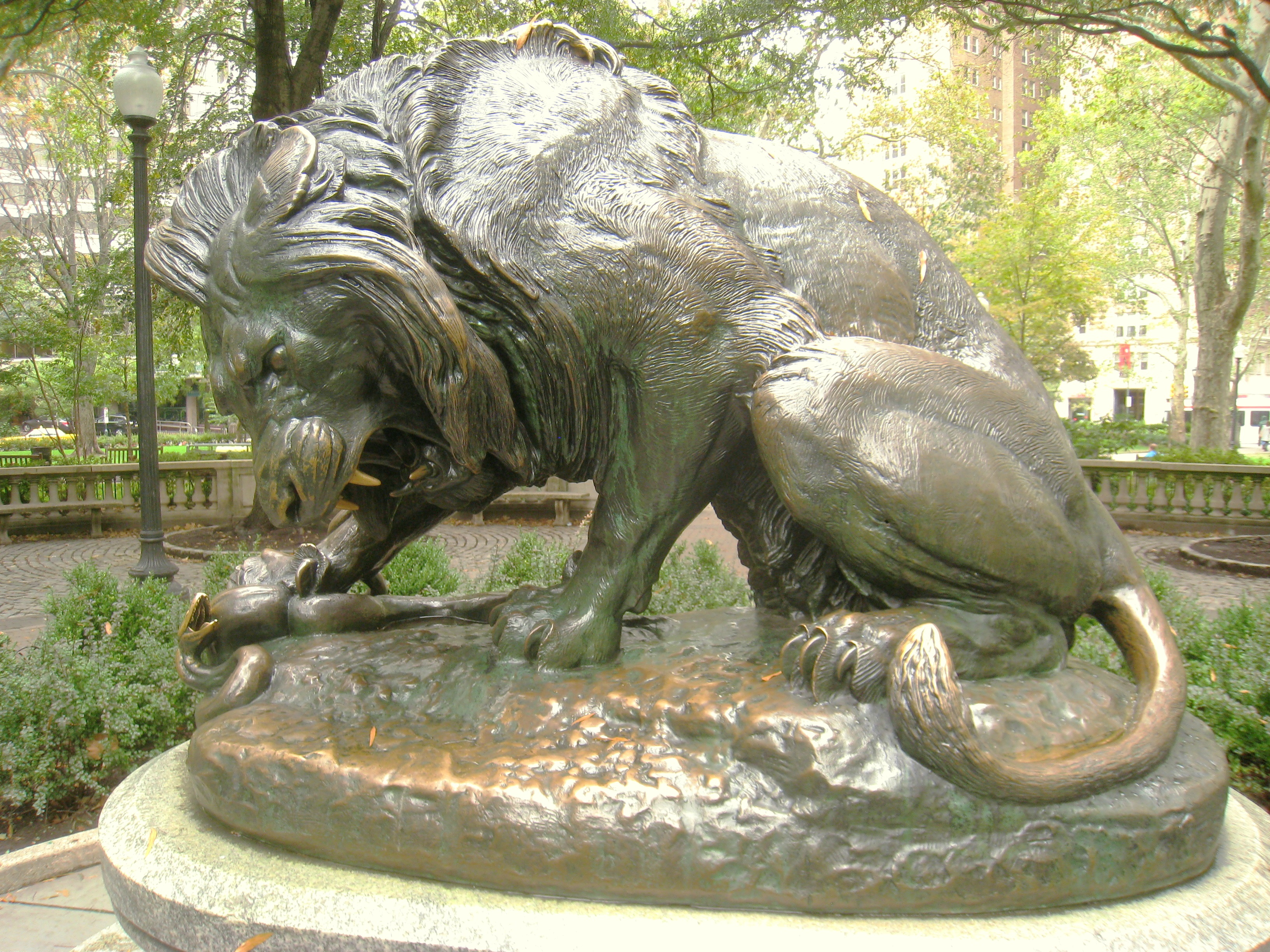
Lion with a Snake, a statue by Antoine-Louis Barye erected in 1832

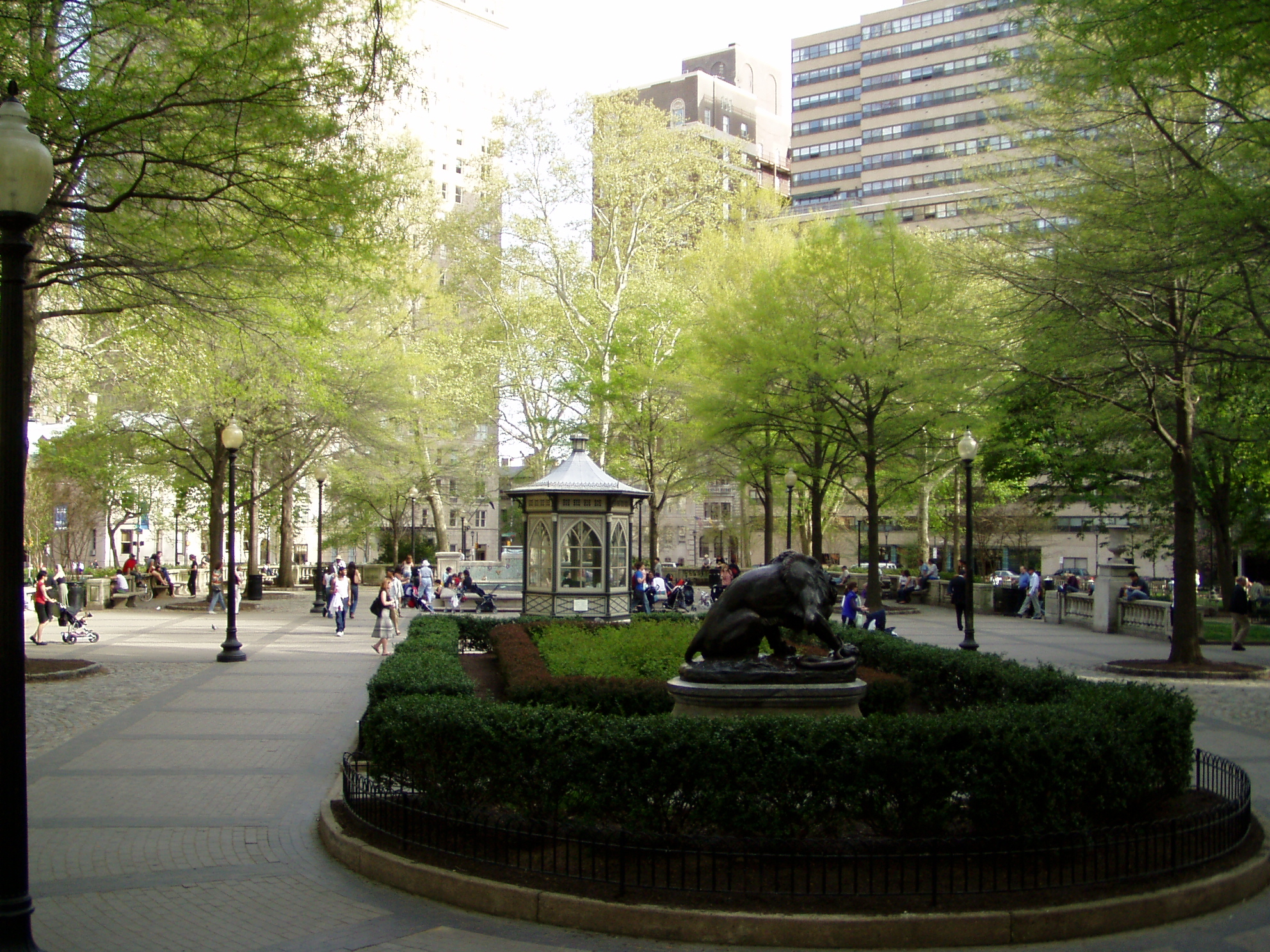
Rittenhouse Square in April 2006

Originally called Southwest Square, Rittenhouse Square was renamed in 1825 after David Rittenhouse, a descendant of the first paper-maker in Philadelphia, the German immigrant William Rittenhouse. William Rittenhouse's original paper-mill site is known as Rittenhousetown, located in the rural setting of Fairmount Park along Paper Mill Run. David Rittenhouse was a clockmaker and friend of the American Revolution, as well as a noted astronomer; a lunar crater is named after him.

In the early 19th century, as the city grew steadily from the Delaware River to the Schuylkill River, Rittenhouse Square became a highly desirable address. James Harper, a merchant and brick manufacturer who had recently retired from the United States Congress, was the first person to build on the square, buying most of the north frontage, erecting a stately townhouse for himself at 1811 Walnut Street (c. 1840). Having thus set the patrician residential tone that would subsequently define the Square, he divided the rest of the land into generously proportioned building lots and sold them. Sold after the congressman's death, the Harper house became the home of the exclusive Rittenhouse Club, which added the present facade in c. 1901.

From 1876 to 1929, Rittenhouse Square was home to several wealthy families including Pennsylvania Railroad president Alexander Cassatt, real estate entrepreneur William Weightman III, department store founder John Wanamaker, Philadelphia planning commission director Edmund Bacon and his son, actor Kevin Bacon, as well as others.

=== 20th century ===
Elegant churches and clubs were constructed by John Notman and Frank Furness. In 1913, French architect Paul Philippe Cret redesigned parts of the Square to resemble Paris and the French gardens, adding classical entryways and stone additions to railings, pools, and fountains.

After World War II, Rittenhouse Square's Victorian mansions began to be replaced with high-rise residential and office buildings such as Claridge and Savoy. Vacant lots were converted to apartments and hotels. Still, some prominent Italianate and Art Deco buildings remain, and Rittenhouse Square has changed the least out of the city's initial squares. Journalist and author Jane Jacobs wrote about two main ideas in Cret's redesign: intricacy and centering.

In the mid-20th century, the park became known as a safe area in Center City for Philadelphian gays and lesbians to meet.

=== 21st century ===
A pro-Palestinian protest was staged on November 8, 2026, in Rittenhouse Square by Philly Bike On Your Left, an "anti-fascist, anti-Zionist social cycling collective", asking people to boycott a group of six Jewish-owned restaurants. The event was criticized by Governor of Pennsylvania Josh Shapiro, Mayor of Philadelphia Cherelle Parker and by Attorney General of Pennsylvania Dave Sunday, who noted the event falling on the eve of the Nazi-era Kristallnacht and said that "explicitly targeting businesses because their owners are Jewish... falls back on some of the oldest antisemitic tropes and tactics in history." The group was met by "an overwhelming counter-demonstration", many of whom lined up to dine at the restaurants that had been targeted by the boycott. The organizers of the boycott, however, claimed to be misrepresented. They described themselves as a nonviolent group exercising their First Amendment rights, stating that the connection to the Kristallnacht anniversary was a complete coincidence and that allegations to the contrary were "simply false."

== Arts and culture ==
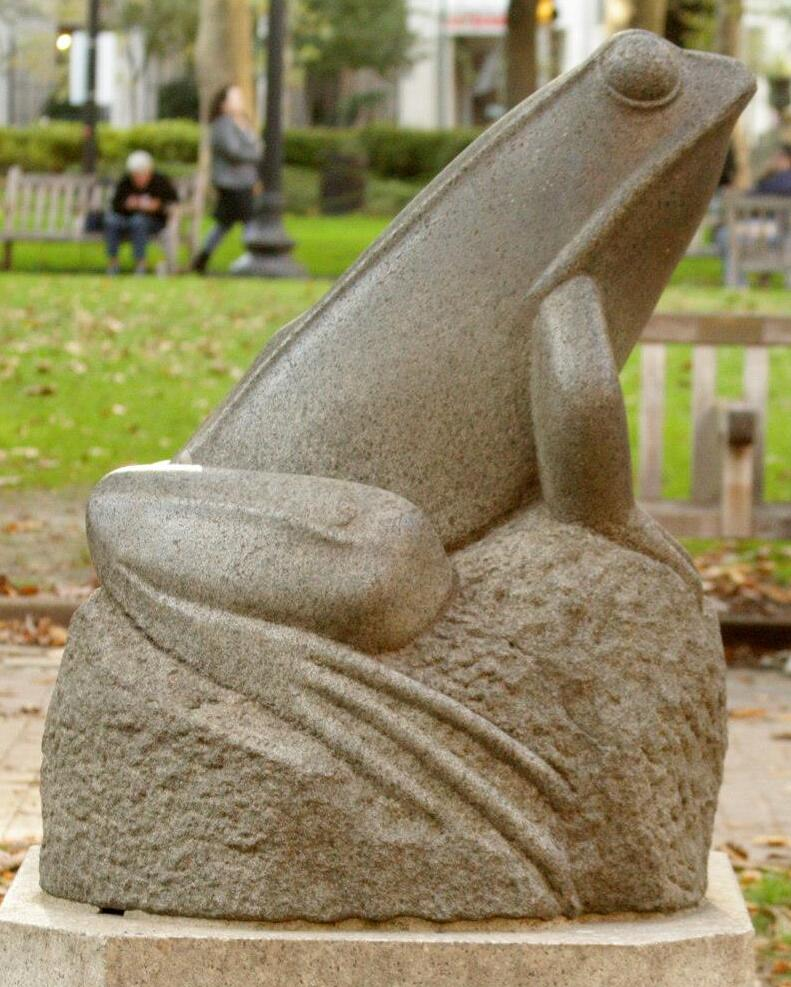
Frog by Cornelia Van Auken Chapin

Rittenhouse Square is surrounded by high rise residences, luxury apartments, an office tower, restaurants, and other businesses and residences. Its green grasses and dozens of benches are popular lunch-time destinations for residents and workers in Philadelphia's Center City neighborhood, while its lion and goat statues are popular gathering spots for small children and their parents. The park is a popular dog walking destination for area residents, as was shown in the fictional film In Her Shoes. The Square was discussed in a favorable light by Jane Jacobs in her seminal work, The Death and Life of Great American Cities.

The Rittenhouse neighborhood is home to many cultural institutions, including the Curtis Institute of Music, Philadelphia Youth Orchestra, the Ethical Society, the Philadelphia Art Alliance, the Rosenbach Museum & Library, Plays & Players, the Wine School of Philadelphia, and the Civil War and Underground Railroad Museum. Delancey Place is a quiet, historical street lined with Civil War-era mansions and the setting for Hollywood movies, located only two blocks south of the square.

The square is home to many works of public art. Among them is a bas-relief bust of J. William White done by R. Tait McKenzie. Billy, the goat was created by Philadelphian Albert Laessle, who also designed the Penguins statue at the Philadelphia Zoo.

== Education ==
Residents are in the Albert M. Greenfield School catchment area, named for Albert M. Greenfield, serves grades kindergarten through eight; all persons assigned to Greenfield are zoned to Benjamin Franklin High School. Previously South Philadelphia High School was the neighborhood's zoned high school.

The Curtis Institute of Music, and Peirce College are in the Rittenhouse neighborhood.

The Free Library of Philadelphia operates the Philadelphia City Institute on the first floor and lower level of an apartment complex at 1905 Locust Street; the apartment building is known as 220 West Rittenhouse Square.

== Transportation ==
Rittenhouse Square is accessible via several forms of public transportation.

All SEPTA Regional Rail lines stop at Suburban Station, about six blocks north and east of the Square.

The PATCO Speedline, a rapid transit system connecting Philadelphia and Southern New Jersey, has its western terminus at 16th and Locust Sts., two blocks east of the Square.

The SEPTA 9, 12, 21, and 42 buses westbound run along Walnut Street. The 17 runs northbound along 20th Street and southbound along 19th Street and Rittenhouse Square West and the 2 runs northbound along 16th Street and southbound along 17th Street.

The SEPTA subway–surface trolley lines have a station at 19th and Market Streets, two blocks north of the Square. The Walnut–Locust station on the Broad Street Subway is four blocks east.

== In film ==
=== 21st century ===
- The Golden Voice (2025), a film that pays tribute to the park’s cultural significance.
- Dispatches from Elsewhere (2020), the series prominently features the square in its episodes.
- The Upside (2019), features several notable Philadelphia sites, including Rittenhouse Square.
- Creed (2015), honors the Rocky legacy with scenes near the square.
- Silver Linings Playbook (2012), features various Philadelphia locations, including the square.
- Limitless (2011), a dive bar scene was filmed at a location near Rittenhouse Square.
- Transformers: Revenge of the Fallen (2009), some scenes shot in nearby areas include the park's surroundings.
- Law Abiding Citizen (2009), intense scenes filmed near Rittenhouse Square.
- Marley & Me (2008), some scenes were filmed near Broad and Walnut streets, close to Rittenhouse.
- The Happening (2008), M. Night Shyamalan's thriller used several Philly landmarks, including the park.
- The Wrestler (2008), key scenes use the park as a backdrop.
- In Her Shoes (2005), scenes were filmed throughout Philadelphia, with Rittenhouse Square as a major location.
- Rittenhouse Square (2005), documentary about the park by Robert Downey Sr.
- National Treasure (2004), some scenes show the square's surroundings.

=== 20th century ===
- The Sixth Sense (1999), locations around Rittenhouse contribute to the film's ambiance.
- Beloved (1998), includes exterior shots around Philadelphia and near Rittenhouse.
- 12 Monkeys (1995), Bruce Willis' character visits various Philly landmarks, including near the park.
- Philadelphia (1993), Tom Hanks' Oscar-winning role features scenes in and near the square.
- The Age of Innocence (1993), historic sites, including Rittenhouse Square, appear for authenticity.
- Mannequin (1987), features key scenes shot at various Philadelphia locations, including around Rittenhouse Square.
- Trading Places (1983), Billy Ray Valentine, played by Eddie Murphy, pretends to be a blind cripple in the park.
- Rocky II (1979), the iconic training montage features the area around the park.

== See also ==
- Cosmopolitan Club of Philadelphia
- Delancey Place
- List of parks in Philadelphia
