= Agapio Racing Team =

Defunct dubbing company based in Finland

Agapio Racing Team Oy (also known as Nordic Agapio) was a Finnish dubbing company that dubbed a number of cartoons for VHS release and Finnish television, primarily MTV3 and Nelonen. They also did regular dubbing of many cartoon releases by Future Films. The company was criticised for a lack of immersion and professionalism. The company eventually disassembled in 2002 after their last dubbing effort, Digimon Adventure, was taken over by Tuotantotalo Werne following public outrage (Only for the last half of the second season being aired in its original language with Finnish subtitles).

The recording voice-level for the dubs were often low. Some foul language was also used in Digimon dubs. The actors were mostly teenagers with limited voice acting experience. The quality of the scripts has been criticised, though a former Agapio employee defended this by saying that the translations usually came from translators outside the studio and that they were unable to accommodate the quick turnaround times expected of them.

The company was disestablished after its Digimon dub for Nelonen. Agapio Racing Team cast is sometimes referred to as "Digimon cast" after their work on Digimon.

== Actors ==
- Pauli Talikka
- Eeva Penttilä
- Valtteri Korpela
- Antti Kainiemi
- Lauri Putkonen
- Oskari Paavonkallio

== List of dubs ==
- My Little Pony
- My Little Pony Tales
- Calimero & Friends (episodes 1-26)
- The Spooktacular New Adventures of Casper
- The Legends of Treasure Island
- Flipper and Lopaka
- Ivanhoe the King's Knight
- The Care Bears
- Peter Pan & the Pirates
- Little Hippo
- Princess Sissi
- The Magic School Bus
- The Smurfs
- Digimon Adventure (episodes 1-26)

My Little Pony and The Smurfs had previously been dubbed by Golden Voice. The theme songs of Flipper & Lopaka, Calimero, and Digimon were both re-recorded for the Finnish version.

== See also ==
- Golden Voice Oy
- Tuotantotalo Werne
