= Antoine-Louis Barye =

French sculptor (1795–1875)

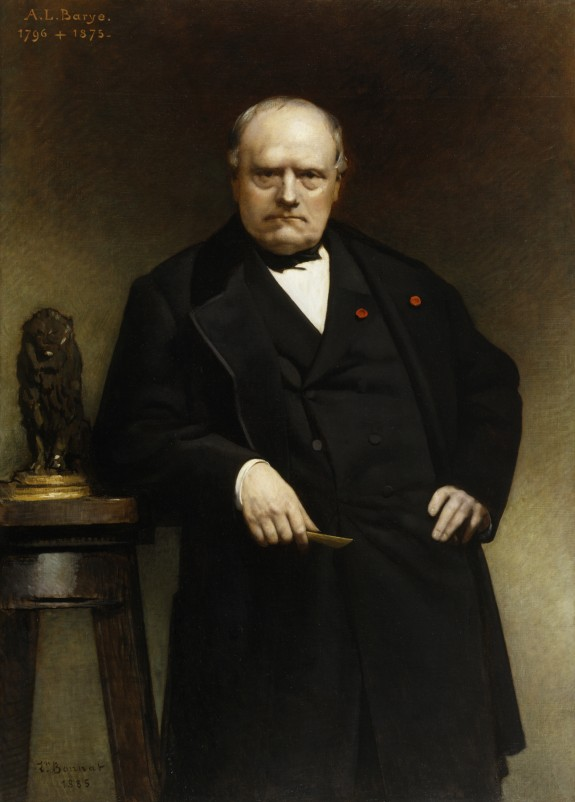
- Portrait by Léon Bonnat
- Born: 24 September 1795; Paris, French First Republic
- Died: 25 June 1875 (aged 79); Paris, French Third Republic
- Education: École des Beaux Arts
- Occupation: Sculptor
- Parent(s): Pierre and Marguerite Barye

Antoine-Louis Barye (French pronunciation: [ɑ̃twan lwi baʁi]; 24 September 1795 – 25 June 1875) was a Romantic French sculptor known for his work as an animalier, a sculptor of animals. His son and student was the sculptor Alfred Barye.

== Biography ==
Born in Paris, France, Barye began his career as a goldsmith, like many sculptors of the Romantic Period. He first worked under his father Pierre, and around 1810 worked under the sculptor Martin-Guillaume Biennais, who was a goldsmith to Napoleon. After studying under sculptor Francois-Joseph Bosio in 1816, and painter Baron Antoine-Jean Gros, he was in 1818 admitted to the École des Beaux-Arts. But it was not until 1823, while working for the goldsmith Emile Fauconnier that he discovered his true predilection from watching the animals in the Jardin des Plantes, making vigorous studies of them in pencil drawings comparable to those of Delacroix, then modeling them in sculpture on a large or small scale.

In 1819 while he was studying at the École des Beaux-Arts, Barye sculpted a medallion named Milo of Crotana Devoured by a Lion, in which the lion bites into Milo's left thigh. Milo's theme was the school's official theme for the medallion competition of 1819, where Barye earned an honorable mention. c. 1820 Barye sculpted Hercules with the Erymanthean Boar, depicting Hercules's fourth Labor, where he had to capture a live wild boar from Mount Erymanthos.

Barye was no less successful in sculpture on a small scale, and excelled in representing animals in their most familiar attitudes. Barye sculpted the portrait medallion Young Man in a Beret (1823) in bronze, as well as Portrait of the Founder Richard (1827), in which only a head and neck are shown. He also sculpted Poised Stag (1829), a much larger sculpture, which had a height of 48 cm, and was one-third life size.

Barye didn't only want to be known as a sculptor of small bronzes, he wanted to be known as a sculpteur statuaire (a sculptor of large statues). In 1831 he exhibited much larger statues, Tiger Devouring a Gavial Crocodile which was a plaster sculpture 41 cm high and 103 cm long, and Lion Crushing a Serpent, 138 cm high and 178 cm long, made in bronze. In 1832 had truly mastered a style of his own in the Lion with a Snake.

Barye, though engaged in a perpetual struggle with want, exhibited year after year studies of animals, admirable groups which reveal him as inspired by a spirit of true romance and a feeling for the beauty of the antique, as in his Theseus and the Minotaur (1843), Roger and Angelica on the Hippogriff (1846)), Lapitha and Centaur (1848), Jaguar Devouring a Hare (1850), and numerous minor works now very highly valued. The latter two works were exhibited at the Paris Salon of 1850, causing Théophile Gautier to observe:"The mere reproduction of nature does not constitute art; Barye aggrandizes his animal subjects, simplifying them, idealizing and stylizing them in a manner that is bold, energetic, and rugged, that makes him the Michelangelo of the menagerie."

Examples of his larger work include the Lion of the Column of July, of which the plaster model was cast in 1839, various lions and tigers in the gardens of the Tuileries, and the four groups War, Peace, Strength, and Order (1854).

While Barye excelled at sculpture, he often faced financial burdens due to his lack of business knowledge. In 1848 he was forced to declare bankruptcy, and all of his work and molds were sold to a foundry. The foundry began making inferior work from 1848 to 1857, and his reputation suffered during this time. In 1876 what remained of Barye's inventory, 125 models, were sold to the Ferdinand Barbedienne foundry. The 1877 Barbedienne catalogue offered all of the models in bronze in variable sizes, and the Barbedienne castings were of superb quality.

Fame did not come until later in life. In 1854 he was made Professor of Drawings at the Museum of Natural History, and was elected to the Académie des beaux-arts in 1868. He produced no new works after 1869.

Barye is associated with the French animalier school and is known for his sculptures of animals. His work influenced later artists in the field, including, Emmanuel Fremiet, Paul-Edouard Delabrierre, Auguste Cain, and Georges Gardet.

There is a public square on the eastern tip of Île Saint-Louis in Paris dedicated to him.

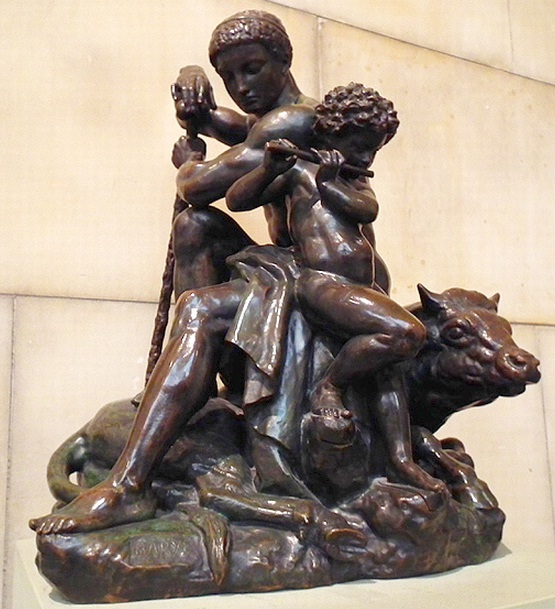
Hercules Sitting on a Bull, 1830s (National Museum, Warsaw)

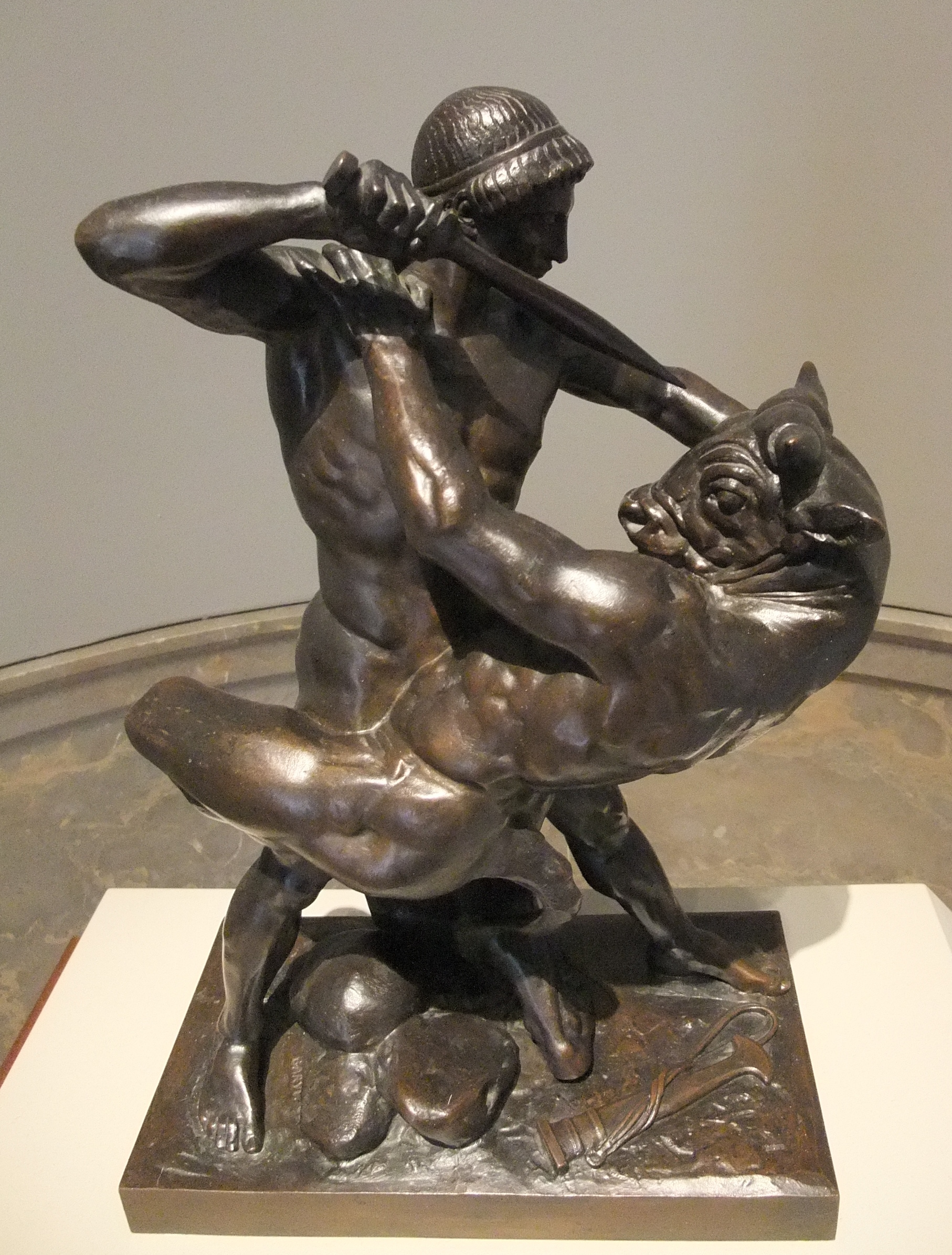
Theseus and the Minotaur, 1843 (Baltimore Museum of Art)

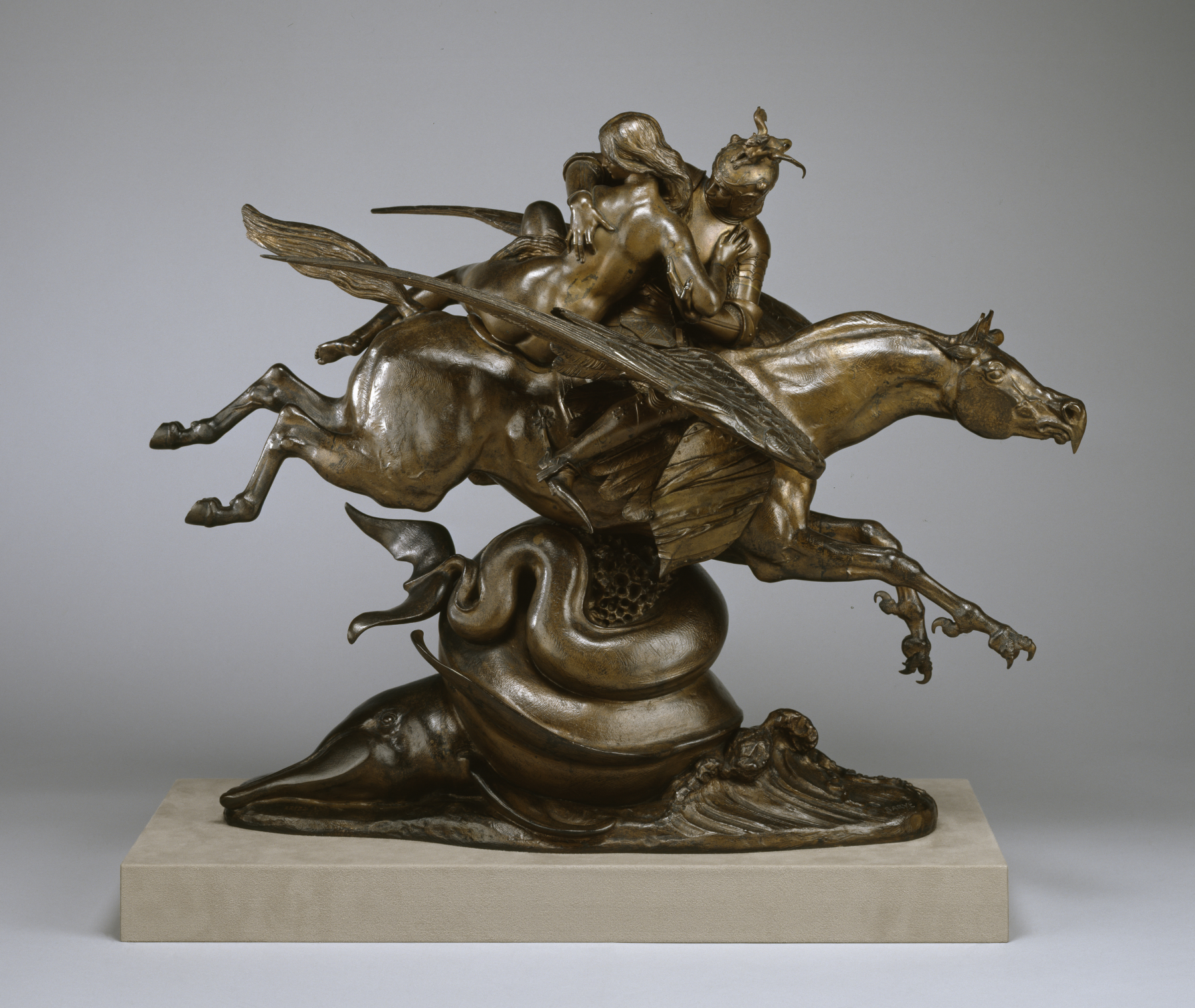
Roger and Angelica Mounted on the Hippogriff, 1846 (Walters Art Museum)

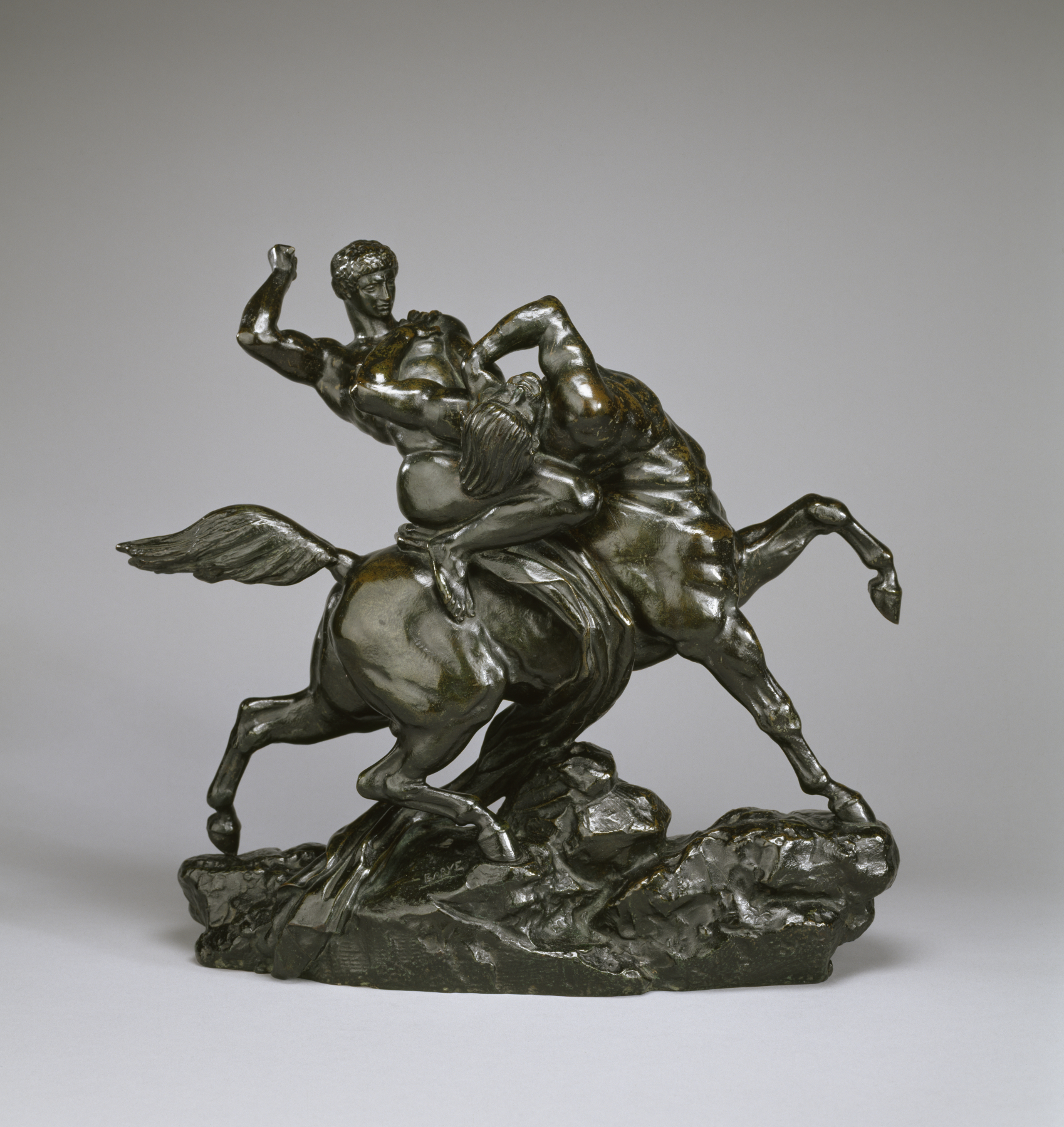
Lapith Combating a Centaur, 1848

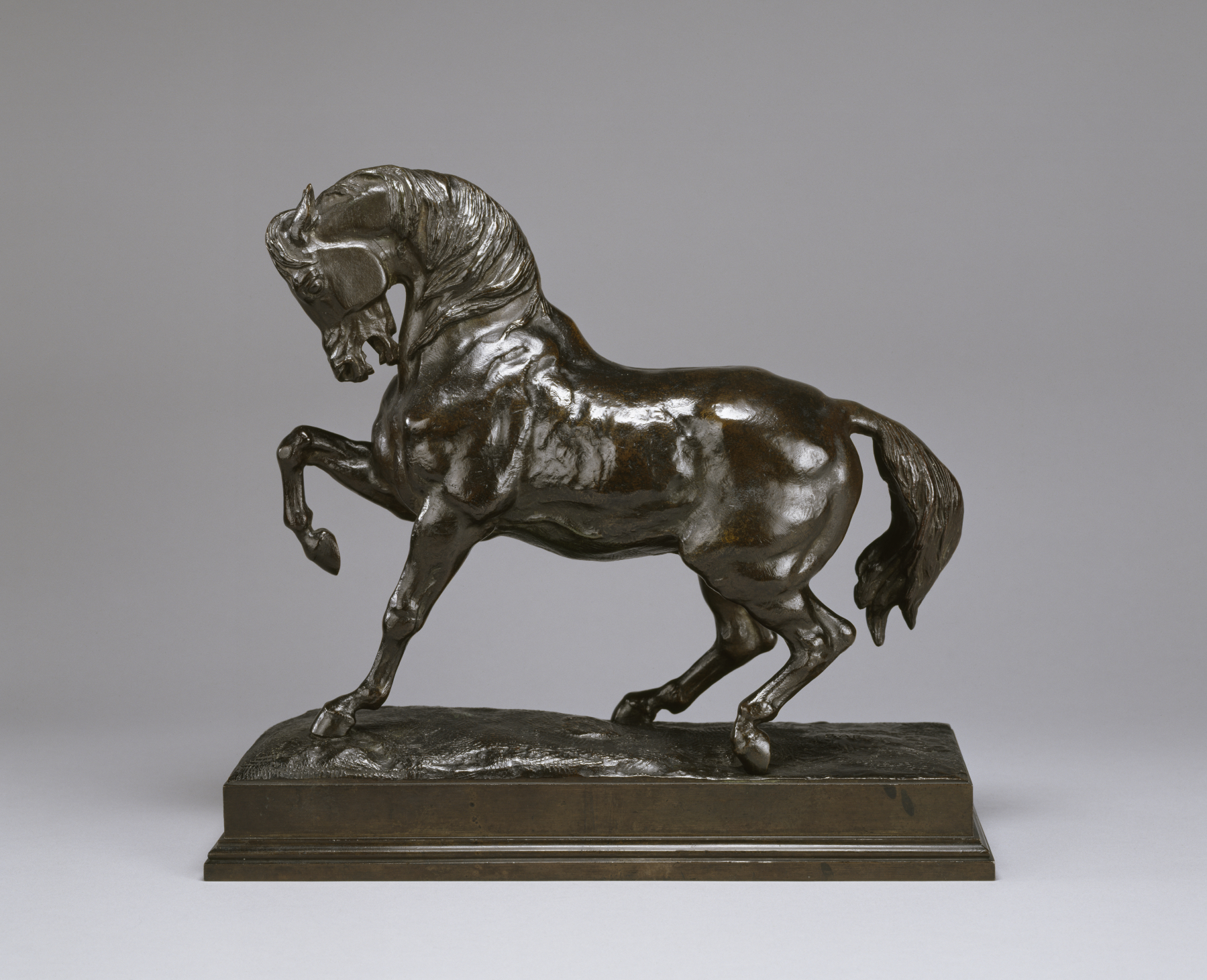
Turkish Horse, No. 2, modeled c. 1844 (Walters Art Museum)

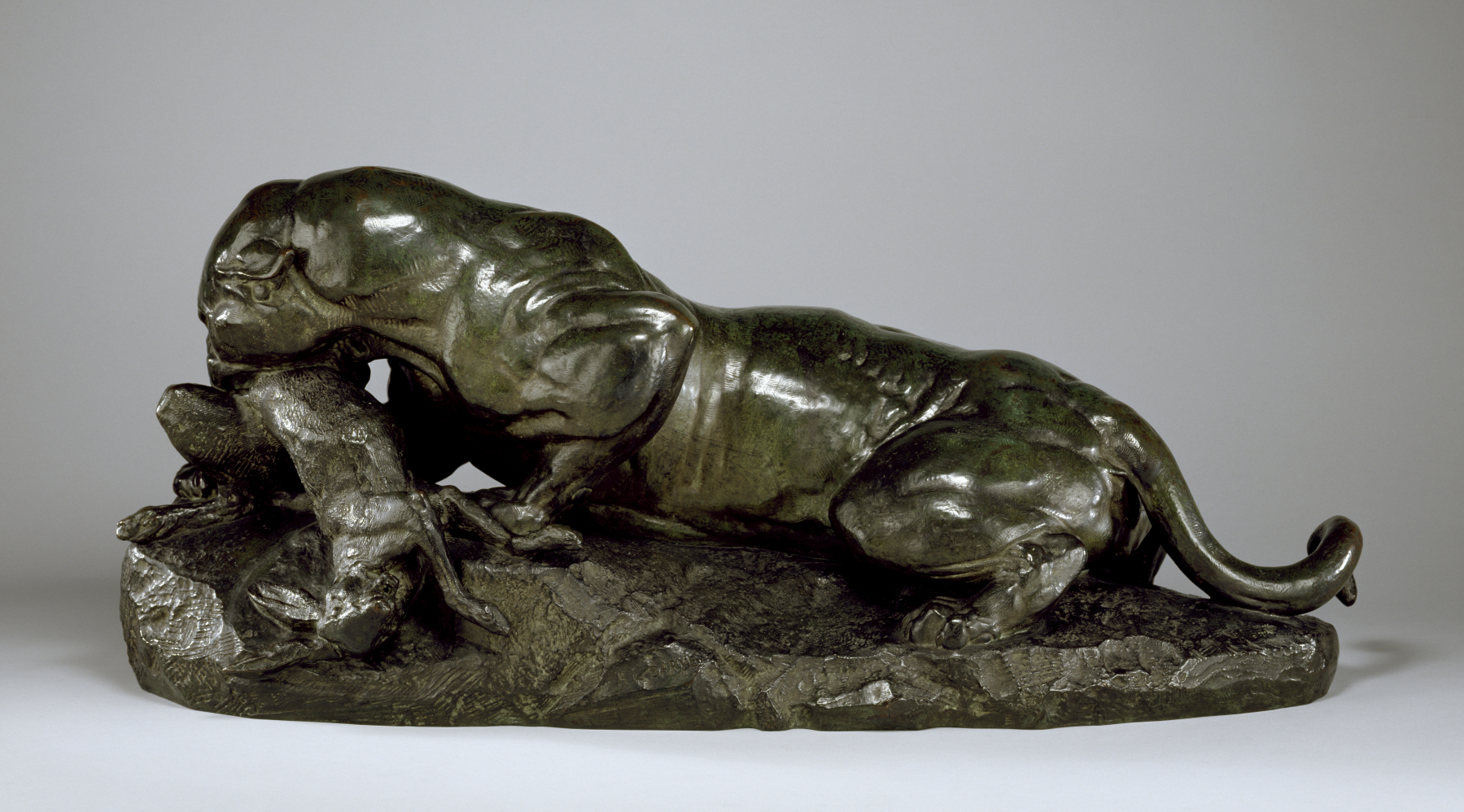
Jaguar Devouring a Hare, 1850 (Walters Art Museum)

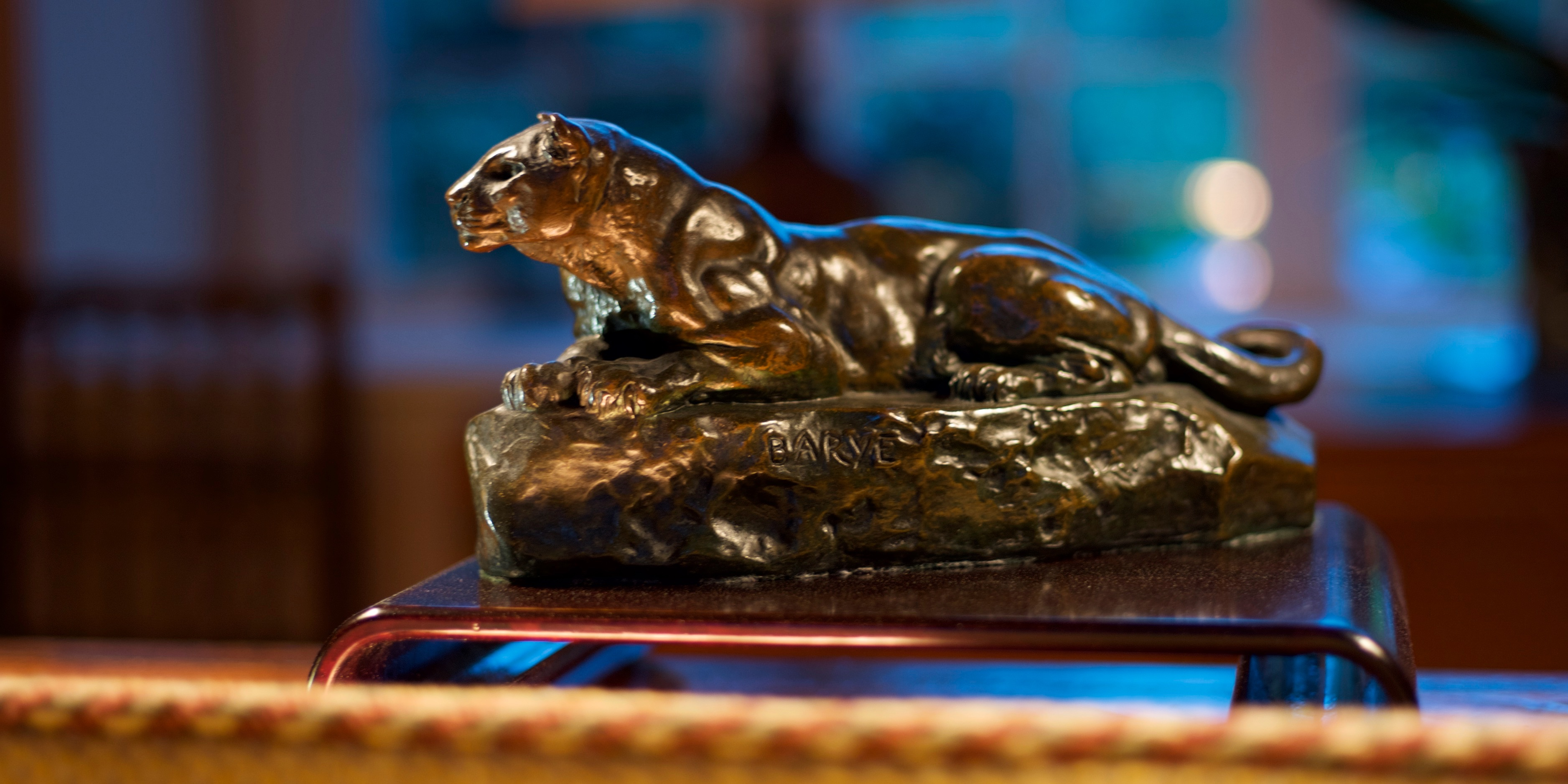
Bronze sculpture by Antoine-Louis Barye: “The Panther of Tunis”

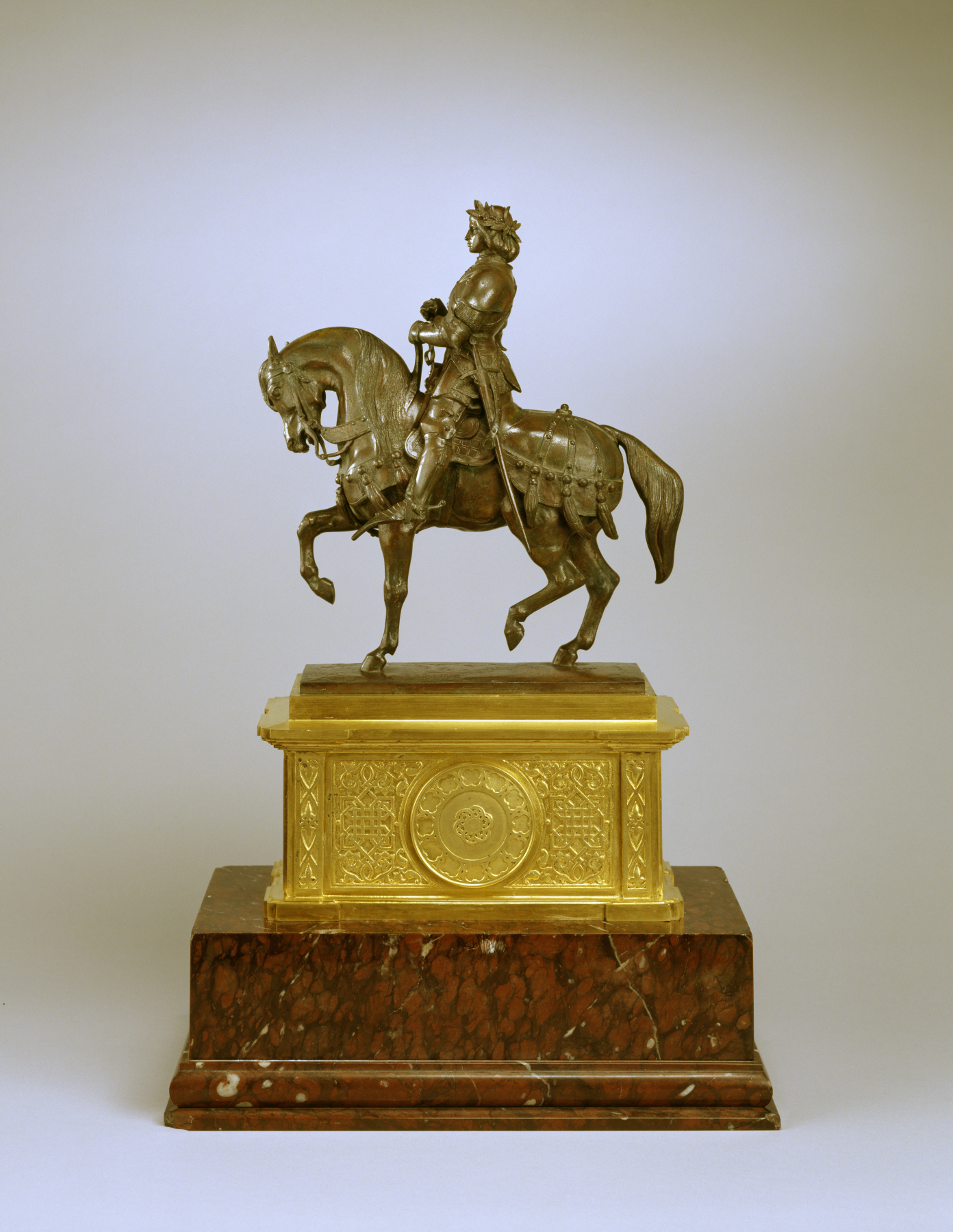
Charles VII, the Victorious (Walters Art Museum)

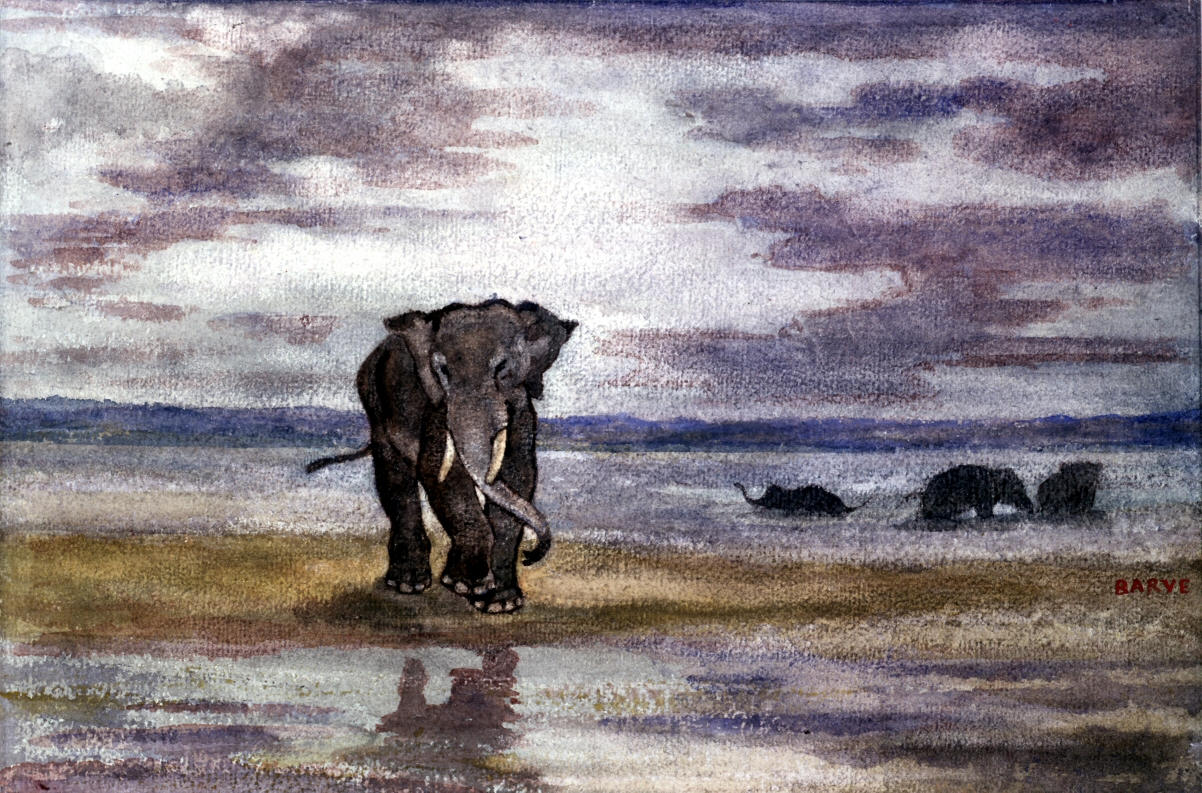
Elephants in Water (Walters Art Museum)

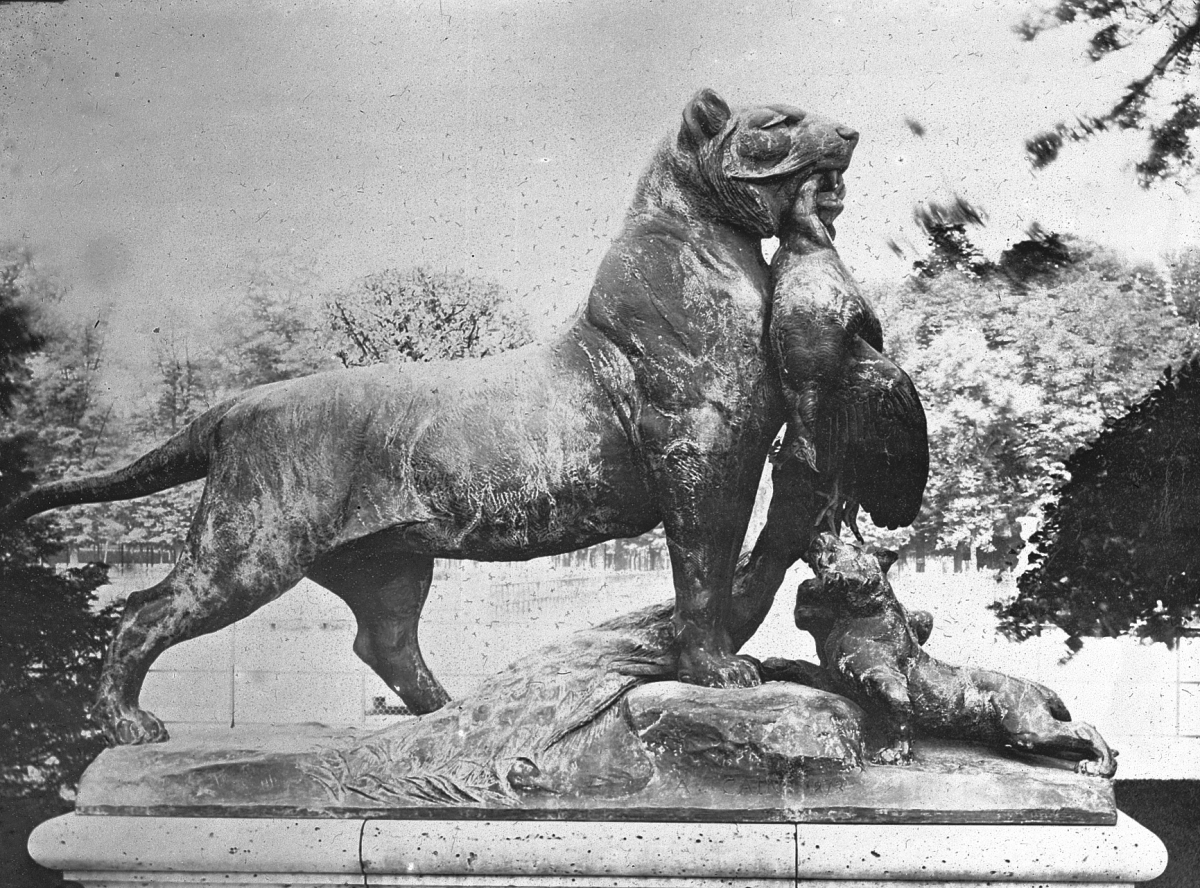
Paris, France. Statue of tiger. Brooklyn Museum Archives, Goodyear Archival Collection.

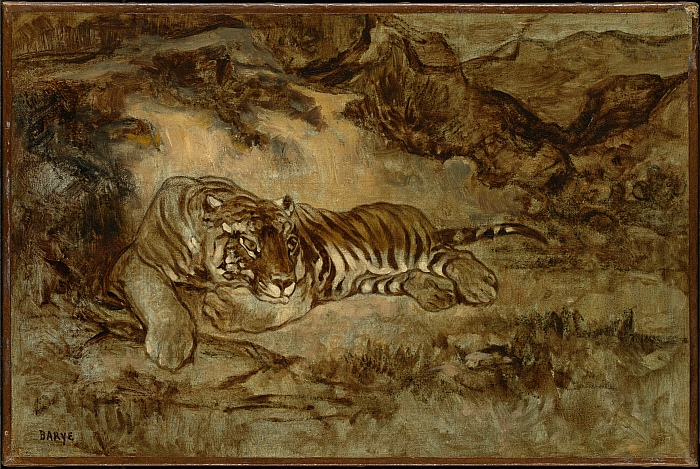
Antoine-Louis Barye, Tiger at Rest (c. 1850–70), oil and charcoal on paper, mounted on canvas, 12 3/16 x 18 1/4 in. (31 x 46.5 cm) Clark Art Institute

== Family ==
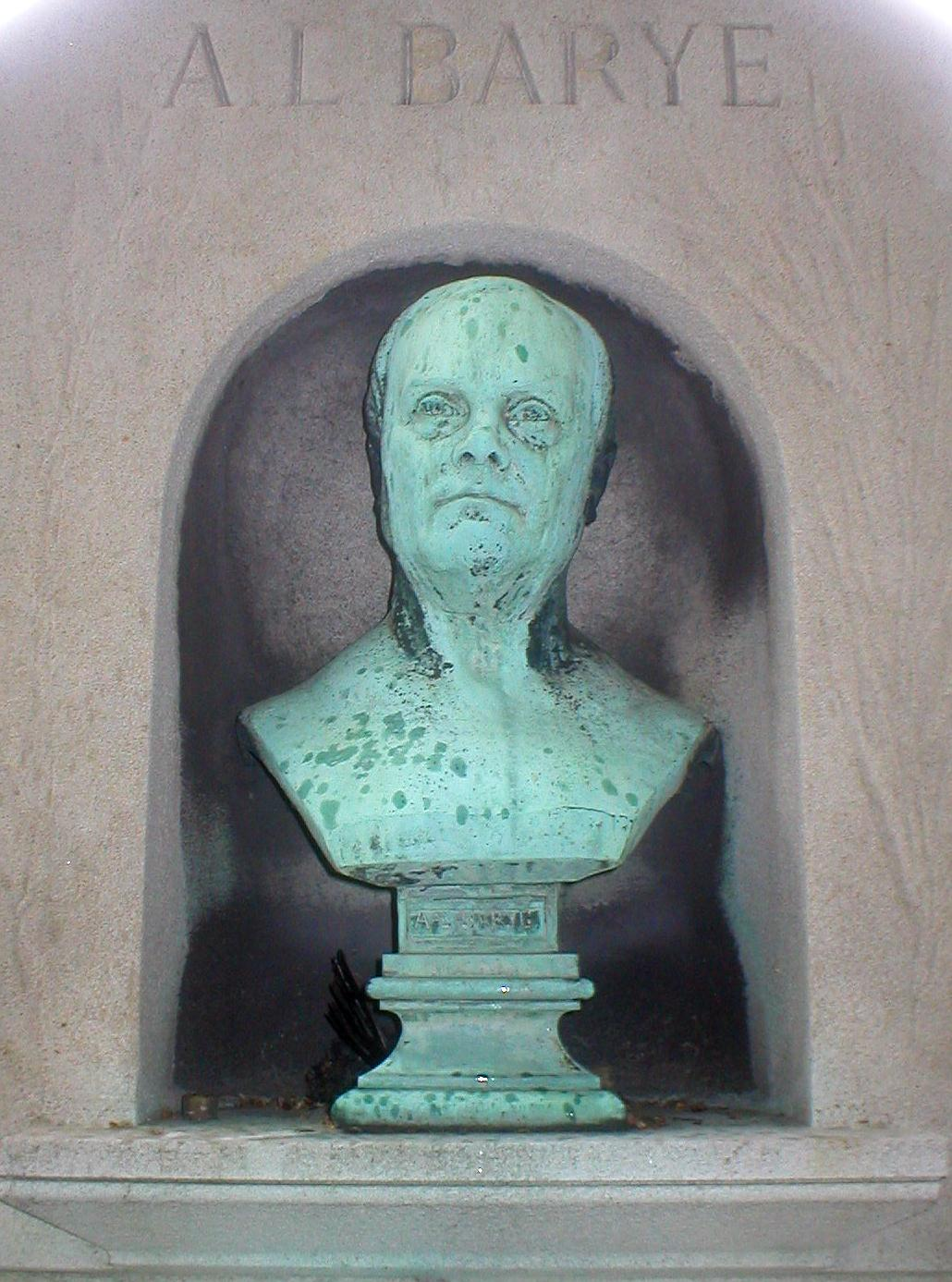
Tomb and bust of Antoine-Louis Barye at the Père Lachaise Cemetery

Barye had a son, Alfred Barye, who studied under him and also became an animalier sculptor. Alfred, although very competent in his own right as a sculptor, would struggle to gain notoriety working in the shadow of his more famous father. Antoine-Louis was not pleased when his son began signing work as "A. Barye" because he thought this created confusion between his work and that of his son. He forced his son to sign as "A. Barye, fils" or "Alf Barye" in order to distinguish their works. The senior Barye signed only one way throughout his entire career, simply marking his bronzes "Barye".

== See also ==
- Émile-Coriolan Guillemin

== Sources ==
- Joseph G. Reinis, The Founders and Editors of The Barye Bronzes (New York, 2007)
- William R. Johnston, Simon Kelly et al Untamed (New York, 2006)
- Benge, Glenn F. Antonine-Louis Barye, Sculptor of Romantic Realism. Pennsylvania: The Pennsylvania State University, 1984. Print.
- Wharry, David et al. A Guide to the Louvre. Ghent, Belgium: Snoeck-Ducaju & Zoon, 2005. Print.
