= Tuotantotalo Werne =

Finnish audio-visual production company

Tuotantotalo Werne was a Finnish company that provided audio-visual productions in Finland and all across the Baltic countries.

They are also known for a number of children's cartoon dubs made for MTV3 and Nelonen, largely supplementing the now defunct Agapio Racing Team in the early 2000s. They began to gather popularity after the success of Pokémon.

== Famous dubs ==
- Avatar
- Animaniacs
- Battle B-Daman
- Batman: The Animated Series
- Lazy Lucy
- Rugrats
- The Powerpuff Girls
- Horrid Henry (TV series)
- LazyTown
- Caillou
- Superman
- Power Rangers
- TaleSpin
- Jesus and Josephine
- Digimon Adventure (episodes 27-54)
- Digimon Adventure 02 (episodes 01-27)
- VeggieTales
- Bob the Builder
- Little Einsteins

Tuotantotalo Werne took over the dubbing duties for Digimon Adventure from Agapio Racing Team from episode 27 onwards. Starting from season three onwards the show has been seen in Japanese with Finnish subtitles.

Dubbed the 2006 re-release of Biker Mice from Mars, that was previously dubbed by Film&Cartoon Finland in the 1990s.

== See also ==
- Golden Voice OY
- Agapio Racing Team
