= Future Film =

Finnish home video distribution company

Future Film Ltd (Future Film Oy) is a Finnish-based home-video distribution company headquartered in Vaasa. From early to late 1990s they were best known as the distributors of children's animation. Future Film's releases were dubbed occasionally by Golden Voice OY (such as the wildly popular Ginga: Nagareboshi Gin) but most frequently they utilized the services of Agapio Racing Team.

In recent years they have become prolific distributors of anime. Their releases include titles such as Love Hina and School Rumble, Fruits Basket, Berserk, Ginga Densetsu Weed and so on. This move was possibly motivated by the popularity of the uncut DVD version of Nagareboshi Gin. Also possibly due to this move, their current anime releases feature subtitles rather than dubbing, which is actually the preferred standard for most television programs and theatrical films in Finland.

Additionally Future Film has been doing motion-picture home video releases since the early 1990s.

In 2011, Future Film bought the film distributor Sandrew Metronome Distribution Finland Oy from the Norwegian Schibsted Media Group.

== Filmography ==
- 2015: A Perfect Man of Yann Gozlan

== Corporate affairs ==
The corporate headquarters and warehouse of Future Film are located in Vaasa. The firm has an office in Helsinki and a premiere movies warehouse in Vantaa.
