= Alfred Barye =

French sculptor (1839–1882)

Alfred Barye "Le Fils"
- Born: Alfred Barye; 21 January 1839; Paris, France
- Died: 1882 (aged 42–43); Paris, France
- Known for: Sculpture
- Notable work: The Arab Warrior Knight on Horseback
- Movement: Animalier and wildlife art

Alfred "Alf" Barye (French pronunciation: [alf(ʁɛd) baʁi]; 21 January 1839 – 1882), usually known as Alfred Barye "Le Fils" (i.e. "Alfred Barye Jr."), was a French sculptor, of the Belle Époque, pupil of his father the artist Antoine-Louis Barye. In cooperation with Émile-Coriolan Guillemin, Barye did the artwork for "The Arab Warrior Knight on Horseback". Included in Barye's oeuvre were animalier bronzes as well as Oriental subjects. At his father's request, he signed his work as "fils" to differentiate his work from his father's.

== Early life ==
Alfred Barye was born in Paris, France, on 21 January 1839, the son of Antoine-Louis Barye. He learned his craft of animalier sculptor under the watchful eye of his father who was one of the original pioneers of animal sculpture in the mid-to-late 19th century. The younger Barye didn't always get along with his father; there were times when the two of them were not on speaking terms. Until instructed not to do so, Alfred Barye signed some of his bronzes "A. Barye", which the senior Barye objected to because it created confusion as to which Barye, father or son, created the sculpture.

== Career ==
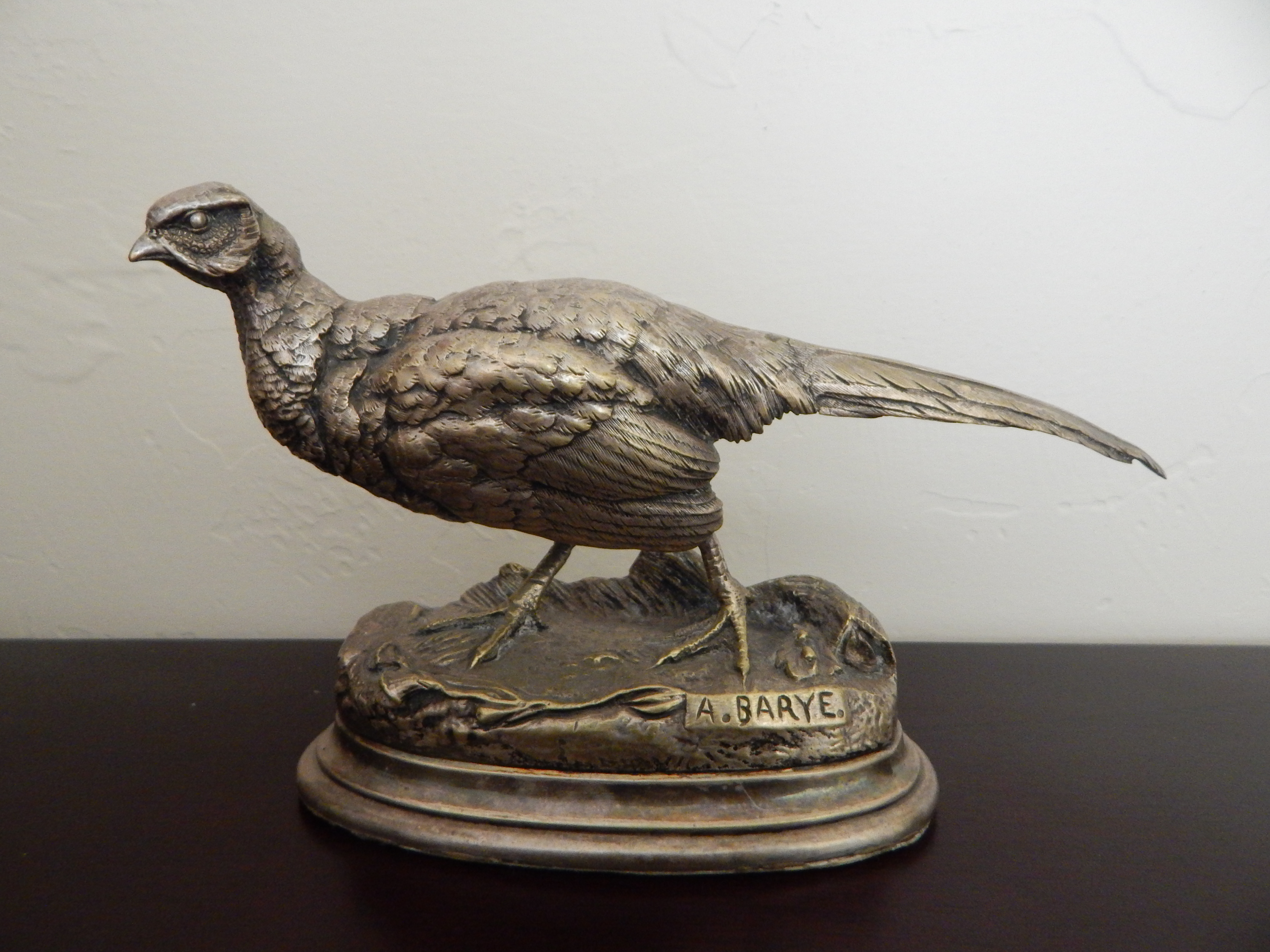
A silvered bronze sculpture of a pheasant by Barye (c. 1875)

He specialized in the animalier school in the production of bronze sculptures. Although a fine artist in his own right, he struggled to create his own identity living in the shadow of his more famous father. The vast majority of his pieces are signed "A. Barye, fils" while some are marked "Barye" or "A. Barye" which created some confusion – intentional or not – with those of his father. The majority of the sculptures leaving the Barye foundry were sand castings rather than lost-wax castings. Alfred Barye typically used mid-brown patinas but would sometimes add green (a color famously used by his father) and auburn-colored hues in the patination process. Any Barye bronze – by father or son – will generally have an exquisite patina. Antoine-Louis was particularly finicky with his patinas and would not allow other foundries to apply them, preferring to do it himself for appearance and quality control purposes. Alfred, too, would not let a sculpture leave his workshop without a perfectly applied and visually pleasing patina.

Alfred Barye did a production of bronze sculptures and focused his attention on race horses or horses on the move. Some of his well-known bronzes are The Arab Warrior Knight on Horseback (1890–1910, made in Paris, height 87 cm, width 61 cm, depth 30 cm, bronze).

== Death and legacy ==
Barye died in Paris in 1882. He is known for the precision detail in his bronze sculptures, as shown in the pheasant sculpture (pictured right). Barye was known for great attention to detail on his bronzes. He produced a number of bird sculptures as well as genre figures. Alfred Barye's final submission at the Salon de Louvre was in 1882. He received posthumous "honourable mention" in the 1897 Salon for the work Aide Fauconnier Indien, Retour de Chasse à la Gazelle.

== Museum holdings ==
His bronzes are now in many museum collections:

- Louvre Museum, Paris
- Musée d'Orsay, Paris
- Brooklyn Museum, New York City
- Fogg Museum, Harvard Art Museums, Cambridge, Massachusetts
- Bush-Reisinger Museum, Harvard Art Museums, Cambridge, Massachusetts
- Arthur M. Sackler Museum, Harvard Art Museums, Cambridge, Massachusetts
- São Paulo Museum of Modern Art, Brazil
- The Israel Museum, Jerusalem
- Appleton Museum of Art, Ocala, Florida

== Exhibitions ==
Alfred Barye exhibited works at the Paris Salon on four occasions between 1864 and 1882, including the following bronzes:

- The racehorse Walter Scott, 1864
- Italian jester, 1882

== Signature examples ==
Signature of Alfred Barye

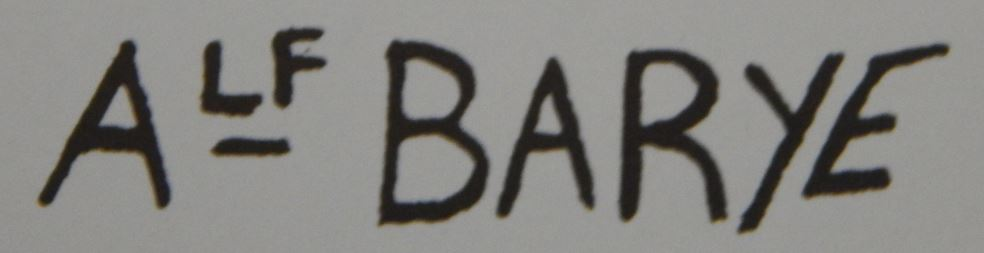
Alternate signature of Alfred Barye

== See also ==
- Equestrian statue
- Antoine-Louis Barye, the father
- Émile-Coriolan Guillemin
- Animalier
- Belle Époque

== Bibliography ==
- Patricia Janis Broder, Bronzes of the American West, H. N. Abrams, 1974
- News, Volumi 29–30, Baltimore Museum of Art, 1967
- Musée du Louvre. Département des sculptures, Françoise Baron, Corinne Jankowiak, Christine Vivet, Geneviève Bresc-Bautier, Isabelle Lemaistre, Guilhem Scherf, Jean-Charles Agboton-Jumeau, Sculpture française: Renaissance et temps modernes, Réunion des musées nationaux, 1998
- Théophile Thoré, Les Salons: Salons de 1864–1868, H. Lamertin, 1893
- Stanislas Lami, Dictionnaire des sculpteurs de l'École française, Volume 8, Champion, 1921
- Dictionnaire universel des contemporains contenant toutes les ..., Volume 1, 1870
- Musée du Louvre (Paris). Département des sculptures du Moyen Age, de la Renaissance et des temps modernes, Musée national du Louvre (Paris). Département des sculptures, Sculpture française, Réunion des musées nationaux, 1998
- The Sculpture Journal, Volume 6, Public Monuments and Sculpture Association, 2001
- The University of Rochester Library Bulletin, Volumi 38–43, University of Rochester Library, 1985
- The São Paulo Collection: From Manet to Matisse, Mazzotta, 1989
- Arlene Hirschfelder, Paulette F. Molin, Yvonne Wakim, American Indian Stereotypes in the World of Children: A Reader and Bibliography
- Fogg Art Museum Handbooks, Editions 4, Harvard University, 1983
- Pierre Kjellberg, Les Bronzes du XIXe Siècle, 1986, (p. 369, "the Arab warrior knight on horseback")
- Eleonora Luciano, William U. Eiland, Georgia Museum of Art, Animals in bronze: the Michael and Mary Erlanger collection of animailer bronzes, Georgia Museum of Art, University of Georgia, 1996
- Elisabeth Hardouin-Fugier, Le peintre et l'animal en France au XIXe siècle, Éditions de l'Amateur, 2001
- Harold Berman, Bronzes; Sculptors & Founders, 1800–1930, Volume 2, Abage, 1976
- Yves Devaux, L'univers des bronzes et des fontes ornementales: chefs-d'œuvre et curiosités, 1850–1920, Éditions Pygmalion, 1978
- Arts Magazine, Volume 17, Art Digest Incorporated, 1942
- Théophile Thoré, 1864–1868
