= Lion with a Snake =

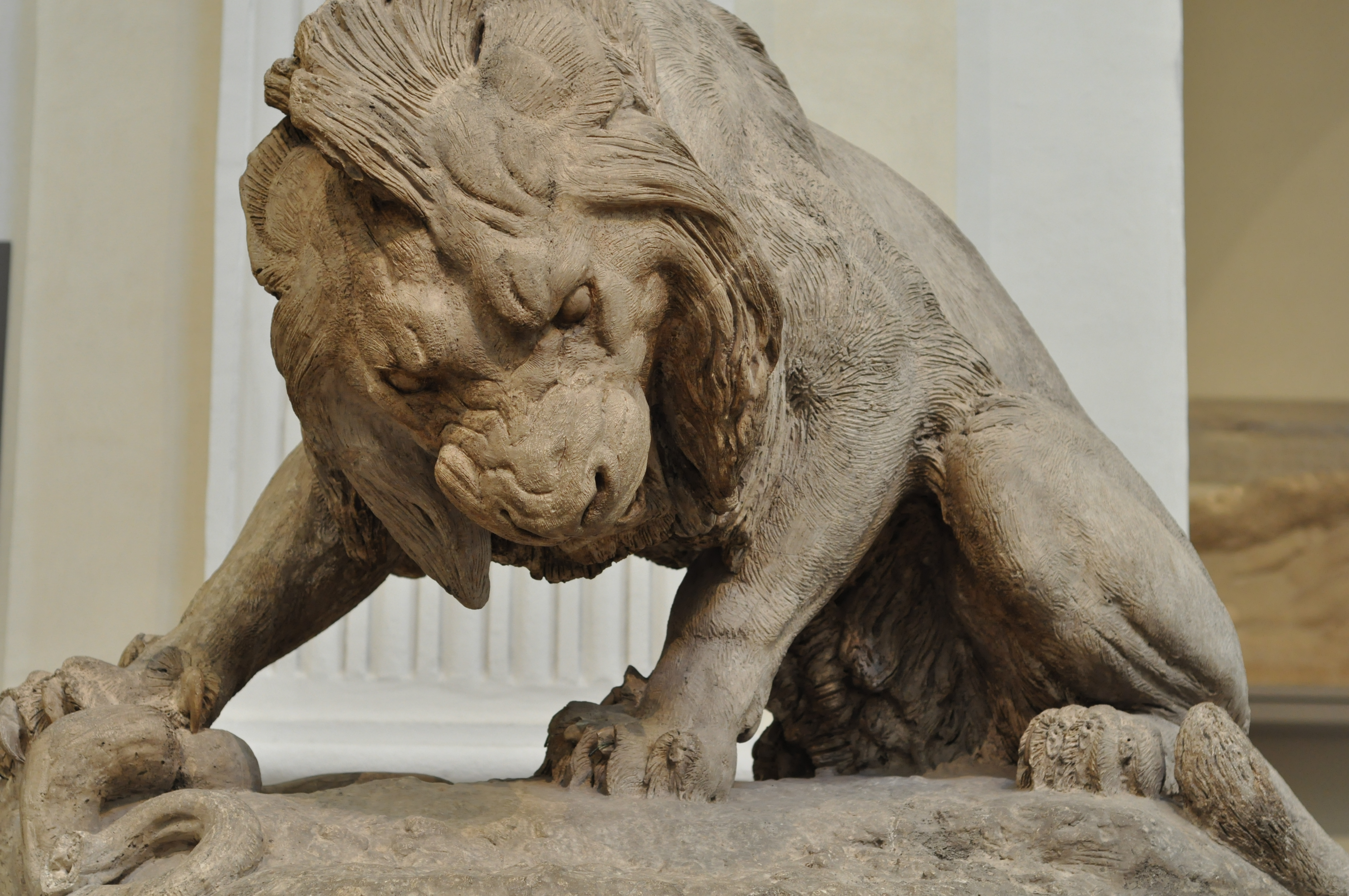
The original plaster version, cast in 1832, now housed at the Museum of Fine Arts of Lyon

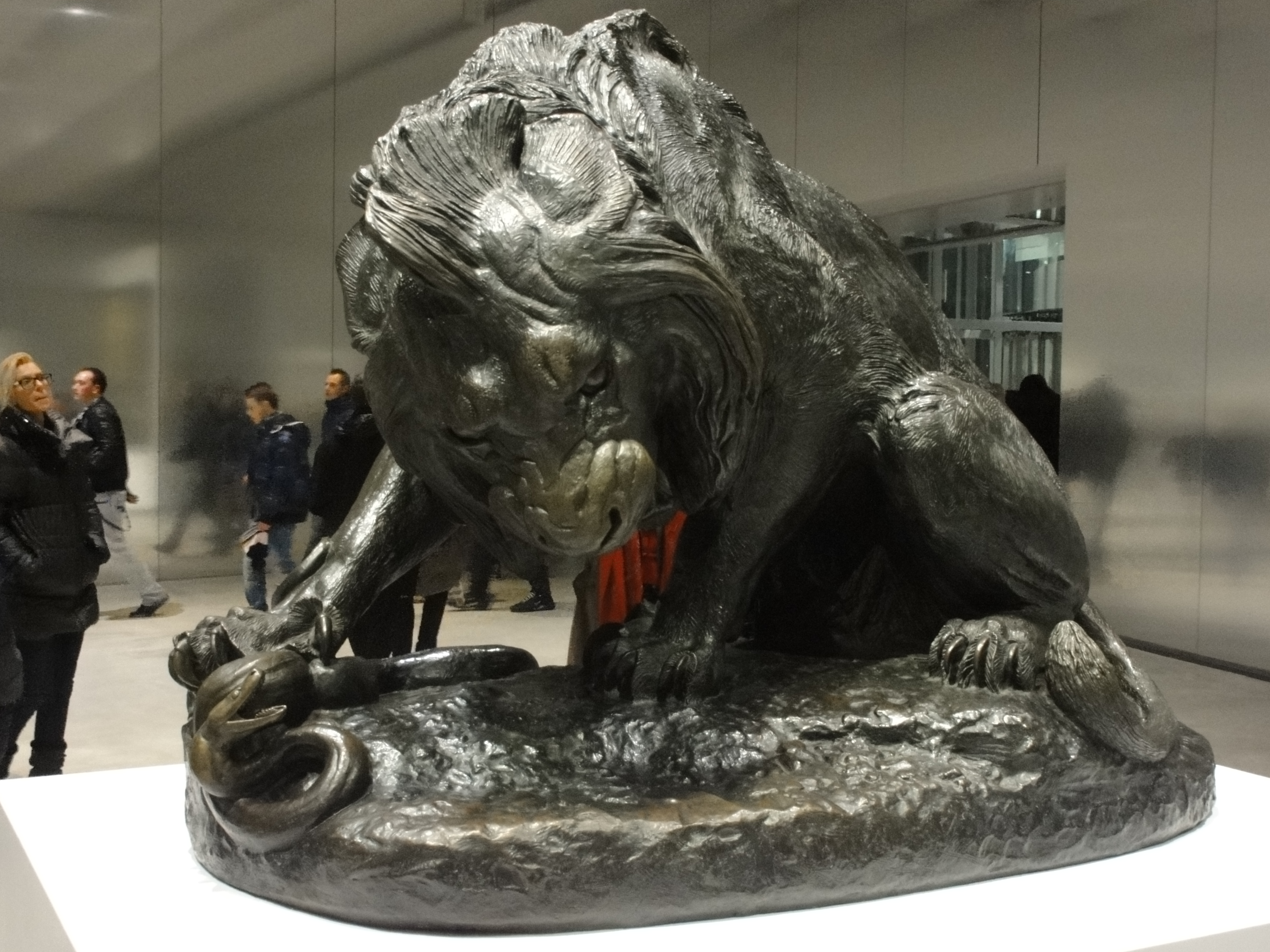
The original bronze cast now housed in the Louvre

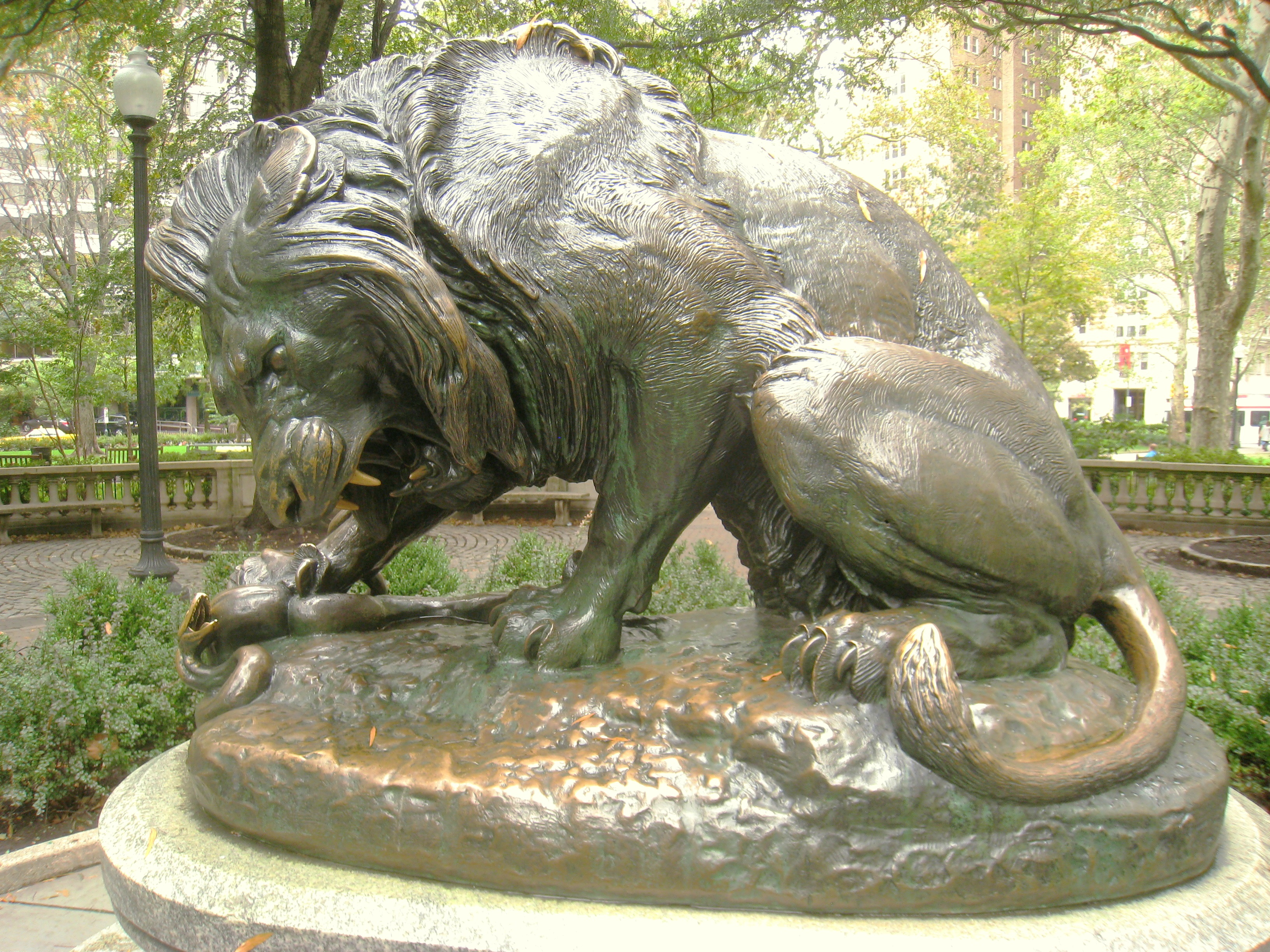
A bronze version of the statue in Rittenhouse Square in Philadelphia

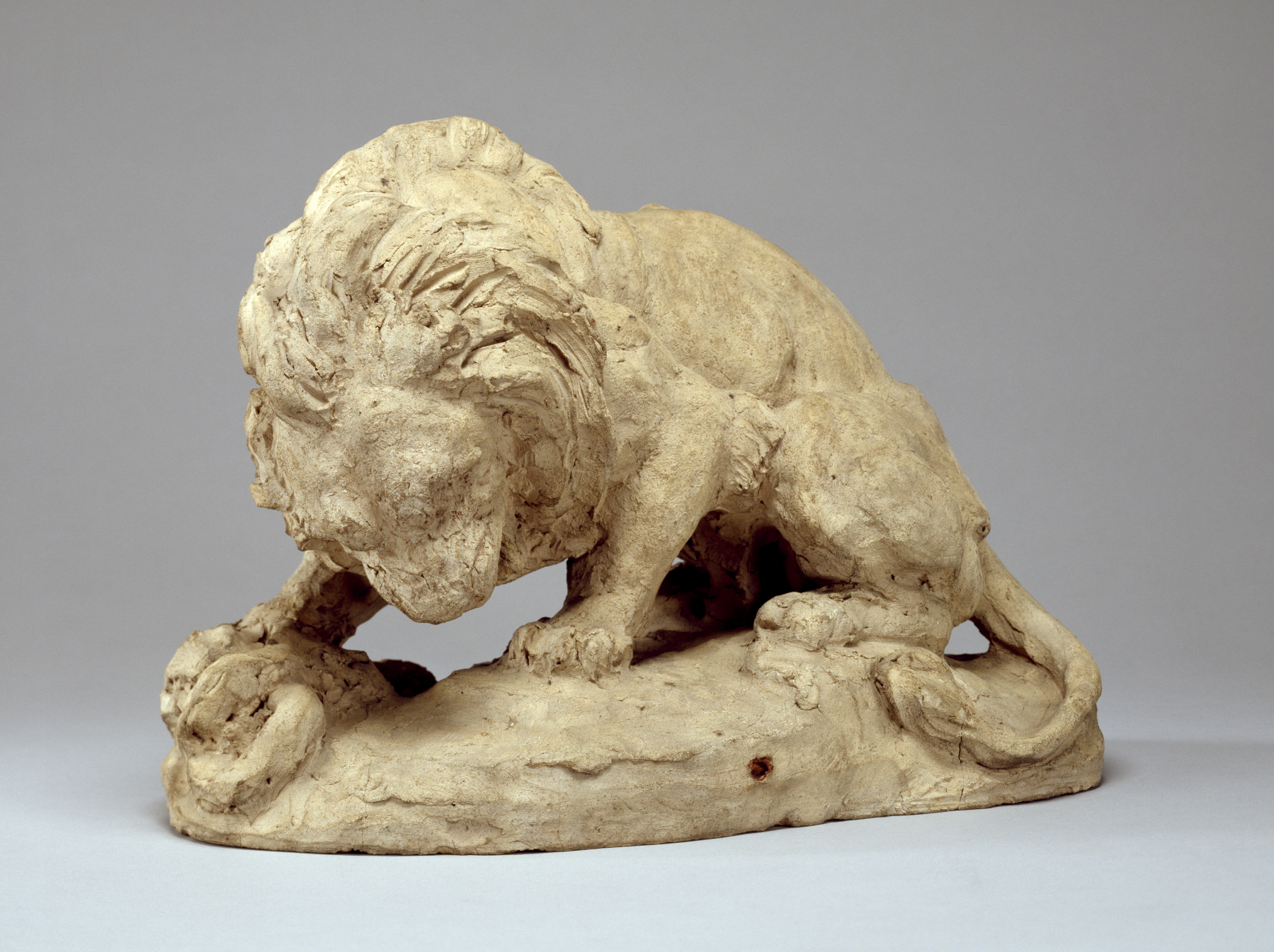
A sketch of the sculpture now at Walters Art Gallery in Baltimore

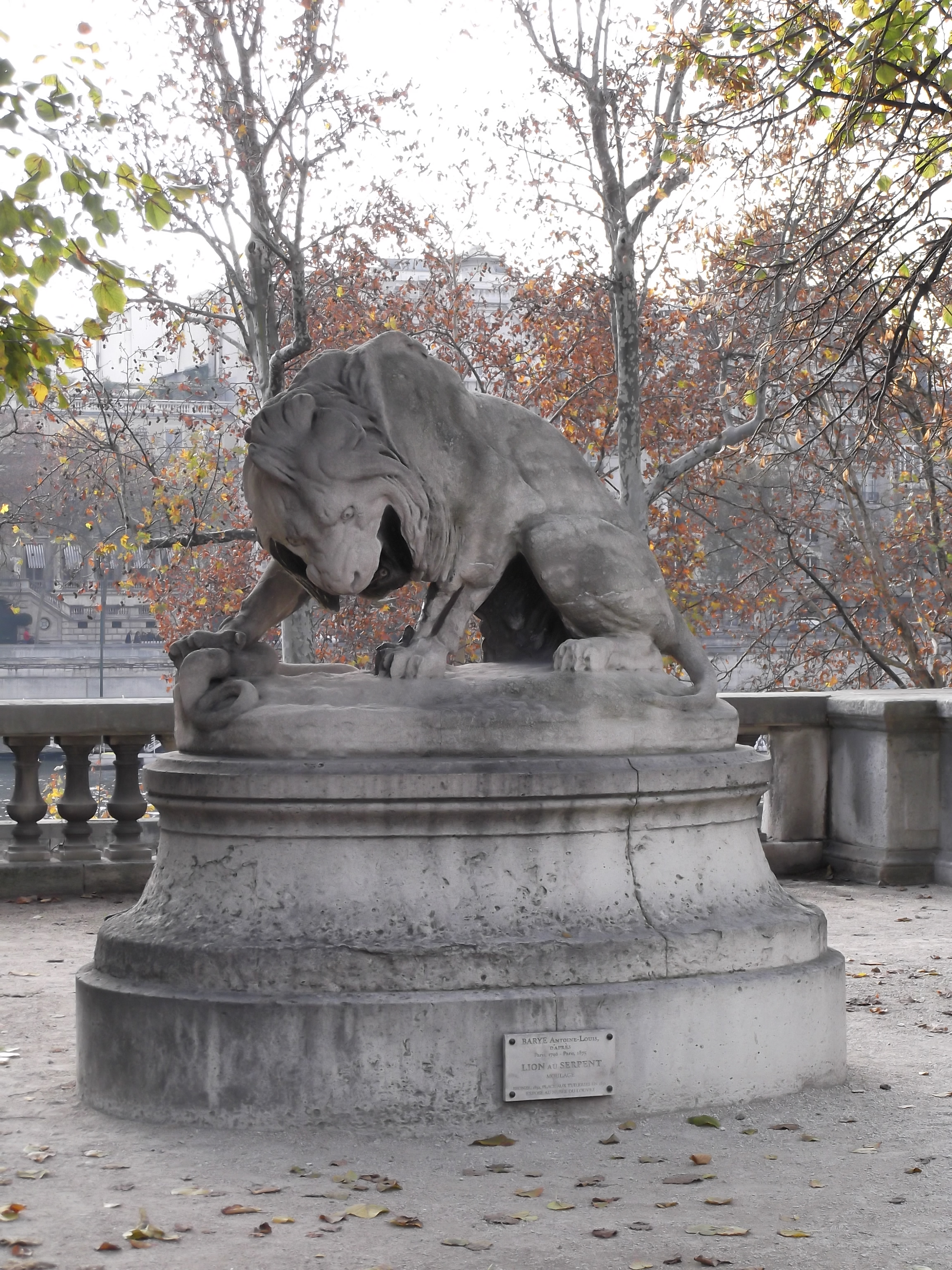
A stone version of the sculpture in Tuileries Palace

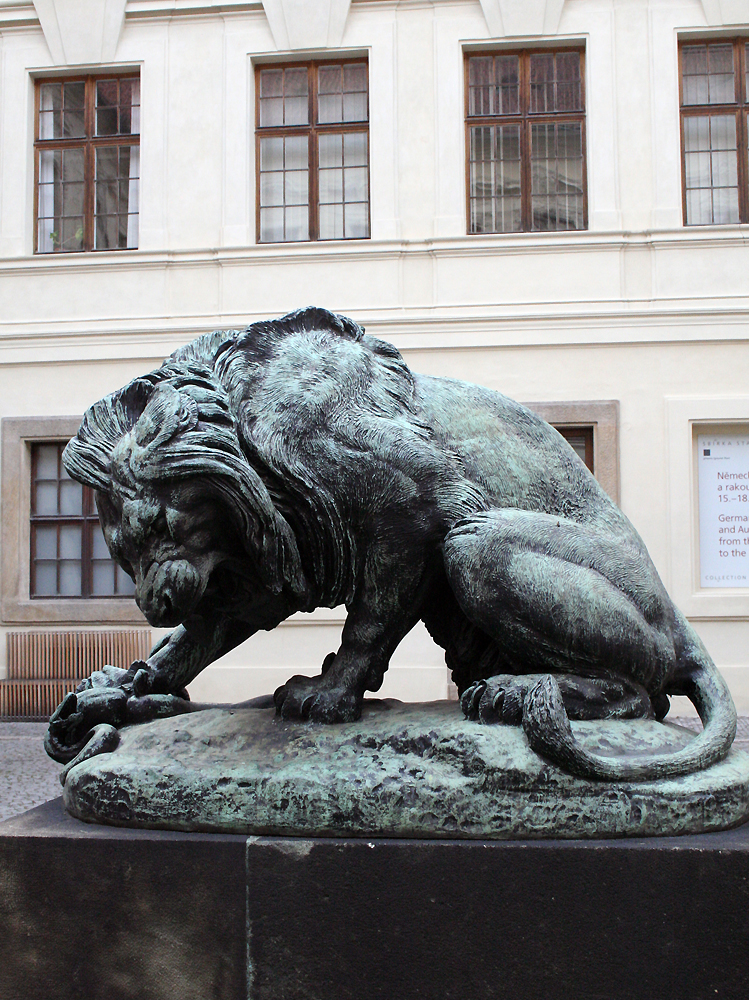
A bronze version of the statue now at the National Museum in Prague

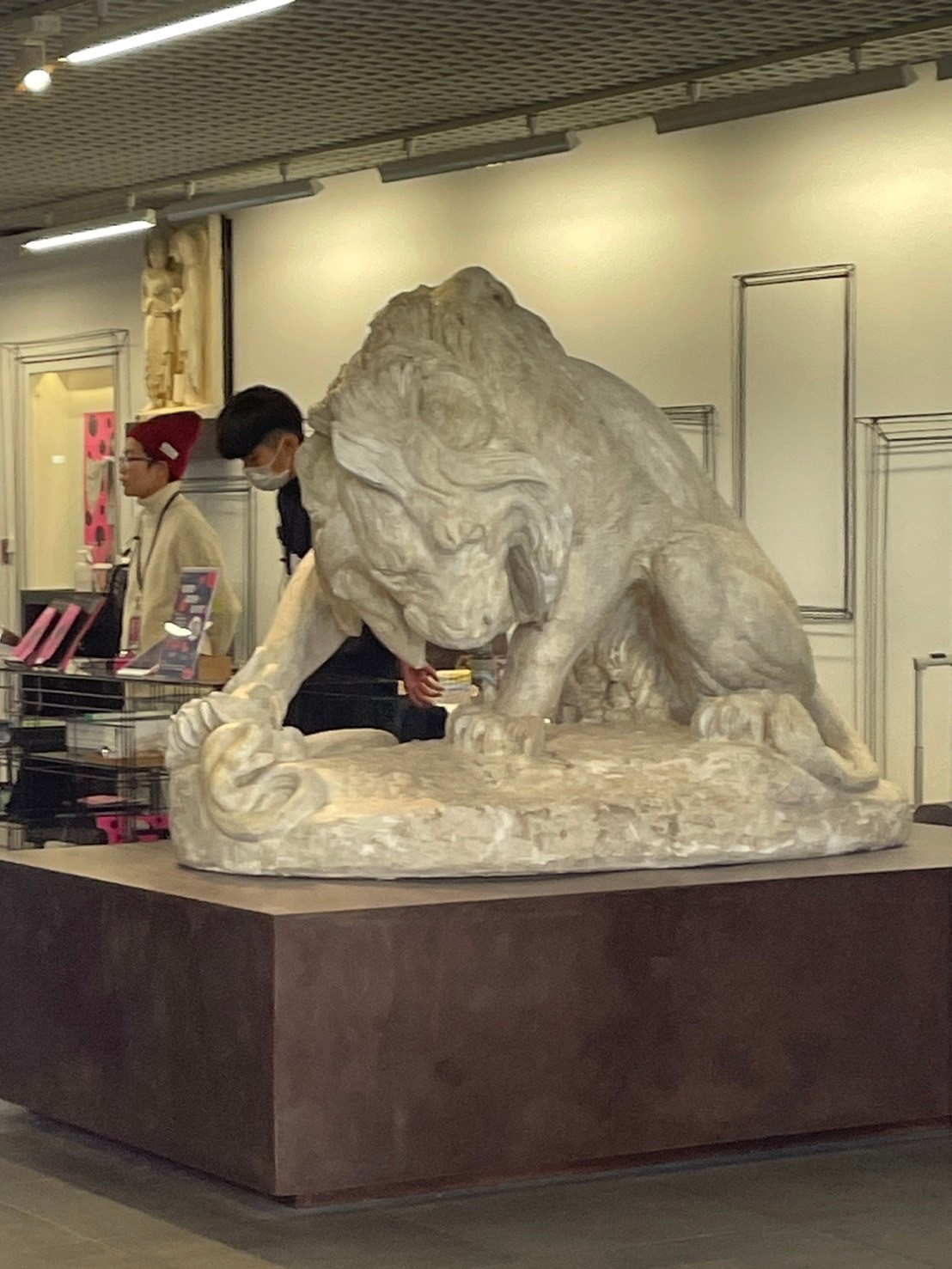
A plaster model version, located in the MoNTUE, greets visitors as the "Northern Lion."

Lion with a Snake is an 1832 sculpture by Antoine-Louis Barye. It measures 1.35 by 1.78 by 0.96 metres (4 ft 5 in × 5 ft 10 in × 3 ft 2 in).

== History ==
The original plaster, created in 1832, was exhibited at Salon in Paris and is in the Museum of Fine Arts of Lyon. It was cast in bronze using the lost-wax process in 1835 by Honoré Gonon}.

The original cast was acquired by Louis Philippe I. After being exhibited in the Tuileries Gardens from 1836 to 1911, it is now the Louvre. A stone version is located in the Tuileries.

Another bronze cast was made in 1891, and was the first bronze statue installed in Rittenhouse Square in Philadelphia the following year, where it is known as Lion Crushing a Serpent.
