= Golden Voice Oy =

Finnish media dubbing company

Golden Voice Oy was a Finnish dubbing/voice-over company that operated during the late '80s and '90s and dubbed several animations that were released on VHS and couple of them on Television. Their works have at various times been released by Octagon Invest, Sesam Video, Backlund & Co (Which is now known as Future Film). Golden Voice dubbed a large amount of both American and Japanese animations that were somewhat unconventional at the time, and though the level of their translation efforts were remarkably good the actual acting in their dubs has been heavily criticized.

The classic Golden Voice cast is sometimes referred to as "the Hopeanuoli cast" after their work on Ginga Nagareboshi Gin, by people and fans who don't necessarily know their names.

== Points of criticism ==
The company, was found by actor Pertti Nieminen in 1989. The company was located in the town of Vihti. Their first work is unknown, but especially in 1989 and 1990 the company did plenty of different cartoons and a couple of anime shows. Golden Voice has received principally mixed to negative opinions, mostly for the overall quality of the voice acting. Their work was reportedly at times affected by limited resources and rushed schedules and they originally had a limited cast of 3-4 actors but later managed to have 9 actors which helped them do their job more properly.

Despite these issues, the company still impressed major studios and the major Oy PVP Voice Ab contacted them to collaborate with them to dub Disney's DuckTales and this is widely considered to be their greatest efforts. The amount of actors was 5 during this time and all of them played both main characters and additional voices in every single episode dubbed. They also appeared in several other Disney films like The Jungle Book, The Aristocats and other projects helmed by Pekka Lehtosaari.

The most popular work they have made was the aforementioned Ginga Nagareboshi Gin which was dubbed in 1989, and the job was given by Backlund & Co (now Future Film).

After the companies founder Pertti Nieminen died in 2007, the company changed its profession to Consulting Services and is still named Golden Voice.

On this day now, the company has mixed opinions, like their follower Agapio Racing Team.

== Actors ==
The following voice-actors appeared in all or most of the cartoons dubbed by Golden Voice

- Pertti Nieminen
- Ulla Ollikainen
- Ilkka Moisio
- Erkki Murto
- Seppo Hietanen
- Päivi Sorsa
- Leena Margit Rautiainen
- Anna-Liisa Rikman
- Erkki Ollila
- Riitta Gustavsson

== Dubbed cartoons ==
- Heathcliff Finnish: Katti Matti
- Ginga: Nagareboshi Gin Finnish: Hopeanuoli
- Buttons & Rusty Finnish: Hoppu ja Ruska (Ulla Ollikainen dubbed all characters)
- Super Mario Bros. Super Show
- The Legend of Zelda
- The Care Bears Finnish: Halinallet
- Dennis the Menace Finnish: Ville Vallaton
- Camp Candy
- Captain N: The Game Master Finnish: Kapteeni N
- ALF: The Animated Series
- Maxie's World Finnish: Maxien maailma
- My Pet Monster Finnish: Lempi Monsteri
- The Smurfs Finnish: Smurffit - One of few dubs to have a Voice-over translation, with the exception of the songs (and the theme) remaining in Swedish as well.
- Dino-Riders
- Krazy Kat
- Cool McCool Finnish: Vili McViileri
- The Scooby-Doo Show
- My Little Pony
- Lady Lady!!
- Lady Lovely Locks
- Tiny Toon Adventures - One of few dubs to make it into television, on MTV3
- He-Man and the Masters of the Universe - Three VHS releases dubbed, other releases only had subtitles
- Jem and the Holograms
- Hägar the Horrible: Hägar Knows Best
- Zorro

The later My Little Pony VHS-releases, under Future Films, were redubbed by Agapio Racing Team.

== See also ==
- Agapio Racing Team
- Tuotantotalo Werne
