= Émile Guillemin =

French sculptor

- Born: Émile-Coriolan Hippolyte Guillemin; 16 October 1841; Paris, France
- Died: 1907 (aged 65–66); Paris, France
- Education: Émile Auguste Marie Guillemin, Jean-Jules Salmson
- Known for: Bronze sculpture
- Notable work: Le Guerrier arabe à cheval with Alfred Barye
- Movement: Orientalism
- Awards: Louvre Museum, 1897

Émile Coriolan Hippolyte Guillemin (French pronunciation: [emil ɡijmɛ̃]; 16 October 1841 – 1907) was a French sculptor of the Belle Époque. He worked in bronze. He studied under his father, the painter Auguste Guillemin, and under Jean-Jules Salmson. He showed work at the Salon of Paris from 1870 to 1899, and in 1897 received an honourable mention there. In 2008 his 1884 bronze sculpture Femme Kabyle d'Algerie and Janissaire du Sultan Mahmoud II (Kabyle woman from Algeria and Janissary of Sultan Mahmound II) sold for $1,202,500 plus auction fees in New York to a private collector through Sotheby's Auction House.

Some versions of his Cavalier Arabe are signed both by him and by Alfred Barye, suggesting a collaboration.

Emile Coriolan Hippolyte Guillemin made his debut in the Paris Salon of 1870 where he exhibited a pair of Roman Gladiators, Retaire and Mirmillon, drawn from antiquity. Guillemin specialized in figurative works and was greatly inspired by the Middle East and its exoticism. Representations of Indian falconers, Turkish maidens and Japanese courtesans firmly established Guillemin's reputation as an Orientalist sculptor from the mid-1870s.

== Links ==
- Animalier school

== Bibliography ==
- Pierre Kjellberg, Les Bronzes du XIXe Siècle, Paris, 1987, p. 369. ISBN 978-2-85917-422-4
