= The Golden Voice (2025 film) =

2025 drama film

- Theatrical release poster
- Directed by: Brandon Eric Kamin
- Written by: Brandon Eric Kamin
- Produced by: Brandon Eric Kamin; Robyn K. Bennett; J. Andrew Greenblatt
- Starring: Nick Nolte; Dharon Jones
- Cinematography: Justin Ervin
- Edited by: Cindy Parisotto
- Music by: Phil Mossman
- Distributed by: Vertical
- Release date: February 28, 2025
- Country: United States
- Language: English

The Golden Voice (previously titled Rittenhouse Square) is a 2025 American drama film written and directed by Brandon Eric Kamin, starring Nick Nolte and Dharon Jones. The movie shares the story of two people who remedy their dark times through friendship and music.

== Cast ==
- Nick Nolte as Barry
- Dharon Jones as KJ

== Production ==
The film was previously named Rittenhouse Square after Rittenhouse Square in Philadelphia, where filming occurred in October 2021.

== Release ==
The film had a work-in-progress screening at the 31st annual Philadelphia Film Festival. It was released on February 28, 2025.
