= List of sculptors =

This is a list of sculptors – notable people known for three-dimensional artistic creations, which may include those who use sound and light. It is incomplete and you can help by expanding it.

== A ==
- Wäinö Aaltonen (1894–1966), Finland
- Johannes Josephus Aarts (1871–1934), Netherlands
- Magdalena Abakanowicz (1930–2017), Poland
- Elfriede Abbe (1919–2012), US
- Louise Abbéma (1853–1927), France
- Abed Abdi (عبد عابدي, born 1942), Palestine/Israel
- Pablita Abeyta (1953–2017), US
- Antonio Abondio (1538–1591), Italy
- Per Abramsen (1941–2018), Netherlands
- Julio Abril (1911–1979), Colombia
- Jane Ackroyd (born 1957), England
- József Ács (1931–2023), Hungary
- Lambert-Sigisbert Adam (1700–1759), France
- Nicolas-Sébastien Adam (1705–1778), France
- Alice Adams (born 1930), US
- George Gammon Adams (1821–1898), England
- Amandus Adamson (1855–1929), Estonia
- Yaacov Agam (יעקב אגם, born 1928), Palestine/Israel
- Agasias, son of Dositheus (4th century BC), Ephesus
- Peter Agostini (1913–1993), US
- Agostino di Duccio (1418 – c. 1481), Italy
- Agostino da Siena (c. 1285 – c. 1347), Italy
- Gian Francesco d'Agrate (1489 – post-1563), Italy
- Armen Agop (born 1968), Egypt
- Amber Aguirre (born 1958), US
- Pauline Aitken (1893–1958), England
- Kinji Akagawa (born 1940), Japan/US
- Benjamin Paul Akers (1825–1861), US
- Latcholassie Akesuk (1919–2000), Canada
- Manasie Akpaliapik (born 1955), Canada
- Aleijadinho–Antonio Francisco Lisboa (1730 or 1738–1814), Brazil
- Diana al-Hadid (born 1981), Syria
- Leon Battista Alberti (1404–1472), Italy
- Lita Albuquerque, US
- Andrea Aleksi (1425–1505), Venetian Dalmatia
- Alessandro Algardi (1595–1654), Italy
- Aljoscha–Oleksii Potupin (born 1974), Ukraine
- Christophe-Gabriel Allegrain (1710–1795), France
- Tina Allen (1949–2008), US
- Nels N. Alling (1861–1955), Denmark/US
- Edward Allington (1951–2017), England
- Walter Allward (1876–1955), Canada
- Nir Alon (ניר אלון, born 1964), Israel
- Ahmed Al Safi (احمد الصافي, born 1971), Iraq
- Toomas Altnurme (born 1973), Estonia
- Giovanni Antonio Amadeo (c. 1447–1522), Italy
- Simeonie Amagoalik (1933–2011), Canada
- Edmond Amateis (1897–1981), Italy/US
- Louis Amateis (1855–1913), Italy/US
- Woody van Amen (born 1936), Netherlands
- Sarah Fisher Ames (1817–1901), US
- Aisa Amittu (born 1951), Canada
- Bartolomeo Ammanati (1511–1592), Italy
- Grimanesa Amorós (born 1962), Peru/US
- Eric Adjetey Anang (born 1985), Ghana
- Ruth Hutton Ancker (1901–1979), US
- John De Andrea (born 1941), US
- Constantine Andreou (1917–2007), Greece
- Neale Andrew (born 1958), England
- Mari Andriessen (1897–1979), Netherlands
- Androbulus , sculptor of classical antiquity
- Beatrice Angle (1859–1915), England
- François and Michel Anguier (c. 1604–1669 and 1613–1686), France
- Irene Kataq Angutitok (1914–1971), Canada
- Alashua Aningmiuq (1914–1972), Canada
- Norah Ansell (1906–1990), England
- Károly Antal (1909–1994), Hungary
- Benedetto Antelami (c. 1150 – c. 1230), Italy
- Horst Antes (born 1936), Germany
- Mark Antokolski (1843–1902), Russia
- Stephen Antonakos (1926–2013), Greece/US
- Janine Antoni (born 1964), US
- Karel Appel (1921–2006), Netherlands
- John Wormald Appleyard (1832–1894), England
- Silvio Apponyi (born 1949), Australia
- Isa Paddy Aqiattusuk (1898–1954), Canada
- Rachel Ara (born 1965), England
- Michael Dan Archer (born 1955), Scotland
- Alexander Archipenko (1887–1964), Ukraine/US
- Lucien den Arend (born 1943), Netherlands
- Giosuè Argenti (1819–1901), Italy
- Armando (1929–2018), Netherlands
- John Armleder (born 1948), Switzerland
- Hazel Armour (1894–1985), Scotland
- Henry Hugh Armstead (1828–1905), England
- Benita Armstrong (1907–2004), England
- Walter S. Arnold (born 1953), US
- Jean Arp (1886–1966), Germany/France
- Egid Quirin Asam (1692–1750), Germany
- Ruth Asawa (1926–2013), US
- David Ascalon (מוריס אשקלון, born 1945), Israel
- Maurice Ascalon (1913–2003, מוריס אשקלון), Palestine/Israel
- Pamela Ascherson (1923–2010), England
- Karoo Ashevak (1940–1974), Canada
- Kiugak Ashoona (1933–2014), Canada
- Ásmundur Sveinsson (1893–1982), Iceland
- Tiziano Aspetti (c. 1557/1559–1606), Italy
- Evelin Winifred Aston (1891–1975), England
- Karel Aubroeck (1894–1986), Belgium
- Mary Audsley (1919–2008), England
- Hezekiah Augur (1791–1858), US
- Antun Augustinčić (1900–1979), Yugoslavia
- Alice Aycock (born 1946), US
- Nehemia Azaz (1923–2008), Israel
- Giovanni Bernardino Azzolini or Mazzolini (c. 1572 – c. 1645), Italy

== B ==
- Nina Baanders-Kessler (1915–2002), Netherlands
- John Bacon (1740–1799), England
- John Bacon the Younger (1777–1859), England
- Frances Bagley (born 1946), US
- Edward Hodges Baily (1788–1867), England
- Robert Bain (1911–1973), Scotland/South Africa
- Neil Lawson Baker (1938–2022), England
- Vojin Bakić (1915–1992), Yugoslavia
- Gijs Bakker (born 1942), Netherlands
- César Baldaccini (1921–1998), France
- Joost Baljeu (1925–1991), Netherlands
- Caroline Peddle Ball (1869–1938), US
- Percival Ball (1845–1900), England/Australia
- Thomas Ball (1819–1911), US
- Baccio Bandinelli (1493–1560), Italy
- Thomas Banks (1735–1808), England
- Fiona Banner (born 1966), England
- Frida Baranek (born 1961), Brazil
- Ernst Barlach (1870–1938), Germany
- Oliver L. Barrett (1892–1943), US
- Bill Barrett (born 1934), US
- Louis-Ernest Barrias (1841–1905), France
- Artur Barrio (born 1945), Brazil
- Richmond Barthé (1901 – c. 1990), US
- Frédéric Bartholdi (1834–1904), France
- Lorenzo Bartolini (1777–1850), Italy
- Cincinnato Baruzzi (1796–1878), Italy
- Alfred Barye (1839–1882), France
- Antoine-Louis Barye (1796–1875), France
- Earl W. Bascom (1906–1995), US
- Georg Baselitz (1938–2026), Germany
- Marie Bashkirtseff (1860–1884), Ukraine/France
- Leonard Baskin (1922–2000), US
- Harry Bates (1850–1899), England
- Edith Bateson (1867–1938), England
- Terry Batt (born 1949), Australia
- John Nelson Battenberg (1931–2012), US
- Jay Battle (born 1966), Canada/England
- Armin Baumgarten (born 1967), Germany
- Jean Baptiste Joseph De Bay père (1779–1863), Belgium
- Emilia Bayer (born 1934), Bulgaria
- Gilbert Bayes (1872–1953), England
- Marysole Wörner Baz (1936–2014), Mexico
- Robert Beall (1836–1892), England
- Reginald E. Beauchamp (1910–2000), US
- Hanneke Beaumont (born 1947), Netherlands/Belgium
- André Beauneveu (1335–1400), Southern Netherlands
- Károly Bebo (c. 1712–1779), Hungary
- András Beck (1911–1985), Hungary
- Fülöp Ö. Beck (1873–1945), Hungary
- Vanessa Beecroft (born 1969), Italy/US
- Vladimir Beklemishev (1861–1919), Russia/Ukraine
- Zdzisław Beksiński (1929–2005), Poland
- Edith Anna Bell (1870–1929), Ireland
- John Bell (1811–1895), England
- Larry Bell (born 1939), US
- Hans Bellmer (1902–1975), Germany
- Fons Bemelmans (born 1938), Netherlands
- Carolina Benedicks-Bruce (1856–1935), Sweden
- Giacomo Benevelli (1925–2011), Italy
- Manfredi Beninati (born 1970), Italy
- Lynda Benglis (born 1941), US
- Eva Benson (1875–1949), Australia
- István (Etienne) Beöthy (1897–1961), Hungary/France
- Lajos Berán (1882–1943), Hungary
- Guri Berg (born 1963), Norway
- Edward Berge (1876–1924), US
- Boris van Berkum (born 1968), Netherlands
- Tony Berlant (born 1941), US
- Lía Bermúdez (1930–2021), Venezuela
- Gian Lorenzo Bernini (1598–1680), Italy
- Miguel Berrocal (1933–2006), Spain
- Treffle Berthlaume (1803–1884), Canada
- Antonio Berti (1904–1990), Italy
- Claude Bertin (died 1705), France
- Robert Bery (born 1953), US
- László Beszédes (1874–1922), Hungary
- Aloïs de Beule (1861–1935), Belgium
- Joseph Beuys (1921–1986), Germany
- Robert of Beverley (pre-1240–1285), England
- Gyula Bezerédi (1858–1925), Hungary
- Lujo Bezeredi (1898–1979), Hungary/Yugoslavia (Croatia)
- Huma Bhabha (born 1962, هوما بهابها), Pakistan
- Bholekar Srihari (1941–2018), India
- Joyce Bidder (1906–1999), United Kingdom
- Adolf Bierbrauer (1915–2012), Germany
- Helen Biggar (1909–1953), Scotland
- Electra Waggoner Biggs (1912–2001), US
- Camille Billops (1933–2019), US
- Ginette Bingguely-Lejeune (1895–1969), France
- George Edwin Bissell (1839–1920), US
- Herman Wilhelm Bissen (1798–1868), Denmark
- Vilhelm Bissen (1836–1913), Denmark
- Douglas Robertson Bisset (1908–2000), Scotland
- Leonardo Bistolfi (1859–1933), Italy
- Karl Bitter (1867–1915), Austria/US
- Ronald Bladen, (1918–1988), US
- Marguerite Louis Blasingame (1906–1947), US
- William Bloye (1890–1975), England
- Peter Blume (1906–1992), US
- Umberto Boccioni (1882–1916), Italy
- Edward Marshall Boehm (1913–1969), US
- Joseph Edgar Boehm (1834–1890), Austrian/British
- René de Boer (born 1945), Netherlands
- Marinus Boezem (born 1934), Netherlands
- Laurent Boillat (1911–1985), Switzerland
- Paul Du Bois (1859–1938), Belgium
- Gerrit Bolhuis (1907–1975), Netherlands
- Michael Bolus (1934–2013), South Africa
- Pier Jacopo Alari Bonacolsi (c. 1460–1528), Italy
- Henri Boncquet (1868–1908), Belgium
- Phyllis Bone (1894–1972), Scotland
- Isidore Bonheur (1827–1901), France
- Rosa Bonheur (1822–1899), France
- Joseph Bonomi the Younger (1796–1878), England
- Lee Bontecou (1931–2022), US
- David Booker (born 1954), Australia
- Margaret Boozer (born 1966), US
- Juan Bordes (born 1948), Spain
- Gutzon Borglum (1867–1941), US
- Vasyl Borodai (1917–2010), Ukraine
- Michael Boroniec (born 1983), US
- Miklós Borsos (1906–1990), Hungary
- Jenő Bory (1879–1959), Hungary
- Loek Bos (born 1946), Netherlands
- Madeleine Boschan (born 1979), Germany
- François Joseph Bosio (1769–1845), France
- Orfeo Boselli (1597–1667), Italy
- Ervin Bossányi (1891–1975), Hungary/England
- Ángel Botello (1913–1986), Spain/Puerto Rico
- Fernando Botero (1932–2023), Colombia
- Antoine Bourdelle (1861–1929), France
- Antoine-Félix Bouré (1831–1883), Belgium
- Louise Bourgeois (1911–2010), France/US
- Hans Van de Bovenkamp (born 1938), Netherlands/US
- John Boxtel (1930–2022), Netherlands/Canada
- Mary Syme Boyd (1910–1997), Scotland
- Jimmy Boyle (born 1944), Scotland
- Mark Boyle (1934–2005), Scotland
- Judy Boyt (born 1954), England
- Constantin Brâncuși (1876–1957), Romania
- Peter Brandes (born 1944), Denmark
- Eugène Brands (1913–2002), Netherlands
- Roger Bracke (1913–1993), Belgium
- Georges Braque (1882–1963), France
- Arnold Franz Brasz (1888–1966), US
- Victor Brauner (1903–1966), Romania
- Arno Breker (1900–1991), Germany
- Art Brenner (1924–2013), US/France
- John Bridgeman (1916–2004), England
- Thomas Brock (1847–1922), England
- Laurence Broderick (born 1935), England
- William Brodie (1815–1881), Scotland
- Clemens van den Broeck (born 1943), Netherlands
- Caroline Shawk Brooks (1840–1913), US
- Judith Brown (1931–1992), US
- Mortimer Brown (1874–1966), England
- Sean K. L. Browne (born 1953), US
- Steve Brudniak (born 1961), US
- Coosje van Bruggen (1942–2009), Netherlands/US
- Filippo Brunelleschi (1377–1446), Italy
- Christoph Brüx (born 1965), Germany
- Berlinde De Bruyckere (born 1964), Belgium
- Robert Bryden (1865–1939), Scotland
- Serhii Brylov (born 1974), Ukraine
- Teodozia Bryzh (1929–1999), Ukraine
- Emilie Benes Brzezinski (1932–2022), US
- Jérôme Btesh (born 1968), France
- James George Bubb (1781–1853), England
- Caspar Buberl (1834–1899), US
- Heidi Bucher (1926–1993), Switzerland
- John Buckley (born 1945), England
- Rembrandt Bugatti (1884–1916), Italy
- Jan van Borssum Buisman (1919–2012), Netherlands
- Fritz Bultman (1919–1985), US
- Mark Bulwinkle (born 1946), US
- Michelangelo Buonarroti (1475–1564), Italy
- Jacob Burck (1907–1982), Poland/US
- Alberto Burri (1915–1995), Italy
- Andrew Burton (born 1961), England
- Scott Burton (1939–1989), US
- Dirk Bus (1907–1978), Netherlands
- James Butler (1931–2022), England

== C ==
- Claude Cahun (1894–1954), France
- Alexander Calder (1898–1976), US
- Alexander Milne Calder (1845–1923), Scotland/US
- Alexander Stirling Calder (1870–1945), US
- Florence Callcott (1866–1938), England
- Mary Callery (1903–1977), US
- Arnolfo di Cambio (c. 1240 – c. 1300/1310), Italy
- Estella Campavias (1918–1990), Turkey/England
- Thomas Campbell (1790–1858), Scotland/England
- Dhimiter Çani (1904–1990), Ottoman Empire/Albania
- Antonio Canova (1757–1822), Italy
- Manuel Carbonell (1918–2011), Cuba/US
- Agustin Cárdenas (1927–2001), Cuba/France
- Ludovico Cardi (alias Cigoli, 1559–1613), Italy
- John Edward Carew (1785–1868), Ireland
- Anne Marie Carl-Nielsen (1863–1945), Denmark
- Norman Carlberg (1928–2018), US
- Nancy Carline (1909–2004), England
- Agostino Carlini (1718–1790), Italy/England
- Anthony Caro (1924–2013), England
- Kevin Caron (born 1960), US
- Jean-Baptiste Carpeaux (1827–1875), France
- Diane Carr (born 1946), US
- Pierre Cartellier (1757–1831), France
- Granville Carter (1920–1992), US
- Hilary Cartmel (born 1958), England
- Louis-Albert Carvin (1875–1951), France
- Samuel Cashwan (1900–1988), US
- Felice Casorati (1883–1963), Italy
- Niclas Castello (born 1984), Germany
- Franco Castelluccio (born 1955), US
- Machado de Castro (1731–1822), Portugal
- Elizabeth Catlett (1915–2012), US/Mexico
- Bartolomeo Cavaceppi (c. 1716–1799), Italy
- Agim Çavdarbasha (1944–1999), Yugoslavia/Kosovo
- Joseph Hermon Cawthra (1886–1971), England
- Marie Cazin (1844–1924), France
- John Cederquist (born 1946), US
- Benvenuto Cellini (1500–1571), Italy
- Vija Celmins (born 1938), Latvia/US
- Joseph Chaikov (1888–1979), Russia/Ukraine
- Yannoulis Chalepas (1851–1938), Greece
- Rene Paul Chambellan (1893–1955), US
- John Chamberlain (1927–2011), US
- Elisabeth Gordon Chandler (1913–2006), US
- Gordon Chandler (born 1953), US
- Sir Francis Legatt Chantrey (1781–1841), England
- Cornelia Van Auken Chapin (1893–1973), US
- Alice Chaplin (1848–1921), England
- Christine Charlesworth (born 1949), England
- Guillaume Charlier (1854–1925), Belgium
- Heinrich Charrasky (1656–1710), Hungary/Germany
- Doris Totten Chase (1923–2008), US
- Antoine-Denis Chaudet (1763–1810), France
- Sir Henry Cheere (1703–1781), England
- John Cheere (1709–1787), England
- Michael Chemiakin (1908–1970), Russia/Soviet Union
- Judy Chicago (born 1949), US
- Eduardo Chillida (1924–2002), Spain
- Joseph Chinard (1756–1813), France
- Saloua Raouda Choucair (1916–2017), Lebanon
- Fanny Lam Christie (born 1952), Hong Kong/Scotland
- Anna Chromý (1940–2021), Czechoslovakia/France
- Chryssa (1933–2013), Greece/US
- Emilius R. Ciampa (1896–1996), US
- Caius Gabriel Cibber (1630–1700), Denmark
- Eugen Ciuca (1913–2005), Romania/US
- John Clague (1928–2004), US
- Thomas J. Clapperton (1879–1962), Scotland
- Lygia Clark (1920–1988), Brazil
- Camille Claudel (1864–1943), France
- Francesco Clemente (born 1952), Italy/US
- Claude Michel (alias Clodion, 1738–1814), France
- Shelagh Cluett (1947–2007), England
- Helen Mary Coaton (1911–2005), England
- Juan Fernando Cobo (born 1959), Colombia
- Jon Coffelt (born 1963), US
- Mirit Cohen (1945–1990), Israel/US
- Nessa Cohen (1885–1976), US
- Ola Cohn (1892–1964), Australia
- Claire Colinet (1892–1964), Belgium
- Elisabeth Collins (1904–2000), England
- Marie-Anne Collot (1748–1821), France
- Jacopo Colonna (died 1540), Italy
- Marta Colvin (1907–1995), Chile
- Robert Combas (born 1957), France
- John Connell (1940–2009), US
- Angela Conner (born 1935), England
- Carl Conrads (1839–1920), Germany/US
- Constant (1920–2005), Netherlands
- Rey Paz Contreras (1950–2021), Philippines
- John S. Conway (1852–1925), US
- Ellen Rankin Copp (1853–1901), US
- Sioban Coppinger (born 1955), England
- Christian Cardell Corbet (born 1966), Canada
- Christine Corday (born 1970), US
- Kate Cory (1861–1958), US
- Guillaume Coustou the Elder (1677–1746), France
- Guillaume Coustou the Younger (1716–1777), France
- Nicolas Coustou (1658–1733), France
- Phil Coy (born 1971), England
- Petah Coyne (born 1953), US
- Antoine Coysevox (1640–1720), France
- Tony Cragg (born 1949), England
- Doris Crane (1911–1999), England
- Meg Cranston (born 1960), US
- José de Creeft (1884–1982), Spain/US
- Benjamin Creswick (1853–1946), England
- Stella Rebecca Crofts (1898–1964), England
- Dorothy Cross (born 1956), Ireland
- Joseph Csaky (1888–1971), Hungary
- Marianne Csaky (born 1959), Hungary
- Ferenc Csentery (1937–2014), Hungary
- José Álvarez Cubero (1768–1827), Spain
- Beth Cullen-Kerridge (born 1970), England
- Fern Cunningham (1949–2020), US
- Cornelius Cure (died 1607), England
- Ella Rose Curtois (1860–1944), England
- João Cutileiro (1937–2021), Portugal
- Léonard De Cuyper (1813–1870), Belgium
- Boleslaw Cybis (1895–1957), Poland

== D ==
- Anna Dabis (1847–1927), Germany
- Greta Dale (1929–1978), Canada
- Mario Dal Fabbro (1913–1990), Italy, US
- Cyrus Dallin (1861–1944), US
- Giovanni Dalmata (Ivan Duknović, c. 1440 – c. 1514), Dalmatia/Italy
- Jules Dalou (1838–1902), France
- Brian D'Amato (born 1962), US
- Anne Seymour Damer (1749–1828), England
- Dietmar Damerau (1935–2011), Germany
- David d'Angers (1788–1856), France
- Joan Danziger (born 1934) US
- Nassos Daphnis (1914–2010), US
- Frances Darlington (1880–1940), England
- Charles Daudelin (1920–2001), Canada
- Honoré Daumier (1808–1879), France
- Grenville Davey (born 1961), England
- Lea Davidova-Medene (1921–1986), Latvia
- Anne Davidson (1937–2008), Scotland
- Eleanor Layfield Davis (1911–1985), US
- Emma Lu Davis (1905–1988), US
- Paul Day (born 1967), England
- De Onbekende Beeldhouwer (The Anonymous Sculptor, fl. 1980s onwards), Netherlands
- Richard Deacon (born 1949), Wales/England
- Frans Deckers (1835–1916), Belgium
- Edgar Degas (1834–1917), France
- Charles Degeorge (1837–1888), France
- Ettore DeGrazia (1909–1982), US
- Francisco de la Dehesa (17th century), Spain
- Dorothy Dehner (1901–1994), US
- Paul-Édouard Delabrièrre (1829–1912), France
- Jennie Delahunt (1877–1954), England
- Santiago Martínez Delgado (1905–1984), Colombia
- Laurent Delvaux (1695–1778), Southern Netherlands
- Christabel Dennison (1884–1924), England
- Fortunato Depero (1892–1960), Italy
- André Derain (1880–1954), France
- Albert Desenfans (1845–1938), Belgium
- Martin Desjardins (1637–1694), Flanders/France
- Charles Despiau (1874–1946), France
- Alexander Deyneka (1899–1969), Soviet Union
- William Reid Dick (1879–1961), Scotland
- Adriaan Diedericks (born 1990), South Africa
- Peter Van Dievoet (1661–1729), Spanish Netherlands
- Lesley Dill (born 1950), US
- Julien Dillens (1849–1904), Belgium
- Maria Lvovna Dillon (1858–1932), Russia
- Sepy Dobronyi (1922–1910), Hungary/US
- Eugène Dodeigne (1923–2015), France
- Donatello (1386–1466), Italy
- Gyula Donáth (1850–1909), Hungary
- Michele Oka Doner (born 1945), US
- Carlos Dorrien (born 1948), Argentina
- Alceo Dossena (1878–1937), Italy
- Violet Dreschfeld (1890–1975), England
- Dr Gindi (born 1965), Switzerland
- Orshi Drozdik (born 1946), Hungary
- Alfred Drury (1856–1944), England
- Raymond Duchamp-Villon (1876–1918), France
- Paul Dubois (1829–1905), France
- Alfred Dubucand (1828–1894), France
- Jean Dubuffet (1901–1985), France
- Agostino di Duccio (1418–1481), Italy
- Raymond Duchamp-Villon (1876–1918), France
- Antony Dufort (born 1948), England
- Karl Duldig (1902–1986), Austria-Australia
- Augustin-Alexandre Dumont (1801–1884), France
- Edme Dumont (1720–1775), France
- François Dumont (sculptor) (1688–1726), France
- Jacques-Edme Dumont (1761–1844), France
- Pierre Dumont (sculptor) (born 1650), France
- Denis Dunlop (1892–1959), England
- Susan Durant (1827–1873), England
- François-Joseph Duret (1732–1816), France
- Dušan Džamonja (1928–2009), Yugoslavia/Croatia
- Czesław Dźwigaj (born 1950), Poland

== E ==
- Thomas Eakins (1844–1916), US
- Anthony Earnshaw (1924–2001), England
- Abastenia St. Leger Eberle (1878–1942) US
- Jon Edgar (born 1968), England
- Ursula Edgcumbe (1900–1985), England
- Melvin Edwards (1937–2026), US
- Nicole Eisenman (born 1965), US
- Dale Eldred (1933–1993), US
- Tracey Emin (born 1963), England
- Lin Emery (1926–2021), US
- Ennutsiak (1896–1967), Canada
- Ben Enwonwu (1917–1994), Nigeria
- Jacob Epstein (1880–1959), US/England
- Francis de Erdely (1904–1959), Hungary/US
- Sven Erixson (1899–1970), Sweden
- Max Ernst (1891–1976), Germany
- Robert Erskine (born 1954), England
- Marisol Escobar (1930–2016), France/US
- Helen Escobedo (1934–2010), Mexico
- Lucassie Etungat (1951 – c. 2016), Canada
- Cerith Wyn Evans (born 1958), Wales
- Roberta Everett (1906–1979), England
- Philip Evergood (1901–1971), US
- Epiphanius Evesham (1570–1634), England

== F ==
- Agenore Fabbri (1911–1998), Italy
- Jan Fabre (born 1958), Belgium
- János Fadrusz (1858–1903), Hungary
- Michael Fairfax (born 1953), England
- Akin (Akinlabi) Fakeye (born 1936), Nigeria
- Azeez Kayode Fakeye (born 1965), Nigeria
- Lukman Alade Fakeye (born 1983), Nigeria
- Étienne Maurice Falconet (1716–1791), France
- Alexandre Falguière (1831–1900), France
- August Falise (1875–1936), Netherlands
- Claire Falkenstein (1908–1997), US
- Abigail Fallis (born 1968), England
- Farid Mansour (1929–2010, فريد منصور), Lebanon
- Bernd Fasching (born 1955), Austria
- André Fauteux (born 1946), Canada
- Jean Fautrier (1898–1964), France
- William Fawke (1948–2018), England
- Bita Fayyazi (born 1962, بیتا فیاضی), Iran
- Henry Charles Fehr (1867–1940), England
- Rachel Feinstein (born 1971, US
- Albert Féraud (1921–2008), France
- Béni Ferenczy (1890–1967), Hungary
- István Ferenczy (1792–1856), Hungary
- Helaman Ferguson (born 1940), US
- Ken Ferguson (1928–2005), US
- John Duncan Fergusson (1874–1961), Scotland
- Teresita Fernández (born 1968), US
- Jackie Ferrara (born 1929), US
- Helene Fesenmaier (1937–2013), US
- Carole Feuerman (born 1945), US
- Thomas Feuerstein (born 1968), Austria
- Steve Field (born 1954), England
- Ailene Fields (born 1948), US
- Mino da Fiesole (c. 1429–1484), Italy
- Parys Filippi (1836–1874), Poland/Ukraine
- Alexander Finta (1881–1958), Hungary/US
- Adriano Fiorentino (1440–1499), Italy
- Steve Fiorilla (1961–2009), US
- Gladys Caldwell Fisher (1907–1952), US
- Audrey Flack (born 1941), US
- John Flaxman (1755–1826), England
- Sylvie Fleury (born 1961), Switzerland
- Sándor Fodor (born 1954), Hungary
- Robert Fogell (born 1963), England
- Giovanni Battista Foggini (1652–1725), Italy
- John Henry Foley (1818–1874), Ireland
- Margaret Foley (1827–1877), US
- Lucio Fontana (1899–1968), Argentina
- Peter Forakis (1927–2009), US
- Edward Onslow Ford (1852–1901), England
- Laura Ford (born 1961), Wales
- Agnes Freda Forres (1881–1942), England
- Alina Forsman (1845–1899), Finland
- Sairi Forsman (born 1964), Mexico
- Remco de Fouw (born 1962), Ireland
- Elsa Fraenkel (1892–1975), Germany/England
- Alexandre-Évariste Fragonard (1780–1850), France
- Maria Fragoudaki (born 1983), Greece
- George Frampton (1860–1928), England
- Ruth Francken (1924–2006), Czechoslovakia/France
- André François (1915–2005), Hungary/France
- Robert Frangeš-Mihanović (1872–1940), Austria-Hungary/Yugoslavia
- Hannah Frank (1908–2008), Scotland
- Jane Frank (1918–1986), US
- Mary Frank (born 1933), England
- Manuel Franquelo (born c. 1950), Spain
- James Earle Fraser (1876–1953), US
- Laura Gardin Fraser (1889–1966), US
- Edward J. Fraughton (born 1939), US
- John Frazee (1790–1852), US
- Wilhelm Freddie (1909–1995), Denmark
- Marshall Fredericks (1908–1998), US
- Charles-Auguste Fraikin (1817–1893), Belgium
- Emmanuel Frémiet (1824–1910), France
- Daniel Chester French (1850–1931), US
- Tom Friedman (born 1965), US
- Elisabeth Frink (1930–1993), England
- Harriet Whitney Frishmuth (1880–1980), US
- Gerda Frömel (1931–1975), Ireland
- Zenos Frudakis (born 1951), US
- Emil Fuchs (1866–1929), Austria/US
- Nick Fudge (born 1960), England
- Meta Vaux Warrick Fuller (1877–1968), US
- Victoria Fuller (born 1953), US
- Hortensia Fussy (born 1954), Austria

== G ==
- Naum Gabo (1890–1977), Russia/Soviet Union
- Edith Mabel Gabriel (1882–1972), England
- György Galántai (born 1941), Hungary
- Anya Gallaccio (born 1963), Scotland/England
- Valentin Galochkin (1928–2006), Ukraine/Soviet union
- Jens Galschiøt (born 1954), Denmark
- Neeraj Gupta (born 1969), India
- Byron Galvez (1941–2009), Mexico
- Henry Snell Gamley (1865–1928), Scotland
- Lily Garafulic (1914–2012), Chile
- Juan Garaizabal (born 1971), Spain
- Tammy Garcia (born 1969), US
- Pablo Gargallo (1881–1934), Spain
- Doreen Garner (born 1986), US
- Jim Gary (1939–2006), US
- Jalal Garyaghdi (1914–2001), Azerbaijan
- Rosalie Gascoigne (1917–1999), Australia
- Jean-Marie Gaspar (1861–1931), Belgium
- Gill Gatfield (born 1963), New Zealand
- Henri Gaudier-Brzeska (1891–1915), France
- Marea Gazzard (1928–2013), Australia
- Guillaume Geefs (1805–1883), Belgium
- Joseph Geefs (1808–1885), Belgium
- Karel Hendrik Geerts (1807–1855), Belgium
- Gego (1912–1994), Germany/Venezuela
- Vincenzo Gemito (1852–1929), Italy
- Isa Genzken (born 1948), Germany
- Helen Margaret George (1883–1982), England
- Tommaso Geraci (1931–2020), Italy
- Gerður Helgadóttir (1928–1975), Iceland
- Nikolaus Gerhaert (fl. c. 1460–1473), County of Holland/Burgundian Netherlands
- Jean-Léon Gérôme (1824–1904), France
- Eugenie Gershoy (1901–1986), US
- Lorenzo Ghiberti (1378–1455), Italy
- Alberto Giacometti (1901–1966), Switzerland
- Diego Giacometti (1902–1985), Switzerland
- Giambologna (1529–1608), Flanders/Italy
- Grinling Gibbons (1648–1721), Netherlands/England
- Louise Giblin (born 1963), England
- John Gibson (1790–1866), Wales/Italy
- Gilbert and George (born 1943 and 1942), England
- Alfred Gilbert (1854–1934), England
- Stephen Gilbert (1910–2007), Scotland
- Margaret Giles (1868–1949), England
- Eric Gill (1882–1940), England
- Ernest Gillick (1874–1951), England
- Charles Ginnever (1931–2019), US
- François Girardon (1628–1715), France
- Karin Giusti (born 1955), Italy/US
- Lady Feodora Gleichen (1861–1922), England
- Glykon of Athens, 4th c. BCE
- Robert Gober (born 1954), US
- Gilles-Lambert Godecharle (1750–1835), Belgium
- Cyprian Godebski (1835–1909), Poland
- Keith Godwin (1916–1991), England
- Andy Goldsworthy (born 1956), England
- Anna Golubkina (1864–1927), Russia
- Julio González (1876–1942), Spain
- Dominique Gonzalez-Foerster (born 1965), France
- Frances M. Goodwin (1855–1929), US
- Dora Gordine (1895–1991), Estonia/England
- Antony Gormley (born 1950), England
- Józef Gosławski (1908–1963), Poland
- Thomas R. Gould (1818–1881), US
- Michel Goulet (born 1944), Canada
- Elsa Gramcko (1925–1994), Venezuela
- Robert Graham (1938–2008), US
- Pierre Granche (1948–1997), Canada
- Paul Granlund (1925–2003), US
- Mary Grant (1931–2008), Scotland/England
- Georges Grard (1901–1984), Belgium
- Nancy Graves (1939–1995), US
- Bruce Gray (1956–2019), US
- El Greco (1541–1614), Greece/Spain
- Renée Green (born 1959), US
- Gertrude Greene (1904–1956), US
- Horatio Greenough (1805–1852), US
- Christine Gregory (1879–1963), England
- John Gregory, (1879–1958), England/US
- Lillian Griffith (1877–1972), Wales
- Frances Grimes (1869–1963), US
- Tom Grimsey (1960–2014), England
- Giuseppe Grisoni (1699–1796), Italy
- Guillaume de Groot (1839–1922), Belgium
- Chaim Gross (1904–1991), US/Ukraine
- Mimi Gross (born 1940), US
- Catrin G. Grosse (born 1964), Germany
- Robert Grosvenor (born 1937), US
- Sabina Grzimek (born 1942), Germany
- Oswaldo Guayasamín (1919–1999), Ecuador
- Émile Guillemin (1841–1907), France
- Genco Gulan (born 1969), Turkey
- Don Gummer (born 1946), US
- Gunnfríður Jónsdóttir (1889–1968), Iceland
- Ángela Gurría (1929–2023), Mexico
- Jakob Guttmann (1811–1860), Hungary/Austria

== H ==
- Gabriela von Habsburg (born 1956), Luxembourg/Georgia
- Thomas Hadden (1871–1940), Scotland
- Ernst Julius Haehnel (1811–1891), Germany
- Emanuel Hahn (1881–1957), Germany/Canada
- Étienne Hajdú (1907–1996), Hungary/France
- Petrit Halilaj (born 1986), Kosovo
- Nigel Hall (born 1943), England
- Thomas Symington Halliday (1902–1998), Scotland
- Hallsteinn Sigurðsson (born 1945), Iceland
- Emmeline Halse (1853–1930), England
- Maggi Hambling (born 1945), England
- Ann Hamilton (born 1956), US
- Harmony Hammond (born 1944), US
- Han Sai Por (韓少芙, born 1943), Singapore
- Duane Hanson (1925–1996), US
- Tetsuo Harada (原田哲男, born 1949), Japan/France
- Haroshi (born 1978), Japan
- Jerry Harris (1945–2016), US
- Rachel Harrison (born 1966), US
- Frederick Hart (1943–1999), US
- Viktor Hartmann (1834–1873), Russia
- Bessie Harvey (1929–1994), US
- Herbert Haseltine (1877–1962), Italy/US
- Per Hasselberg (1850–1894), Sweden
- Mona Hatoum (born 1952), Lebanon/England
- Rudolf Hausner (1914–1995), Austria
- Joseph Havel (born 1954), US
- Laila Havilio (born 1960), Chile
- Benjamin Waterhouse Hawkins (1807–1889), England
- Jann Haworth (born 1942), US
- Gabriel Hayes (1909–1978), Ireland
- Thomas Alphonso Hayley (1780–1800), England
- Faye HeavyShield (born 1953), Canada
- Hans Hedberg (1917–2007), Sweden/France
- Deborah Hede (born 1959), US
- Gwen Heeney (1952–2016}, UK
- Henry Heerup (1907–1993), Denmark
- Mathilde ter Heijne (born 1969), Netherlands/Germany
- Elsie Henderson (1880–1967), England
- Joseph Morgan Henninger (1906–1999), US
- Camille Henrot (born 1978), France
- David Eugene Henry (born 1946), US
- Barbara Hepworth (1903–1975), England
- Gordon Herickx (1900–1953), England
- Gábor Heritesz (born 1948), Hungary
- Gertrude Hermes (1901–1983), England
- Ernst Herter (1846–1917), Germany
- Eva Hesse (1936–1970), Germany/US
- Cicely Hey (1896–1980), England
- Nicola Hicks (born 1960), England
- Peter Hide (born 1944), England
- Helena Hietanen (born 1963), Finland
- Amelia Robertson Hill (1821–1904), Scotland
- Eila Hiltunen (1922–2003), Finland
- Margel Hinder (1906–1995), Australia/US
- Nicky Hirst (born 1963), England
- Robert Hitchcock (born 1944), Australia
- Jacques Hnizdovsky (1915–1985), Ukraine/US
- Prince Hoare (c. 1711–1769), England
- Peter Hodgkinson (born 1967), England
- Rayner Hoff (1894–1937), Isle of Man/Australia
- Malvina Hoffman (1885–1966), US
- John Hogan (1800–1858), Ireland
- Francisco de Holanda (1517–1585), Portugal
- Elizabeth Bradford Holbrook (1913–2009), Canada
- Nancy Holt (1938–2014), US
- Jenny Holzer (born 1950), US
- Sing Hoo (1911–2000), China/Canada
- Henry Richard Hope-Pinker (1850–1927), England
- Donal Hord (1902–1966), US
- Milton Horn (1906–1995), Russia/US
- Rebecca Horn (born 1944), Germany
- Roni Horn (born 1955), US
- Jocelyn Horner (1902–1973), England
- Gerald T. Horrigan (1903–1995), US
- János Horvay (1873–1944), Hungary
- Harriet Hosmer (1830–1908), US
- Ahad Hosseini (born 1944), Azerbaijani Iranian
- Jean Antoine Houdon (1741–1828), France
- Allan Houser (1914–1994), US
- Shirazeh Houshiary (born 1955), Iran
- Youssef Howayek (يوسف حويك ,1883–1962), Lebanon
- Robert H. Hudson (born 1938), US
- Anita Huffington (born 1934), US
- Nene Humphrey (born 1947), US
- Irma Hünerfauth (1907–1998), Germany
- Richard Hunt (1935–2023), US
- Anna Hyatt Huntington (1876–1973), US
- Beatrice Huntington (1889–1988), Scotland
- Jonty Hurwitz (born 1969), South Africa/England
- Allen Hutchinson (1855–1929), England
- John Hutchison (1832–1910), Scotland

== I ==
- Idel Ianchelevici (1909–1994), Russia/Belgium
- René Iché (1897–1954), France
- Antonin Idrac (1849–1884), France
- Kolë Idromeno (1860–1939), Ottoman Empire/Albania
- Franz Iffland (1862–1935), Germany
- Leiko Ikemura (イケムラレイコ, born 1951), Japan/Switzerland
- Iola Abraham Ikkidluak (1936–2003), Canada
- Tivi Ilisituk (1933–2012), Canada
- Jörg Immendorff (1945–2007), Germany
- Elek Imredy (1912–1994), Hungary/Canada
- Léon Indenbaum (1890–1981), Russia/France
- Anna Indermaur (1894–1980), Switzerland
- Robert Indermaur (born 1947), Switzerland
- Charlie Inukpuk (born 1941), Canada
- Johnny Inukpuk (1911–2007), Canada
- Osuitok Ipeelee (1923–2005), Canada
- Robert Irwin (1932–2023), US
- Pamela Irving (born 1960), Australia
- Martin Isler (1926–2013), US
- Ismail Fatah Al Turk (1934 or 1938–2004, إسماعيل فتاح الترك), Iraq
- Chauncey Ives (1810–1894), US
- Samisa Passauralu Ivilla (1924–1995), Canada
- Linde Ivimey (born 1965), Australia
- Vladimir Izdebskiy (1882–1965), Russia
- Miklós Izsó (1831–1875), Hungary

== J ==
- Robert Jacobsen (1912–1993), Denmark
- Ann James (1925–2011), England/Canada
- Heather Jansch (1948–2021), England
- Joseph Jaquet (1822–1898), Belgium
- Kingwatsiak Jaw (1962–2012), Canada
- Louis Jehotte (c. 1804–1884), Belgium
- Mark Jenkins (born 1970), US
- Carl Paul Jennewein (1890–1978), US
- Giennadij Jerszow (born 1967), Poland/Ukraine
- Jiang Shuo (蔣朔, born 1958), China
- Patricia Johanson (born 1940), US
- Goscombe John (1860–1952), Wales
- Adelaide Johnson (1859–1955), US
- J. Seward Johnson, Jr. (1930–2020), US
- Sargent Johnson (1886–1967), US
- Adrian Jones (1845–1938), England
- Allen Jones (born 1937), England
- Jacobine Jones (1897–1976), England/Canada
- Einar Jónsson (1874–1954), Iceland
- Ríkarður Jónsson (1888–1972), Iceland
- Karin Jonzen (1914–1998), England
- Asger Jorn (1914–1973), Denmark
- Donald Judd (1928–1994), US
- Gyula Juhász (1876–1913), Hungary
- Pierre Julien (1731–1804), France
- Peter Clodt von Jürgensburg (1805–1867), Russia

== K ==
- Sadik Kaceli (1914–2000), Albania
- Kazuo Kadonaga (角永和夫, born 1946), Japan
- Juozas Kalinauskas (born 1935), Lithuania
- Junichi Kakizaki (柿崎順, born 1971), Japan
- Reena Saini Kallat (born 1973), India
- Ede Kallós (1866–1950), Hungary
- Ferenc Kalmar (1928–2013), Yugoslavia/Serbia
- Fyodor Kamensky (1836–1913), Russia
- Gertrude Farquharson Boyle Kanno (1876–1937), US
- Bernadette Kanter (born 1950), France
- Peter Kapschutschenko (1915–2006), Ukraine/USA
- Anish Kapoor (अनीश कपूर, born 1954), India/England
- Nadim Karam (نديم كرم, born 1957), Lebanon
- Alex Katz (born 1927), US
- Lila Katzen (1925–1998), US
- John Kaufman (1941–2002), England
- Ivan Kavaleridze (1887–1978), Ukraine/Soviet Union
- Davidee Kavik (1915–1996)), Canada
- Nathaniel Kaz (1917–2010), US
- Charles Keck (1875–1951), US
- Ellsworth Kelly (1923–2015), US
- Kate Kelly (1882–1964), US
- Zoltán Kemény (1907–1965), Hungary/Switzerland
- Starr Kempf (1917–1995), US
- Lev Kerbel (1917–2003), Russia/Ukraine
- Mark Khaisman (born 1958), Ukraine/US
- Rachel Khedoori (born 1964), Australia
- Bharti Kher (born 1969), England
- Kiakshuk (1886–1966), Canada
- Anselm Kiefer (born 1945), Germany
- Manfred Kielnhofer (born 1967), Austria
- Kim Seo-kyung and Kim Eun-sung (김서경/김운성, living), Korea
- Inge King (1915–2016), Germany/Australia
- Phillip King (1934–2021), England
- William King (1925–2015), US
- Alison Kinnaird (born 1949), Scotland
- Martin Kippenberger (1953–1997), Germany
- Rick Kirby (born 1952), England
- Per Kirkeby (1938–2018), Denmark
- Herbert Kisza (born 1943), Czech painter and sculptor
- Henry Hudson Kitson (1863/1865–1947), US
- Theo Alice Ruggles Kitson (1871–1932), US
- Franz Klein (1779–1840), Austria
- Peter Klodt (1805–1867), Russia
- Lorena Kloosterboer (born 1962), Netherlands/Argentina
- Vyacheslav Klykov (1939–2006), Russia
- Rachel Kneebone (born 1973), England
- Katarzyna Kobro (1898–1951), Poland
- Eva Koch (born 1953), Denmark
- Kiki Kogelnik (1935–1997), Austria
- Ida Kohlmeyer (1912–1997), US
- Meeli Kõiva (born 1960), Estonia
- Eric de Kolb (1916–2001), Austria/US
- Georg Kolbe (1877–1947), Germany
- Kristina Koljaka (1916–2005), Albania
- Andrei Kolkoutine (born 1957), Soviet Union/Russia
- Käthe Kollwitz (1867–1945), Germany
- Inna Kolomiets (1921–2005), Ukraine
- Ruben Komangapik (born 1976), Canada
- Ludwik Konarzewski (1885–1954), Poland
- Ludwik Konarzewski Jr. (1918–1989), Poland
- Jeff Koons (born 1955), US
- Jaan Koort (1883–1935), Estonia
- Eugene Kormendi (1889–1959), Hungary/US
- Aggelika Korovessi (born 1952), Greece
- Roman Kost (1954–2010), Ukraine
- Alexander Kostetsky (born 1984), Ukraine
- Howard Kottler (1930–1989), US
- Margit Kovács (1902–1977), Hungary
- Mikhail Kozlovsky (1753–1802), Russia
- David Kracov (born 1968), US
- Adam Kraft (1460–1509), Germany
- Louise Kramer (1923–2020), US
- Pinchus Kremegne (1890–1981), Lithuania/France
- Kresilas (Cresilla, c. 480 – c. 410 BC), Ancient Greece
- Madeleine Isserkut Kringayak (1928–1984), Canada
- Hildo Krop (1884–1970), Netherlands
- Frano Kršinić (1897–1982), Austria–Hungary/Yugoslavia
- Borys Krylov (born 1976), Ukraine
- Otakar Kubín (1883–1969), Austria-Hungary/France
- Jimmy Kuehnle (born 1979), US
- Oleg Kulik (born 1961), Russia/Ukraine
- Paul Kuniholm (born 1970), Sweden
- Edward J. Kuntze (1826–1870), US
- Floyd Kuptana (1964–2021), Canada
- Yayoi Kusama (草間彌生, 1929–2026), Japan
- László Kutas (1936–2023), Hungary
- Marie Kuunnuaq (1933–1990), Canada
- Kyung-hee Hong (홍경희, born 1954), South Korea

== L ==
- Gaston Lachaise (1882–1935), France/US
- Rachel Lachowicz (born 1964), US
- Georges Lacombe (1868–1916), France
- Anna Coleman Ladd (1878–1939), US
- Pieter van Laer (1599–1642), France
- Marie-Jo Lafontaine (born 1950), Belgium
- Jules Lagae (1862–1931), Belgium
- Arnold Lakhovsky (1880–1937), Ukraine/Russia
- Lili Lakich (born 1944), US
- Jacques de Lalaing (1858–1917), Belgium
- Rosy Lamb (born 1973), US
- Jef Lambeaux (1852–1908), Belgium
- Jean Lambert-Rucki (1888–1967), Poland/France
- Karen LaMonte (born 1967), US
- Abraham-César Lamoureux (c. 1640 – 1692), France
- Eugene Lanceray (1875–1946), Russia/Soviet Union
- Gun Lanciai (1920–2013), Finland/Sweden
- Sigalit Landau (סיגלית לנדאו, born 1969), Israel
- Edwin Henry Landseer (1802–1873), England
- Abigail Lane (born 1967), England
- Cal Lane (born 1968), Canada
- Greer Lankton (1958–1996), US
- Édouard Lantéri (1848–1917), France/England
- François-Raoul Larche (1860–1912), France
- Liz Larner (born 1960), US
- Francesco Laurana (c. 1430 – pre–1502), Venetian Dalmatia
- Henri Laurens (1885–1954), France
- Jean-Paul Laurens (1838–1921), France
- Billie Lawless (born 1950), US
- Mary Lawrence (Tonetti) (1868–1945), US
- Lee Lawrie (1877–1963), US
- Louise Lawson (c. 1860s – 1899), US
- Robert Lazzarini (born 1965), US
- Pierre Le Gros the Elder (1629–1714), France
- Pierre Le Gros the Younger (1666–1719), France/Italy
- Sheila Lea (1901–1992), England
- Sarra Lebedeva (1892–1967), Soviet Union
- Jean-Yves Lechevallier (born 1946), France
- Mike Leckie (born 1950), US
- Gilbert Ledward (1888–1960), England
- Lee Bul (이불, born 1964), Korea
- Hippolyte Lefèbvre (1863–1935), France
- Fernand Léger (1881–1955), France
- Wilhelm Lehmbruck (1881–1919), Germany
- Lei Yixin (雷宜锌, born 1954), China
- Frederic Leighton (1830–1896), England
- August Leimbach (1882–1965), Germany/US
- Oliviero Leonardi (1921–2019), Italy
- Leone Leoni (Pompeo Leoni, 1509–1590), Italy
- Alessandro Leopardi (born 1512), Italy
- Louis Lerambert (1620–1670), France
- Felipe Lettersten (1957–2003), Peru
- Leo Leuppi (1893–1972), Switzerland
- Ruby Levick (1871–1940), Wales
- Maya Cohen Levy (مايا كوهن لافي, born 1955), Israel
- Edmonia Lewis (c. 1844–1907), US/Italy
- Sol LeWitt (1928–2007), US
- Li Mei-shu (李梅樹, 1902–1983), China
- Liao Chi-chun (廖繼春, 1902–1976), China/Taiwan
- Alexander Liberman (1912–1999), Ukraine/US
- Miklós Ligeti (1871–1944), Hungary
- Allan Linder (born 1966), US
- Jacques Lipchitz (1891–1973), Lithuania/France
- Vasko Lipovac (1931–2006), Yugoslavia/Croatia
- Jessie Lipscomb (1861–1952), England
- Donald Lipski (born 1947), US
- Seymour Lipton (1903–1986), US
- Errol Lloyd (born 1943), Jamaica/England
- Kirsten Lockenwitz (born 1932), Denmark
- Tom Lomax (born 1945), England
- Germán Londoño (born 1961), Colombia
- Richard Long (born 1945), England
- Evelyn Beatrice Longman (1874–1954), US
- Bert van Loo (1946–2016), Netherlands
- Hew Lorimer (1907–1993), Scotland
- Frances Loring (1887–1968), US/Canada
- John Graham Lough (1798–1876), England
- Lu Pin (陆频, born 1972), China
- Sarah Lucas (born 1962), England
- Bernardino Ludovisi (1693–1749), Italy
- Donald De Lue (1897–1988), US
- Bernhard Luginbühl (1929–2011), Switzerland
- John Luke (1906–1975), Ireland
- Juan Luna (1857–1899), Philippines
- George Lundeen (born 1948), US
- Charles Lutyens (1933–2021), England
- Gabriele von Lutzau (born 1954), Germany
- James Edward Lykins, US
- Norma Lyon (1929–2011), US
- Michael Lyons (1943–2019), UK
- Lysippos (4th c. BC), Greece

== M ==
- Molly Macalister (1920–1979), New Zealand
- Richard MacDonald (born 1946), US
- Hamish Mackie (born 1973), England
- Frederick William MacMonnies (1863–1937), US
- Carol Brooks MacNeil (1871–1944), US
- Jilma Madera (1915–2000), Cuba
- Marianne Maderna (born 1944), Austria
- Huberto Maestas (living), US
- Ailsa Magnus (born 1967), Scotland
- Alice Maher (born 1956), Ireland
- Anna Mahler (1904–1988), Austria
- Benedetto da Maiano (1442–1497), Italy
- Aristide Maillol (1861–1944), France
- Terence Main (born 1954), US
- Giovanni Battista Maini (1691–1752), Italy
- Rudolf Maison (1854–1904), Germany
- Jan van Mansdale (1345–1425), Southern Netherlands
- Memos Makris (Makrisz Agamemnon, 1913–1993), Greece/Hungary
- Tosia Malamud (1923–2008), Ukraine/Mexico
- Estuardo Maldonado (1930–2023), Ecuador
- Kazimir Malevich (1879–1935), Ukraine/Poland
- Edna Manley (1900–1987), Jamaica
- Enook Manomie (1941–2006), Canada
- Paul Howard Manship (1885–1966), US
- Elsie March (1884–1974), England
- Pompeo Marchesi (1783–1858), Italy
- Ondrej Mares (1949–2008), Czechoslovakia/Australia
- Teresa Margolles (born 1963), Mexico
- Marino Marini (1901–1980), Italy
- Carlo Marochetti (1867–1905), Italy/France
- Géza Maróti (1875–1941), Hungary
- Laurent Marqueste (1848–1920), France
- Maria Marshall (born 1966), England/Switzerland
- Matschinsky-Denninghoff (Martin, 1921–2020; Brigitta, 1921–2011), Germany
- Marcel Martí (1925–2010), Spain
- Kenneth Martin (1905–1984), England
- Knox Martin (1923–2022), US
- Arturo Martini (1889–1947), Italy
- Taslim Martin (born 1962), England
- Oliverio Martínez (1901–1938), Mexico
- László Marton (1925–2008), Hungary
- Ivan Martos (1754–1835), Ukraine/Russia
- Ferenc Martyn (1899–1986), Hungary
- Raymond Mason (1922–2010), England/France
- Adéla Matasová (born 1940), Czechoslovakia/Czech Republic
- Henri Matisse (1869–1954), France
- Amanda Matthews (born 1968), US
- Retta T. Matthews (1856–1899), US
- Sally Matthews (born 1964), England
- János Mattis-Teutsch (1884–1960), Hungary/Romania
- Aleksandr Matveyev (1878–1960), Russia/Soviet Union
- Catherine Mawer (1803–1877), England
- Robert Mawer (1807–1854), England
- Monique Mayère (born 1944), France
- Daphne Mayo (1895–1982), Australia
- John McKenna (born 1964), Scotland
- Bruce McLean (born 1944), Scotland
- William McMillan (1887–1977), Scotland
- Clement Meadmore (1929–2005), Australia/US
- Ferenc Medgyessy (1881–1958), Hungary
- Rooma Mehra (born 1967), India
- Jean-Louis-Ernest Meissonier (1815–1891), France
- Colin Melbourne (1928–2009), England
- Julius T. Melchers (1829–1908), Germany/US
- Dina Melicov (1905–1969), US
- Volodymyr Melnychenko (1932–2023), Ukraine
- Joseph Mendes da Costa (1863–1939), Netherlands
- Ana Mendieta (1948–1985), Cuba/US
- Pedro de Mena (1628–1688), Spain
- Pierre-Jules Mêne (1810–1879), France
- Anjolie Ela Menon (born 1940), India
- Geneva Mercer (1889–1984), US
- Antonin Mercié (1845–1916), France
- Leonard Stanford Merrifield (1880–1943), England
- Marisa Merz (1926–2019), Italy
- Juan de Mesa (1583–1627), Spain
- Annette Messager (born 1943), France
- Jean Messagier (1920–1999), France
- Franz Xaver Messerschmidt (1736–1783), Germany/Austria
- Ivan Meštrović (1883–1962), Austria-Hungary/Yugoslavia
- Constantin Meunier (1831–1905), Belgium
- Michelangelo (1475–1564), Italy
- Michelozzo di Bartolomeo (1391 – c. 1472), Italy
- Leo Michelson (1887–1978), Latvia/France
- Léon Mignon (1847–1898), Belgium
- Alexander Milov (born 1979), Ukraine
- Marta Minujín (born 1943), Argentina
- Mikhail Osipovich Mikeshin (1835–1896), Russia
- Andy Miki (1918–1983), Canada
- Qaunak Mikkigak (1932–2020), Canada
- Gustave Miklos (1888–1967), Hungary/France
- Pavel Mikšík (born 1943), Czechoslovakia/Slovakia
- J. Maxwell Miller (1877–1933), US
- Carl Milles (1875–1955), Sweden
- Francis Davis Millet (1846–1912), US
- Clark Mills (1810–1883), US
- John Mills (born 1933), England
- Carol Milne (born 1962), Canada
- Thomas Milnes (c. 1810 – 1888), England
- George Minne (1866–1941), Belgium
- Joan Miró (1893–1983), Spain
- Igor Mitoraj (1944–2014), Poland
- Aiko Miyanaga (宮永愛子, born 1974), Japan
- Rezső Móder (born 1954), Hungary
- Amedeo Modigliani (1884–1920), Italy/France
- Jules Moigniez (1835–1894), France
- Antonin Moine (1796–1849), France
- Leo Mol (1915–2009), Canada/Ukraine
- Marg Moll (1884–1977), Germany
- Cathy de Monchaux (born 1960), England
- Paul de Monchaux (born 1934), Canada/England
- Juan Martínez Montañés (1568–1649), Spain
- Osvaldo Yero Montero (born 1969), Cuba
- Giulio Monteverde (1837–1917), Italy
- Hippolyte Montillie (late 19th, early 20th c.), France
- Lola Mora (1866–1936), Argentina
- Polly Morgan (born 1980), England
- Esther Moore (1857–1934), England
- Henry Moore (1898–1986), England
- Giuseppe Moretti (1857–1935), Italy/US
- Junko Mori (森純子, born 1974), Japan
- Sergio Rossetti Morosini (born 1953), Brazil/US
- Hilda Grossman Morris (1911–1991), US
- George Morrison (1919–2000), US
- Thaddeus Mosley (1926–2026), US
- John Mossman (1817–1890), England/Scotland
- William Mossman (1793–1851), Scotland
- Hippolyte Moulin (1832–1884), France
- Jenny Mucchi-Wiegmann (1895–1969), Germany
- Peeter Mudist (1942–2013), Estonia
- Ron Mueck (born 1958), Australia/England
- Vera Mukhina (1889–1953), Russia/Soviet Union
- Edwin Roscoe Mullins (1848–1907), England
- Genc Mulliqi (born 1966), Albania
- Kellypalik Mungitok (1940–?), Canada
- Takashi Murakami (村上隆, born 1962), Japan
- Ethel Myers (1881–1960), US
- Forrest Myers (born 1941), US

== N ==
- Fujiko Nakaya (中谷芙二子, born 1933), Japan
- Naondo Nakamura (中村直人, 1905–1981), Japan
- Reuben Nakian (1897–1986), US
- Yoshitomo Nara (奈良美智, born 1959), Japan
- Oscar Rodríguez Naranjo (1907–2006), Colombia
- David Nash (born 1945), England/Wales
- Adela Neffa (1922–2019), Uruguayan-born/Argentina
- Ernst Neizvestny (1925–2016), Soviet Union/US
- Simeon Nelson (born 1963), England/Australia
- Oscar Nemon (1906–1985), Austria–Hungary/England
- Manuel Neri (1930–2021), US
- Marlene Neubauer-Woerner (1918–2010), Germany
- Mariele Neudecker (born 1965), Germany/England
- Louise Nevelson (1900–1988), Ukraine/US
- Blanche Nevin (1841–1925), US
- Avis Newman (born 1946), England
- Alexander Ney (born 1939), Soviet Union/US
- Elisabet Ney (1833–1907), Germany/US
- Ngongo ya Chintu (19th century, Democratic Republic of Congo
- Paul Niclausse (1879–1958), France
- Victor Nicolas (1906–1979), France
- Charles Henry Niehaus (1855–1935), US
- Kai Nielsen (1882–1924), Denmark
- Minoru Niizuma (新妻実, 1930–1998), Japan
- Adriaan Nijs (1683–1771), Southern Netherlands
- Philips Alexander Nijs (1724–1805), Southern Netherlands
- Ida Göthilda Nilsson (1840–1920), Sweden
- Vasiliev Nini (born 1954), Albania/US
- Adamie Niviaxie (1925–?), Canada
- Astrid Noack (1888–1954), Denmark
- Isamu Noguchi (1904–1988), US
- Cady Noland (born 1956), US
- Joseph Nollekens (1737–1823), England
- Max Magnus Norman (born 1973), Sweden
- Elizabeth Norton (1887–1985), US
- Sassona Norton (born 1942), Israel and US
- John Van Nost (died 1729), Spanish Netherlands/England
- Jedd Novatt (born 1958), US

== O ==
- Alejandro Obregón (1920–1992), Colombia
- John O'Carroll (born 1958), England
- Denis O'Connor (20th–21st century), Ireland/England
- Diarmuid Byron O'Connor (born 1964), England
- Katie Ohe (born 1937), Canada
- Landolin Ohmacht (1760–1834), Germany
- Tankut Öktem, (1941–2007), Turkey
- Claes Oldenburg (1929–2022), US
- Yoko Ono (小野洋子, born 1933), Japan/US
- Bruce Onobrakpeya (born 1932), Nigeria
- Méret Oppenheim (1913–1985), Germany/Switzerland
- Ezra Orion (עזרא אוריון, 1934–2015), Palestine/Israel
- Jules Olitski (1922–2007), US
- Nathan Oliveira (1928–2010), US
- Sheokjuk Oqutaq (1920–1982), Canada
- Andrea Orcagna (1320–1368), Italy
- Chana Orloff (חנה אורלוף, 1968–1888) Israel/Ukraine
- Boris Orlovsky (1793–1837), Russia
- Lucy Orta (born 1966), England/France
- Antonio León Ortega (1907–1991), Spain
- George Earl Ortman (1926–2015), US
- Daniel Ost (born 1955), Belgium
- Karlheinz Oswald (born 1958), Germany
- Jorge Oteiza (1908–2003), Spain
- Ülo Õun (1940–1988), Estonia
- Adrienne Outlaw (born 1970), US
- Zachary Oxman (born 1968), US

== P ==
- Ana Maria Pacheco (born 1943), Brazil
- Dimitrie Paciurea (1873 or 1875–1932), Romania
- Janaq Paço (1914–1991), Greece/Albania
- Aaron Padilla (born 1974), US
- Bashka Paeff (1889–1979), US
- Augustin Pajou (1730–1809), France
- Jim Pallas (born 1941), US
- Marta Pan (1923–2008), Hungary/France
- John Pangnark (1920–1980), Canada
- Eduardo Paolozzi (1924–2005), Scotland
- Eduardo Luigi Paolozzi (1924–2005), Scotland
- George Papashvily (1898–1978), Georgia, US
- Josie Pamiutu Papialuk (1918–1996), Canada
- Bruce Papitto (born 1958), US
- Edgar George Papworth Senior (1809–1866), England
- Edgar George Papworth Junior (1832–1927), England
- Mykhailo Parashchuk (1878–1963), Ukraine
- Corrado Parducci (1900–1981), Italy/US
- Richard Henry Park (1832–1902), US
- Constance-Anne Parker (1921–2016), England
- Cornelia Parker (born 1956), England
- Harold Parker (1873–1962), Australia/England
- Philippe Parmentier (1787–1867), Belgium
- Denis Alva Parsons (1934–2012), England
- William Ordway Partridge (1861–1930), US
- Odhise Paskali (1903–1985), Albania
- János Pásztor (1881–1945), Hungary
- Joseph Noel Paton (1821–1901), Scotland
- Max Patté (born 1977), England
- Philip Pavia (1911–2005), US
- Hendrik Peeters (1815–1869), Belgium
- Fiona Peever (born 1964), England
- Slobodan Pejić (1944–2006), Yugoslavia/Slovenia
- Alicia Penalba (1918–1982), Argentina
- James Peniston (born 1973), US
- Giles Penny (born 1962), England
- Ardian Pepa (born 1977), Albania
- Beverly Pepper (1922–2020), US
- Peter Laszlo Peri (1899–1967), Hungary/Germany
- Constant Permeke (1886–1952), Belgium
- Jean-Joseph Perraud (1819–1876), France
- Raymond Persinger (born 1959), US
- Ambrosius Petruzzy (died 1652), Italy
- Judy Pfaff (born 1946), England/US
- Niki de Saint Phalle (1930–2002), France
- Phidias (c. 490 BC – c. 430 BC), Greece
- Liz Phillips (born 1951), US
- Pablo Picasso (1881–1973), Spain/France
- Patricia Piccinini (born 1965), Australia
- Attilio Piccirilli (1866–1945), Italy/US
- Furio Piccirilli (1869–1949), Italy/US
- Patrick Pietropoli (born 1953), France
- Yulia Pinkusevich (born 1982), Ukraine/US
- David Ruben Piqtoukun (born 1950), Canada
- Looty Pijamini (born 1953)
- Johann Georg Pinsel (1715–1761), Poland/Ukraine
- David Ruben Piqtoukun (born 1950)
- Giovanni Pisano (c. 1250–1314), Italy
- Nicola Pisano (c. 1220–1278), Italy
- Oopik Pitsuilak (born 1946), Canada
- Jaume Plensa (born 1955), Spain
- Pierre-Denis Plumier (1688–1721), Southern Netherlands
- Raúl Podestá (1899–1970), Argentine painter and sculptor
- Antonio del Pollaiuolo (1429/33–1498), Italy
- Polykleitos (fl. 5th century BC), Greece
- F.W. Pomeroy (1856–1924), England
- Rona Pondick (born 1952), US
- Eegyvudluk Pootoogook (1931–2000), Canada
- Kananginak Pootoogook (1935–2010), Canada
- Antoni Popiel (1865–1910), Poland/Ukraine
- Charlotte Posenenske (1930–1985), Germany
- Leonid Pozen (1849–1921), Russia/Ukraine
- Marjetica Potrč (born 1953), Slovenia
- Don Potter (1902–2004), England
- Edward Clark Potter (1857–1923), US
- Etiyé Dimma Poulsen (born 1968), Ethiopia/Denmark
- Richard Pousette-Dart (1916–1992), US
- Hiram Powers (1805–1873), US
- Preston Powers (1842–1904), US
- Susan Mohl Powers (born 1944), US
- James Pradier (1790–1852), France
- Marina Núñez del Prado (1910–1995), Bolivia
- Karl Prantl (1923–2010), Austria
- Bela Pratt (1867–1917), US
- Harvey Pratt (1941–2025), US
- Praxiteles (fl. 4th century BC), Greece
- Katherine T. Hooper Prescott (1851–1926), US
- Gary Lee Price (born 1943), US
- Alexander Phimister Proctor (1860–1950), US
- W. Stanley "Sandy" Proctor (born 1939), US
- Yevgeniy Prokopov (born 1950), Soviet Union/Ukraine/US
- Nancy Elizabeth Prophet (1890–1960), US
- Jacques Prou (1655–1706), France
- Vivien ap Rhys Pryce (born 1937), England
- Pierre Puget (1622–1694), France
- Nancy Pukingrnak (born 1940), Canada
- Laila Pullinen (1933–2015), Finland
- Martin Puryear (born 1941), US
- Brenda Putnam (1890–1975), US
- Ethel Pye (1882–1960), England
- Patrick Pye (1929–2018), England/Ireland
- William Pye (born 1938), England

== Q ==
- Paniluk Qamanirq (born 1935), Canada
- Miriam Marealik Qiyuk (born 1933), Canada
- Edmond Thomas Quinn (1868–1929), US

== R ==
- Rabarama (born 1969), Italy
- Arpád Račko (1930–2015), Hungary/Slovakia
- Agim Rada (born 1953), Albania
- Vanja Radauš (1906–1975), Austria–Hungary/Yugoslavia
- John Rädecker (1885–1956), Netherlands
- Majstor Radovan (13th century), Dalmatia
- Kosta Angeli Radovani (1916–2002), Yugoslavia/Croatia
- Ronald Rae (born 1946), Scotland
- Dorothee Raetsch (born 1940), Germany
- Mario Raggi (1821–1907), Italy
- Tanya Ragir (born 1955), US
- Kristaq Rama (1932–1998), Albania
- Caroline Ramersdorfer (born 1960), US
- Jean-Etienne Ramey (1796–1852), France
- Teodoro Ramos Blanco (1902–1972), Cuba
- Olga Rapay-Markish (1929–2012), Ukraine
- Antonietta Raphael (1895–1975), Italy
- Elaine Rapp (1927–2019), US
- Bogdan Rață (born 1984), Romania
- Svend Rathsack (1885–1941), Denmark
- Christian Daniel Rauch (1777–1857), Germany
- Charles Ray (artist) (born 1953), US
- Marc Raymond (born 1968), Switzerland
- Vinnie Ream (1847–1914), US
- Rachel Reckitt (1908–1995), England
- Hazel Reeves (living), England
- Peter Reginato (born 1945), US
- James Earl Reid (1942–2021), US
- Marc Rembold (born 1963), Switzerland
- Frederic Remington (1861–1909), US
- Ivan Rendić (1849–1932), Austria–Hungary/Yugoslavia
- George Rennie (1801/1802–1860), Scotland
- Essi Renvall (1911–1979), Finland
- Mikhail Reva (born 1960), Ukraine
- Maurice Reymond (1862–1936), Switzerland
- Hugo Rheinhold (1853–1900), Germany
- J. Massey Rhind (1860–1936), Scotland/US
- John Rhind (1828–1892), Scotland
- John Stevenson Rhind (1859–1937), Scotland
- William Birnie Rhind (1853–1933), Scotland
- Frances Rich (1910–2007), US
- Myra Reynolds Richards (1882–1934), US
- Henry Richardson (born 1961), US
- Germaine Richier (1902–1959), France
- Ligier Richier (1500–1567), France
- William Blake Richmond (1842–1921), England
- Etha Richter (1883–1977), Germany
- George Rickey (1907–2002), US
- Alice Rideout (1871–1953), US
- Linda Ridgway (born 1947), US
- Tilman Riemenschneider (1460–1531), Germany
- Teresa Feoderovna Ries (1874–1950), Russia/Austria
- Alojz Rigele (1879–1940), Hungary/Slovakia
- Anne Rigney (born 1957), Ireland
- William Henry Rinehart (1825–1874), US
- Jean-Paul Riopelle (1923–2002), Canada
- Walter Ritchie (1919–1997), England
- José de Rivera (1904–1985), US
- Giovanni della Robbia (1469 – c. 1529), Italy
- Luca della Robbia (1400–1482), Italy
- Dai Roberts (born 1974), England
- Alexander Rodchenko (1891–1956), Russia/Soviet Union
- Auguste Rodin (1840–1917), France
- Emy Roeder (1890–1971), Germany
- Luisa Roldán (1652–1706), Spain
- John Roloff (born 1947), US
- Carlo Romanelli (1872–1947), Italy
- Raffaello Romanelli (1856–1928), Italy
- Égide Rombaux (1865–1942), Belgium
- Enn Roos (1908–1990), Estonia
- Ellen Mary Rope (1855–1934), England
- Ethel Rosenfield (1910–2000), Poland/Canada
- Franz Rosei (born 1947), Austria
- Tony Rosenthal (1914–2009), US
- Louis Frederick Roslyn (1878–1940), England
- Charles Ross (born 1937), US
- Christopher Ross (1931–2023), US
- Properzia de' Rossi (c. 1490–1530), Italy
- Fred H. Roster (1944–2017), US
- Julie Rotblatt-Amrany (born 1958), US
- Frederick Roth (1892–1944), US
- Louis-François Roubiliac (1695–1792), France/England
- Victor Rousseau (1865–1954), Belgium
- Abraham Anghik Ruben (born 1951), Canada
- Barton Rubenstein (born 1962), US
- Frederick Ruckstull (1853–1942), US
- François Rude (1784–1855), France
- Charles Cary Rumsey (1879–1922), US
- Charles Marion Russell (1864–1926), US
- Stepan Ryabchenko (born 1987), Ukraine
- Ada Rybachuk (1931–2010), Ukraine
- Ursula von Rydingsvard (born 1942), Germany/US
- Adolfine Mary Ryland (1903–1983), England
- Marina Ryndzyunskaya (1877–1946), Russia/Soviet Union
- John Michael Rysbrack (1694–1770), Spanish Netherlands/England

== S ==
- Andrew Sabin (born 1958), England
- Abolhassan Khan Sadighi (1894–1995, ن صدیق–), Iran
- Nína Sæmundsson (1892–1965), Iceland, US
- Henri Sagna (born 1973), Senegal
- Pauta Saila (1916/1917–2009), Canada
- Annetta Johnson Saint-Gaudens (1869–1943), US
- Augustus Saint-Gaudens (1848–1907), US
- Louis Saint-Gaudens (1854–1913), US
- Niki de Saint-Phalle (1930–2002), France
- Takako Saito (斉藤陽子, born 1929), Japan
- Shahid Sajjad (1936–2014), India/Pakistan
- Emilio Sala (1864–1920), Italia/Ukraine
- Achille Salata (fl. 19th century), Italy
- Doris Salcedo (born 1958), Colombia
- Jawad Saleem (جواد سليم, 1920–1961), Iraq
- Louis Samain (1834–1901), Belgium
- Giuseppe Sammartino (1720–1793), Italy
- Géza Samu (fl. late 20th century), Hungary
- Kornél Sámuel (1883–1914), Hungary
- Jim Sanborn (born 1945), US
- Abbondio Sangiorgio (1798–1879), Italy
- Oles Sanin (born 1972), Ukraine
- Jacopo Sansovino (1486–1570), Italy
- Shareef Sarhan (born 1976), Palestine
- Mario Sarto (1885–1955), Italy
- Heath Satow (born 1969), US
- Augusta Savage (1892–1962), US
- Erzsébet Schaár (1905–1975), Hungary
- Johann Gottfried Schadow (1764–1850), Germany
- Rudolph Schadow (1786–1822), Germany
- Louis Schanker (1903–1981), US
- Peter Scheemakers (1691–1781), Spanish Netherlands/England
- Eric Schilsky (1898–1974), England/Scotland
- Othmar Schimkowitz (1864–1947), Hungary/Austria
- Oskar Schlemmer (1888–1943), Germany
- Andreas Schlüter (1660–1714), Germany
- Timothy Schmalz (born 1969), Canada
- Ruth Schmidt Stockhausen (1922–2014), Germany
- Bettina Scholl-Sabbatini (born 1942), Luxembourg
- Belle Kinney Scholz (1890–1959), US
- Helen Schou (1905–2006), Denmark
- Hans Schuler (1874–1951), US
- Barbara Schwartz (1949–2006), US
- Dorit Schwartz (born 1959), US
- Peter Schwickerath (born 1942), Germany
- Levi Scofield (1842–1917), US
- Scopas (3rd c. BCE), Greece
- Andy Scott (born 1964), Scotland
- Kathleen Scott (1878–1947), England
- Tim Scott (born 1937), England
- Janet Scudder (1869–1940), US
- Sean Scully (born 1945), Ireland/US
- Glen Seator, (1956–2002), US
- Giorgio da Sebenico (c. 1410–1475), Venetian Dalmatia
- Lasar Segall (1891–1957), Germany/Brazil
- Amarnath Sehgal (1922–2007), India
- Joseph Seigenthaler (born 1959), US
- Davina Semo (born 1981), US
- Ensio Seppänen (1924–2008), Finland
- Maria Serebriakova (born 1965), Russia/Germany
- József Seregi (born 1939), Hungary
- Johan Tobias Sergel (1740–1814), Sweden
- Richard Serra (1938–2024), US
- Pablo Serrano (1908–1985), Spain
- Yvonne Serruys (1873–1953), Belgium/France
- Desiderio da Settignano (c. 1430–1464), Italy
- Aqjangajuk Shaa (1937–2019), Canada
- Ivan Shadr (1887–1941), Russia/Soviet Union
- Floyd Shaman (1935–2005), US
- Joel Shapiro (1941–2025), US
- Judith Shea (born 1948), US
- Oliver Sheppard (1865–1941), Ireland
- Izzy Sher (1912–1999), US
- Aleksandr Shevchenko (1882–1948), Ukraine
- Leonard and Kathleen Shillam (1915–2005 and 1916–2002), Australia
- Siona Shimshi (ציונה שמשי, 1939–2018), Israel
- Raphaele Shirley (born 1969), US
- Nikolay Shmatko (1943–2020), Ukraine
- Alyson Shotz (born 1964), US
- Fedot Shubin (1740–1805), Russia
- Vadim Sidur (1924–1986), Russia/Ukraine
- Robert William Sievier (1794–1865), England
- Nick Sikkuark (1943–2013), Canada
- Jeanne Silverthorne (born 1950), US
- Manuel Pereira da Silva (1920–2003), Portugal
- Sidney Simon (1917–1997), US
- Eugène Simonis (1810–1882), Belgium
- Alice Louise Judd Simpich (1918–2006), US
- Jane Simpson (born 1965), England
- Renée Sintenis (1888–1965), Germany
- John Sisko (1958–2016), US
- Lucas Sithole (1931–1994), South Africa
- Charlie Sivuarapik (1911–1968), Canada
- John Skeaping (1901–1980), England
- Marta Skulme (1890–1962), Latvia
- Blue Sky (born 1938), US
- Sean Slemon (born 1978), South Africa
- Claus Sluter (fl. 14th century), County of Holland
- Anthony Smith (born 1984), Scotland/England
- David Smith (1906–1965), US
- Kiki Smith (born 1954), US
- Tony Smith (1912–1980), US
- Kenneth Snelson (1927–2016), US
- M.L. Snowden, US
- Nikos Sofialakis (1914–2002), Greece
- Alexander Sokolov (born 1955), Spain
- Xul Solar (1887–1963), Argentina
- Povl Søndergaard (1905–1986), Denmark
- Monika Sosnowska (born 1972), Poland
- Pierre Soulages (1919–2022), France
- A. B. S. Sprigge (1906–1980), England
- Edward Caldwell Spruce (1865–1922), England
- Ralph Stackpole (1885–1973), US
- Pia Stadtbäumer (born 1959), Germany
- Richard Stankiewicz (1922–1983), US
- Charles van der Stappen (1843–1910), Belgium
- Jonny Star (born 1964), Germany
- Birgit Stauch (born 1961), Germany
- Karl Stauffer-Bern (1857–1891), Switzerland
- Emma Stebbins (1815–1882), US
- Florence Steele (1857–1948), England
- John Steell (1804–1891), Scotland
- Flora Steiger-Crawford (1899–1991), Switzerland
- Frank Stella (1936–2024), US
- Jana Sterbak (born 1955), Czechoslovakia/Canada
- David Watson Stevenson (1842–1904), Scotland
- William Grant Stevenson (1849–1919), Scotland
- Albert Stewart (1900–1965), US
- Johann Gustav Stockenberg (c. 1660 – c. 1710), Sweden/Estonia
- Jessica Stockholder (born 1959), US
- Alexander Stoddart (born 1959), Scotland
- Mark Stoddart (born 1960), Scotland
- Nicholas Stone (1586–1647), England
- Veit Stoss (1450–1533), Germany/Poland
- Renee Stout (born 1958), US
- Olivier Strebelle (1927–2017), Belgium
- Marjorie Strider (1931–2014), US
- Alajos Stróbl (1856–1926), Hungary
- Zsigmond Kisfaludi Strobl (1884–1975), Hungary
- Imogen Stuart (1927–2024), Germany/Ireland
- Michelle Stuart (born 1933), US
- Franz Stuck (1863–1928), Germany
- Rashit Suleymanov (born 1950), Soviet Union/Uzbekistan
- Emmet Sullivan (1887–1970), US
- George Sugarman (1912–1999), US
- James Surls (born 1943), US
- Mark di Suvero (born 1933), Italy/US
- Marc-Aurèle de Foy Suzor-Coté (1869–1937), Canada
- Bill Swan (1917–1984), US
- Frances Isobel Swan (1875–1941), England
- John Macallan Swan (1847–1910), England
- Roxanne Swentzell (born 1962), US
- Stephanie Syjuco (born 1974), Philippines
- Alina Szapocznikow (1926–1973), Poland
- Sarah Sze (born 1969), US
- Béla Szeift (1944–2012), Hungary
- Pierre Szekely (1923–2001), Hungary/France
- Katharina Szelinski-Singer (1918–2010), Germany
- István Szentgyörgyi (1881–1938), Hungary
- László Szlávics, Jr. (born 1959), Hungary
- Stanisław Szukalski (1893–1987), Poland

== T ==
- Athena Tacha (born 1936), Greece
- Sophie Taeuber-Arp (1889–1943), Switzerland
- Lorado Taft (1860–1936), US
- Shinkichi Tajiri (1923–2009), US/Netherlands
- Hiroatsu Takata (1900–1987), Japanese sculptor and essayist
- Simone di Francesco Talenti (c. 1300–1369), Italy
- Joe Talirunili (ca. 1893–1976), Canada
- Parviz Tanavoli (born 1937), Iran/Canada
- Endel Taniloo (1923–2019), Estonia
- Dorothea Tanning (1910–2012), US
- Lucy Tasseor Tutsweetok (1934–2012), Canada
- Vladimir Tatlin, (1885–1953), Russia/Ukraine
- Waldine Tauch (1892–1986), US
- Henry Tayali (1943–1987), Northern Rhodesia/Zambia
- Alasdair Grant Taylor (1934–2007), Scotland
- Pam Taylor (1929–2014), Wales
- Robert Taylor (1714–1788), England
- Piotr Tayozhny (1887–1952), Russia/Soviet Union
- Rory Te´ Tigo (born 1951), Germany/Wales
- TEJN (born 1976), Denmark
- Eduard Telcs (1872–1948), Hungary/Austria
- Nalenik Temela (1939–2003), Canada
- Allie Tennant (1892 or 1898–1971), US
- John Ternouth (1796–1848), England
- Jean-Pierre-Antoine Tassaert (1727–1788), Southern Netherlands
- James Thom (1802–1850), Scotland
- Margaret Thomas (1842–1929), England/Australia
- Robert Thomas (1926–1999), Wales
- Diana Thomson (born 1939), England
- Josef Thorak (1889–1952), Austria/Germany
- Þorbjörg Pálsdóttir (1919–2009), Iceland
- Alan Thornhill (1921–2020), England
- Hamo Thornycroft (1850–1925), England
- Bertel Thorvaldsen (1770–1844), Denmark
- Thomas Thurlow (1813–1899), England
- Pellegrino Tibaldi (1527–1596), Italy
- Alfred Tibor (1920–2017), Hungary/Israel
- John Tiktak (1916–1981), Canada
- Douglas Tilden (1860–1935), US
- Gary Tillery (born 1947), US
- Rebecca Tobey (born 1948), US
- Todor Todorov (born 1951), Bulgaria
- Albert Toft (1862–1949), England
- Tim Tolkien (born 1962), England
- Michael Tom (1946–1999), US
- Michael Tombros (1889–1974), Greece
- Simon Tookoome (1934–2010), Canada
- Murat Toptani (1867–1918), Ottoman Empire/Albania
- Camillo Torreggiani (1820–1896), Italy
- Fred Torrey (1884–1967), US
- Mabel Landrum Torrey (1886–1974), US
- Amy Toscani (born 1963), US
- Amerigo Tot (1909–1984), Hungary/Italy
- Peter Wolf Toth (born 1947), Hungary/US
- Elisabeth Toubro (born 1956), Denmark
- Pierre Toutain-Dorbec (born 1951), France/US
- Niccolò Tribolo (c. 1500–1550), Italy
- Aert van Tricht (15th/16th century), Netherlands
- Rosemarie Trockel (born 1952), Germany
- Zoja Trofimiuk (born 1952), Czechoslovakia/Australia
- Prince Paul Troubetzkoy (1866–1938), Russia/England
- Anne Truitt (1921–2004), US
- Su-Mei Tse (born 1973), Luxembourg
- Zurab Tsereteli (born 1934), Soviet Union/Russia
- Tom Tsuchiya (born 1972), US
- Akesuk Tudlik (1890–1966), Canada
- Joseph Tuerlinckx (1809–1873), Belgium
- Mark Tungilik (c. 1913–1986), Canada
- Susanne Tunn (born 1958), Germany
- Alison Turnbull (born 1956), Colombia/England
- Paula Mary Turnbull (1921–2018), US
- Alfred Turner (1874–1940), England
- Laurits Tuxen (1853–1927), Denmark
- Heather Tweed (born 1959), England

== U ==
- Raoul Ubac (1910–1985), France
- Marija Ujević-Galetović (1933–2023), Yugoslavia/Croatia
- Judas Ullulaq (1937–1999), Canada
- Leon Underwood (1890–1975), England
- Natar Ungalaaq (born 1959), Canada
- Hema Upadhyay (1972–2015), India
- Francis Upritchard (born 1976), New Zealand
- Ingunn Utsi (born 1948), Norway (Sami)
- Einar Utzon-Frank (1888–1955), Denmark
- Benoît Van Uytvanck (1857–1927), Belgium

== V ==
- Lefteris Valakas (1944–1982), Greece
- Edward Virginius Valentine (1838–1930), US
- Marja Vallila (1950–2018), US
- Maksimilijan Vanka (1889–1963), Austria–Hungary/Yugoslavia
- Ferenc Varga (1906–1989)
- Frank Varga (1943–2018), US
- Imre Varga (1923–2019), Hungary
- Josefina de Vasconcellos (1904–2005), England
- Cydra Vaux (1962–2013), US
- Alonso Vázquez (1565 – c. 1608), Spain
- Romolo Venucci (1903–1976), Italy
- Geo Verbanck (1881–1961), Belgium
- Theodoor Verhaegen (1700–1759), Southern Netherlands
- Andrea del Verrocchio (c. 1435–1488), Italy
- Aleš Veselý (1935–2015), Czechoslovakia/Czech Republic
- Benjamin Victor (born 1979), US
- Mary Vieira (1927–2001), Brazil
- Gustav Vigeland (1869–1943), Norway
- Paul de Vigne (1843–1901), Belgium
- Edgar Viies (1931–2006), Estonia
- Erna Viitol (1920–2001), Estonia
- Carole Vincent (1939–2019), England
- Antoine de Vinck (1924–1992), Belgium/France
- Fernando Villapol (born 1953), Spain
- Thomas Vinçotte (1850–1925), Belgium
- Paul Vincze (1907–1994), Hungary/France
- Romano Vio (1913–1984), Italy
- Bessie Potter Vonnoh (1872–1955), US
- Wolf Vostell (1932–1998), Germany
- Peter Voulkos (1924–2002), US
- Vince Vozzo (born 1954), Australia
- Franjo Vranjanin (c. 1430–1502), Venetian Dalmatia
- Jan Frans De Vriendt (1829–1919), Belgium
- Adriaen de Vries (c. 1556–1626), Netherlands/Bohemia
- Mikhail Vrubel (1856–1910), Russia
- Yevgeny Vuchetich (1908–1974), Soviet Union/Ukraine

== W ==
- Edward Wagner (1855–1922), US
- Nándor Wagner (1922–1997), Romania/Japan
- Elias Wakan (born 1945), Canada
- Sylvia Wald (1915–2011), US
- Isabelle Waldberg (1911–1990), Switzerland/France
- Hilda Annetta Walker (1877–1960), England
- Nellie Walker (1874–1973), US
- André Wallace (born 1947), England
- Ottilie Maclaren Wallace (1875–1947), Scotland
- Thomas Wilkinson Wallis (1821–1903), England
- Cecile Walton (1891–1956), Scotland
- Wang Henei (1912–2000), China
- Edmund Ware (1883–1960), England
- Marijke van Warmerdam (born 1959), Netherlands
- Olin Levi Warner (1844–1896), US
- Charles Waterhouse (1924–2013), US
- Mary Spencer Watson (1913–2006), England
- Musgrave Watson (1804–1847), England
- Samuel Watson (1662–1715), England
- George Frederic Watts (1817–1904), England
- József Lénárd Wéber (1702–1773), Hungary
- Henry Weekes (1807–1877), England
- Katharine Lane Weems, (1899–1989), US
- Albert Wein (1915–1991), US
- Adolph Alexander Weinman (1870–1952), Germany/US
- Felix de Weldon (1907–2003), Austria/US
- Julia Bracken Wendt (1870–1942), US
- Jan de Weryha-Wysoczański (born 1950), Poland
- Tom Wesselmann (1931–2004), US
- Franz West (1947–2012), Austria
- Clara Westhoff (1875–1954), Germany
- Richard Westmacott (1747–1808), England
- Robert White (1921–2002), US
- Rachel Whiteread (born 1963), England
- Anne Whitney (1821–1915), US
- Gertrude Vanderbilt Whitney (1875–1942), US
- Graem Whyte (born 20th century), US
- Steven Whyte (born 1969), England/US
- Antoine Wiertz (1806–1865), Belgium
- Cornélie Caroline van Asch van Wijck (1900–1932), Netherlands
- Marguerite Wildenhain (1896–1985), France/US
- Alison Wilding (born 1948), England
- Hannah Wilke (1940–1993), US
- Cathy Wilkes (born 1966), Northern Ireland/Scotland
- Lucy Gwendolen Williams (1870–1955), England
- Brian Willsher (1930–2010), England
- Jens Ferdinand Willumsen (1863–1958), Denmark
- Christopher Wilmarth (1943–1987), US
- Anne Wilson (born 1949), US
- Shane Wilson (born 1961), Canada
- Joseph Wilton (1722–1803), England
- Hermione Wiltshire (born 1963), England
- Louis Wiltshire (born 1969), England
- Vladimir Winkler (1884–1956), Czechoslovakia
- Margaret Winser (1868–1944), England
- Jacqueline Winsor (1941–2024), Newfoundland/US
- Lilli Wislicenus (1872–1939), Germany
- Isaac Witkin (1936–2006), South Africa/US
- Elizabeth Wyn Wood (1901–1966), Canada
- Beulah Woodard (1895–1955), US
- William F. Woodington (1806–1893), England
- Bill Woodrow (born 1948), England
- Vincent Woropay (1951–2002), England
- Rik Wouters (1882–1916), Belgium
- Anton van Wouw (1862–1945), Netherlands/South Africa
- Elizabeth Wright (born 1964), England
- Patience Wright (1725–1786), American colonies/England
- Paul Wunderlich (1927–2010), Germany
- Matthew Cotes Wyatt (1777–1862), England
- Richard James Wyatt (1795–1850), England
- Florence Wyle (1881–1968), US/Canada
- George Wyllie (1921–2012), Scotland

== X ==
- Xenokrates of Sicyon (fl. c. 280 BC), Greece
- Sislej Xhafa (born 1970), Yugoslavia/Kosovo
- Helidon Xhixha (born 1970), Albania

== Y ==
- Enid Yandell (1870–1934), US
- Melanie Yazzie (born 1966), US
- Susan York (born 1951), US
- Emily Young (born 1951), England
- Mahonri Young (1877–1957), US
- Daisy Youngblood (born 1945), US
- Yue Minjun (岳敏君, born 1962), China

== Z ==
- Bruno Zach (1891–1945), Ukraine/Austria
- Ossip Zadkine (1890–1967), Russia
- Nexhmedin Zajmi (1916–1991), Albania
- György Zala (1858–1937), Hungary
- Kārlis Zāle (1888–1942), Latvia
- Harriet Zeitlin (born 1929), US
- August Zeller (1863–1918), US
- Wanxin Zhang (born 1961), China/US
- Oksana Zhnikrup (1931–1993), Ukraine
- Moshe Ziffer (1902–1989), Austria-Hungary/Israel
- Paula Zima (born 1953), US
- Andrea Zittel (born 1965), US
- George Julian Zolnay (1863–1949), Romania/US
- William Zorach (1887–1966), Russia/US
- Anders Zorn (1860–1920), Sweden
- Rudolf Züllich (1813–1890), Hungary/Egypt
- Francisco Zúñiga (1912–1998), Costa Rica/Mexico
- Astrid Zydower (1930–2005), England

== Lists of sculptors by nationality ==
- List of Albanian sculptors
- List of Azerbaijani sculptors
- List of Dutch sculptors
- List of Hungarian sculptors
- List of Polish sculptors
- List of Slovenian sculptors

== See also ==
- List of female sculptors
- List of sculptors in the Web Gallery of Art
- List of people by occupation
- List of woodcarvers
- List of woodturners
- Sculpture
