= Graem Whyte =

American sculptor and gallerist (born 20th century)

Graem Whyte (born 20th century) is an American sculptor and gallerist.

Whyte was born and raised in metropolitan Detroit and now lives in Hamtramck, Michigan.

== Art career ==
His career started in the field of architecture, later shifted to fine art, and now hybridizes both disciplines. His work uses a wide array of materials and often fuses architecture, mythology, and patterns of mathematics and nature with a wry sense of humor.

In 2007, Whyte and his wife, Faina Lerman, founded the experimental-art venue Popps Packing in Hamtramck. A later part of the Popps Packing project is Popps Emporium, an experimental storefront, community gallery, and social club using barter and time-based exchange.

Whyte's Squash House project involved the conversion of an abandoned house in Detroit into a squash court and community squash garden.

Whyte exhibited at the CUE Art Foundation, a gallery in New York City, in 2014. His public sculpture Memory Field, a collaboration with his wife, is installed in Detroit's Calimera Park.

== See also ==
- List of American artists
- List of people from Detroit
- List of sculptors
