= Achille Salata =

Italian sculptor

Achille Salata was a 19th-century Italian sculptor.

He was born in Ostiglia and lived in Milan. In 1880, he exhibited at the fourth National Exposition of Fine Arts in Turin: La pesca galante (bronze), Young Shakespeare (marble), and Portrait of the Mother (marble). The latter was also exhibited the next year at the Exposition of Milan. In the 1883 Milan exposition, he exhibited three bronzes: The indiscretion, Lo spavaldo, and The sweetness; and two terra cotta La Massaia and La questua. He also exhibited in the 1883 Rome Exposition of Fine Arts, the statues La Merveilleuse and Lo spavento. Lo spavaldo and L' indiscrezione, bronze statuettes were exhibited in Milan, in 1884. In 1886 in Livorno, he exhibited a bronze statuette titled Acqua di Seltz; and in the next year to the National Artistic Exposition of Venice, he sent a bronze statuette titled L'orgoglio and Vezzosetta. In 1877, he exhibited a Genio di Napoleone at the Brera exposition. He is represented at the Modern Art Gallery of Milan by an 1884 bronze Guardaportone (Gatekeeper) He completed a funereal Monument to Wilhelmo Braghirolli, Abbot in Mirandola (1884).
