= Louis Wiltshire =

British sculptor (born 1969)

Louis Wiltshire (born 23 April 1969) is a British sculptor.

== Life and work ==
Wiltshire began his career by setting up his own Art Studio in 1988, employing a team of artists to create unique figurative works, including fine figurative work for Wedgwood potteries, figurative work for BBC Television portraying the work of artist Quentin Blake and Roald Dahl, and head portrait work for Spitting Image. Notable commissions for conceptual artists included Gavin Turk and Tim Noble and Sue Webster.

As the Senior Principal Sculptor at Madame Tussauds, Wiltshire was responsible for overseeing the creation of all Madame Tussauds wax figures. Some of his best known portraits include Catherine, Duchess of Cambridge, Colin Firth and Lady Gaga. He joined the company in 1997 as a figurative clay sculptor and left the company in November 2014. Since 2014 he has worked in the film industry as a creature/ character sculptor and designer and his work can be seen in Star Wars: The Last Jedi, Solo: A Star Wars Story, and The Rise of Skywalker as well as Isle of Dogs.
