= Hippolyte Montillie =

French sculptor

Hippolyte Montillie was a late 19th and early 20th century deaf French sculptor.

Montillie was born in Moulin, France, and earned a degree from the Pereire School for the Deaf in Paris, remaining active thereafter in Paris. His most important works are a set of decorative figures on the Pont Alexandre III, and a bronze statue entitled L'Honneur dominant la Discords on the cornice of the Grand Palais.

He moved to the United States around 1900, where he worked in the studio of Karl Bilter, producing sculptures and decorative works for the Pan-American and South Carolina Expositions of 1901, and the Louisiana Purchase Exposition of 1904.
