= Jérôme Btesh =

French artist

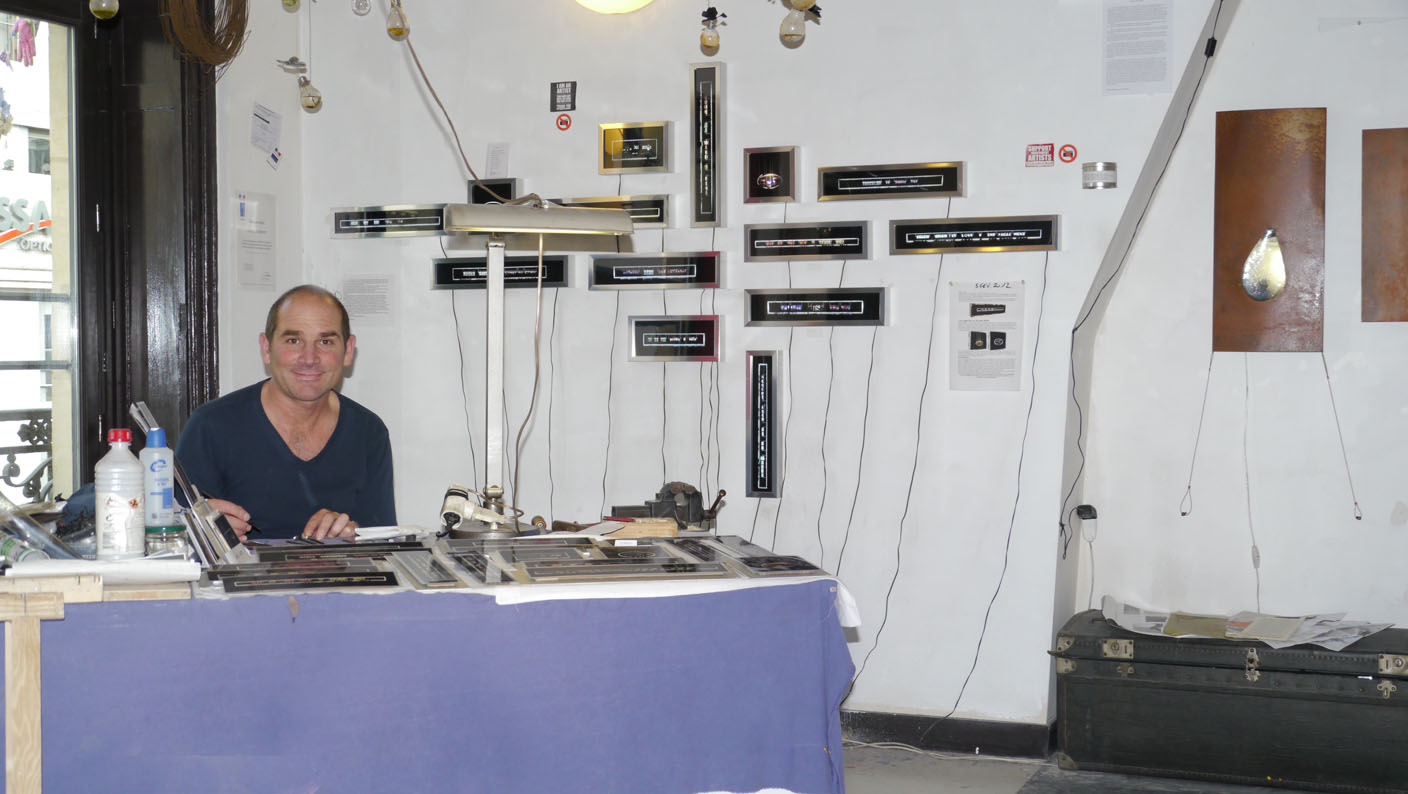
- Jerome Btesh in his Paris (France) atelier in 2013
- Born: Jerome Btesh; 1968 (age 57–58)
- Known for: Sculpture
- Movement: Industrial

Jerome Btesh (1968) is a French artist born in the sixties and living in Paris, France. He uses waste material such as metal, glass, industrial pieces and transform them within a common point, the light working.

== Artistic approach ==
Since 2001, he has developed a world of "art prototypes" which he called "matrix" (in the typographic meaning) and "light box" (as a kind of clone or slave from the matrix). For its "matrix", it creates from a thick plate bent on a steel frame, etched by acid and then interpreted, as a case. In addition, one or more rollers molten glass let appears a photographic image, created exclusively for each work. Moving to or around this piece of art, a mirror can shows a reflected view of suspended metallic prints, composing a word, a sentence, an alliteration.

His Light Boxes or "caissons lumineux" are made in square blocks or long metallic rectangular units in chrome steel or brushed stainless steel. Transparent and illuminated from the inside photographs are enclosed, figuring the typographic reflection of its "matrix".

About his artistic approach, he said: "My creation axis revolve around industrial techniques I turn from their functionality and profitability to put at the service of liberty and free (of charge) - it serves no purpose in appearance - and thus, materialize a philosophical theme". He get involved with other international artists causes, including for the ephemeral movement "greedy bastards" to complain about the excesses of the Jérôme Kerviel affair, in February 2011.

Introducing himself as a "citizen of the world", he exhibited in 16 countries, he participated in several collective artists movements, especially around humanist values and criticism. In 2012, a documentary was dedicated to him, directed by Scotto Production in the "Gueules d'art" ("Faces of Art") series.

== Some of his main exhibitions ==
- 2007 Art Paris Art Fair, « Artists4Life » at the Grand Palais (Paris).
- 2008 Galerie Nivet-Carzon (Paris)
- 2009 Davis Museum (Lisboa, Portugal)
- 2009 Art Paris Grand Palais (Paris)
- 2010 Slick Art Fair, at Le 104 (Paris)
- 2011 Galerie Chic Art Fair (Paris)
- 2011 Espace Saint Germain, Pierre Kleinmann gallery (Paris)
- 2012 Artcurial, « Les écoles de l’espoir » (Paris)
- 2012 Laetitia de Caritat gallery (Bruxelles, Belgium)
- 2013 « Carré sur Seine », Contemporain Art exhibition in Boulogne Billancourt (France)
- 2013 Jane Griffiths gallery (Val d'Isère, France)
- 2013 Le 13bis Art Centre, exhibition (La Seyne sur Mer, France)
