= Serhii Brylov =

Ukrainian artist (born 1974)

- Born: Serhii Volodymyrovych Brylov; April 5, 1974 (age 52); Kyiv, Ukraine
- Education: National Academy of Fine Arts and Architecture
- Known for: Sculptor
- Website: brylov.wixsite.com/serg

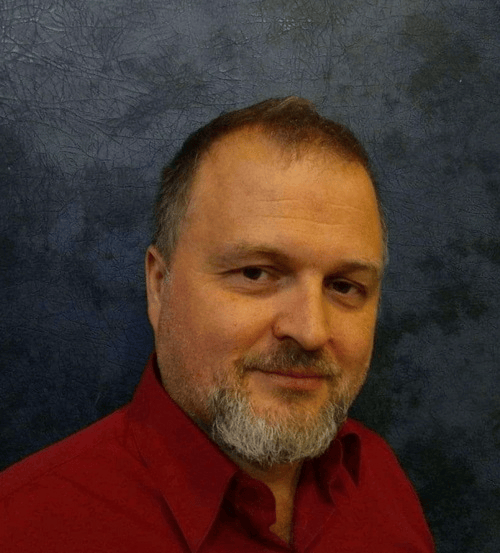
Brylov Serhii

Brylov Serhii Volodymyrovych (born April 5, 1974, in Kyiv, Ukraine) is a Ukrainian sculptor, teacher.

== Biography ==
=== Education ===
- 1986-1992 Taras Shevchenko Republican Art School
- 1992-1998 National Academy of Fine Arts and Architecture B.A. Sculpture
- 1998-2001 National Academy of Fine Arts and Architecture M.A. Sculpture
- 1995 Member of Kyiv Organization Youth Assotiation of the National Union of Artists of Ukraine
- 2000 Member of the National Union of Artists of Ukraine

=== Exhibitions ===
- 1993-2021 All-Ukrainian Exhibitions, Central House of Artists, Kiev
- 1993 Ukrainian Academy of Arts 75th Anniversary Art Exhibition, the Ukrainian House, Kyiv
- 1996 Christmas exhibition, Artist Gallery, Kyiv
- 1996 The Art of Youth, 36 Gallery, Kyiv
- 1996 The Art of Youth, Gallery of the Crimean Organization of the National Union of Artists of Ukraine, Yalta
- 1997 Harmony, 36 Gallery, Kyiv
- 1997 Youth Chooses Art, Artist Gallery, Kyiv
- 1997 L, K, B Solo Exhibition, Museum of Kyiv History, Kyiv
- 1998 Boys and Girls, Artist Gallery, Kyiv
- 1998 Enclosed in a Circle, Slavutych Gallery, Kyiv
- 1999 Ukrainian Sculpture Triennial, Central House of Artists, Kyiv
- 2000 3+2, Artist Gallery, Kyiv
- 2000 PRO ART Festival, the Ukrainian House, Kyiv
- 2002 Ukrainian Sculpture Triennial, Central House of Artists, Kyiv
- 2003 Solo Exhibition, Artist Gallery, Kyiv
- 2003 New Generation, Central House of Artists, Moscow
- 2005 Ukrainian Sculpture Triennial, Central House of Artists, Kyiv
- 2008 Ukrainian Sculpture Triennial, Central House of Artists, Kyiv
- 2011 Animalistic, Artist Gallery, Kyiv
- 2012-2013 The Art of Nations - II. The Exhibition of Commonwealth
- 2014 Solo Exhibition, Artist Gallery, Kyiv
- 2016 Color palette, Gallery Mitseva, Kiev
- 2016 POWER / Violence /Ruler, Hotel Adlon Berlin Germany
- 2020 Ukrainian Sculpture Triennial, Central House of Artists, Kyiv
- 2023 Ukrainian Sculpture Triennial, Central House of Artists, Kyiv
- 2024 – Major Art Exhibition Dedicated to the 100th Anniversary of the Founding of the Bila Tserkva Local History Museum.

* Altogether 4 Solo and 40 Group Exhibitions

=== Collections ===
Private collections in the United States, Denmark, South Korea, Germany, Austria, Canada, Switzerland, Russia Valentina Tereshkova collection Museum of Kyiv History (Kyiv) Regional Natural History Museum (Vyshhorod)

=== Work ===
- 2011-2017 Kyiv State Mykhailo Boychuk Institute of decorative arts and design, Drawing Department, lecturer
- 2017-2019 Senior Lecturer at the Kyiv National University of Technology and Design, Department of Drawing and Painting * 2009- 2012 Head of Kyiv Organization Youth Assotiation of the National Union of Artists of Ukraine
- 2010-2013 Deputy Head of Kyiv Organization of the National Union of Artists of Ukraine
- 2021-2022 Deputy Head of the National Union of Artists of Ukraine
- 2023 - Senior Lecturer at Borys Grinchenko Kyiv Metropolitan University, Department of Design

== Honors ==
- 2002 Certificate of Commendation of Chief Department for Arts and Culture of Kiev City State Administration
- 2003 Certificate of Commendation of Minister of Culture of Ukraine for personal contribution to the Development of Ukrainian Art
- 2011 Certificate for Assistance in charity event "I'll live", All-Ukrainian non-governmental organization "Association for Support of Disabled People and patients with CLL"
- 2012 Certificate for highly appreciated social work on raising educational background of Adults of Ukraine and the development of spiritual and intellectual potential of Ukrainian Society and the Ukrainian State.

National Academy of Pedagogical Sciences of Ukraine, All-Ukrainian Bureau "Education of Adults of Ukraine", The UNESCO International Institute for Lifelong Learning

- 2017 Diploma of the National Union of Artists of Ukraine for a significant personal contribution to the development of Ukrainian fine arts, high professionalism, multi-year creative and pedagogical activity. * 2019- Acknowledgment "For high-quality fruitful activity and asceticism in the field of culture and art. III International Multi-genre Festival of Arts" Magical Melodies ", personal contribution to the development of the world festival movement in Ukraine, active and professional work in the jury of the international festival.
- 2019- Acknowledgment "For professional self-explanatory work as part of the commission (jury) of the All-Ukrainian project" JUST FALSE "in 2019."
- 2020 - Honorary award of the National Academy of Fine Arts and Architecture
- 2020 - Diploma for the active community position for the expansion in the Ukrainian suspension of the sea idea and the renewal of Ukraine in the status of the sea power and for the fate of the project "Expedition 2020", the contest for a child child about the sea "Sea"
- 2024 – A Certificate of Appreciation for Participation in the District Drawing Contest "Pencil and Paintbrush Gather Friends" in Kyiv.

== Sources ==
=== Official sources ===
Prjadko V. "Brylov Serhii Volodymyrovych" – Encyclopedia of Modern Ukraine (in Ukrainian)

- Faculty page at the Department of Design, Borys Grinchenko Kyiv University
- University wiki profile (in Ukrainian)
- Official artist website
- List of publications

=== Academic profiles ===
- Google Scholar
- ORCID
- Web of Science

=== Media and publications ===
- "Testimonies of Ukrainian Artists During the War" – Artmajeur Magazine
