= Dorit Schwartz =

Israeli-American sculptor

Dorit Schwartz is an Israeli-born American contemporary sculptor in Las Vegas, Nevada. Her artwork combines reclaimed wood, crystal, marble, and light to create abstract sculptures that explore themes of nature, healing, and spirituality.

== Biography ==
=== Early life and education ===
Schwartz was born in Israel and studied fine arts at the Wizo Art School in Tel Aviv. At the age of 17, she moved to Los Angeles, California, where she continued to study sculpture before settling in Las Vegas, Nevada.

=== Career ===
Schwartz began her career working with clay and marble before developing a style that combines reclaimed acacia wood, crystals, and stone. Her work highlights the balance between natural materials and modern design.

In 2008, she became the resident artist for the St. Jude Children's Research Hospital, Las Vegas Chapter, where she created the Celebration of Life series inspired by healing and renewal. Sculptures from this series are displayed in public locations such as the Discovery Children's Museum, the Lou Ruvo Center for Brain Health, Downtown Summerlin, Summerlin Hospital, the University of Nevada, Las Vegas (UNLV), Las Vegas City Hall, and Symphony Park at The Smith Center. The same year, she co-founded the local chapter of St. Jude Children's Research Hospital with friend Tanya Amid.

Her later series includes The Light Within, which incorporates built-in lighting, and Light of Kabbalah, featuring hand-carved selenite engraved with symbols from The 72 Names of God.

Schwartz's work has been covered by several publications, including the Las Vegas Review-Journal, Business Press Vegas, KTNV 13 News, Chic Compass Magazine, and CanvasRebel. Articles about her include “Talent Set in Stone” (2014), “Local Artist Showcases Work at Ascaya” (2016), and “Sculptor Dorit Schwartz on Art, Hikes and Sushi” (2016).

=== Artistic style ===
Schwartz's artistic process involves personally sourcing and shaping materials, including hand-carved reclaimed woods such as acacia, teak, rosewood, burl maple, mahogany, and suar wood. These woods are combined with minerals including quartz, selenite, agate, apophyllite, stilbite, malachite, and Moroccan kyanite, as well as other natural stones. Her work balances raw surfaces and refined finishes, and intentionally positions wood as a grounding form and the stone or light element as the visual focal point. Light is an important element in her art, symbolizing balance and energy.

=== Public installations ===
Schwartz's sculptures are displayed in public and cultural locations throughout Las Vegas, including:

- Discovery Children's Museum
- Lou Ruvo Center for Brain Health
- Downtown Summerlin
- Summerlin Hospital
- University of Nevada, Las Vegas (UNLV)
- Las Vegas City Hall (Mayor's Office)
- Symphony Park at The Smith Center

=== Selected exhibitions ===
- Celebration of Life — St. Jude Children's Research Hospital, Las Vegas (2014–present)
- The Light Within — Wynn Home Store at Encore Esplanade (2016)
- Essence at Ascaya — Ascaya Luxury Living, Henderson (2016)
- Expressions — Virga Fine Art Gallery, Laguna Beach (2017)
- William Carr Gallery — Palazzo Las Vegas (2017)
- Partnership to Gallery residency (2025)

== Recognitions ==
- Resident Artist, St. Jude Children's Research Hospital – Las Vegas Chapter (2008–present)
- Featured Sculptor, Ascaya “Art in Architecture” Showcase (2016)
- White House Recognition — Created selenite awards for officials, including Nikki Haley; received acknowledgement from Ivanka Trump (January 2020).
- Pre-Qualified Sculptor, City of Las Vegas Cultural Affairs Public Art Program (2024)

== Personal life ==
Schwartz regularly practices yoga and meditation. She lives with her husband in Summerlin's Eagle Hills, and has participated in community and philanthropic activities, including collaborations with cultural institutions and nonprofits in Southern Nevada.
