= Paniluk Qamanirq =

Inuk artist

Paniluk Qamanirq (born 1935) is an Inuk artist known for her stone sculpture. She lives in Arctic Bay, Nunavut.

Her work is included in the collections of the National Gallery of Canada and the Winnipeg Art Gallery.
