= Léonard De Cuyper =

Belgian sculptor

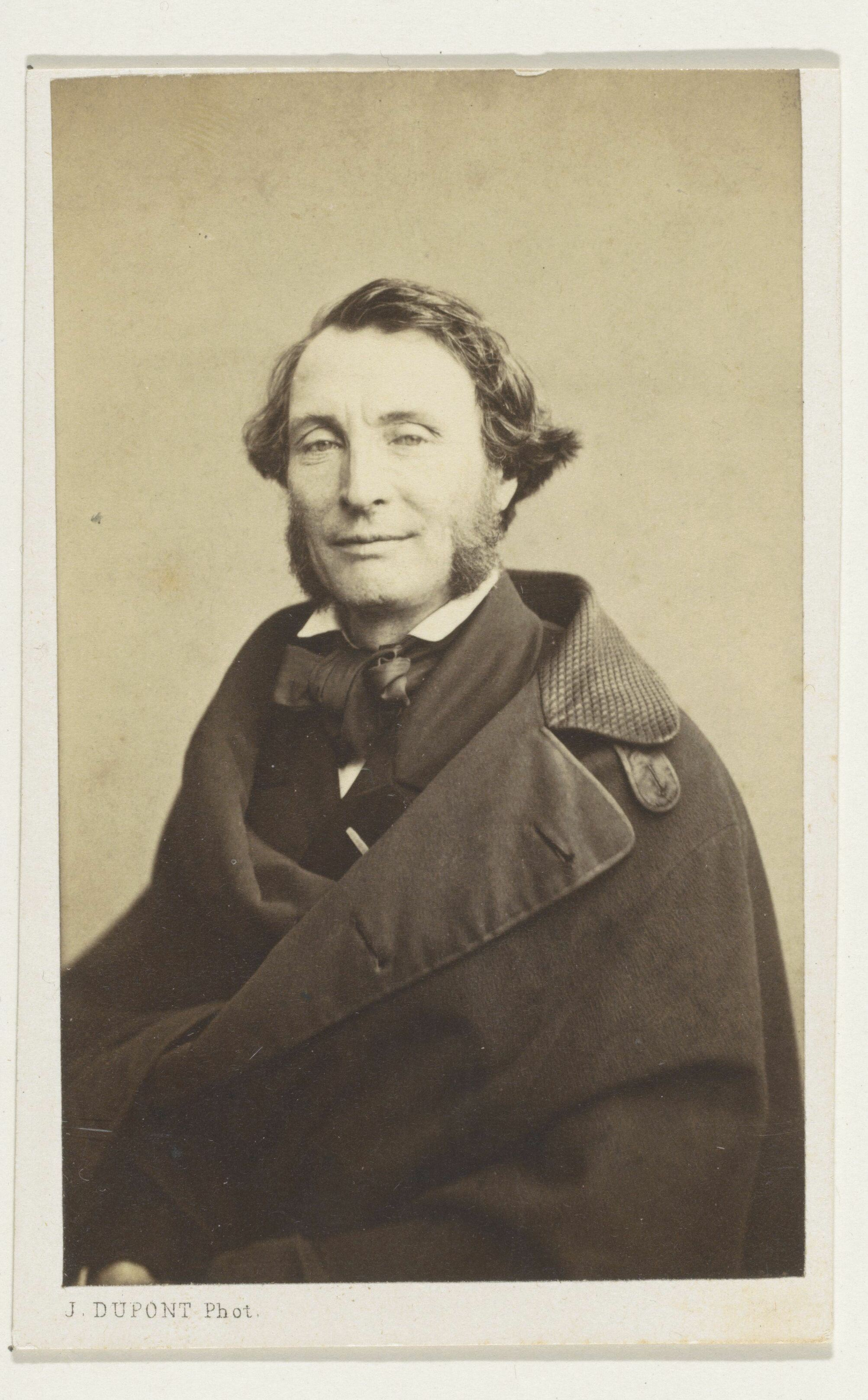
Léonard De Cuyper

Léonard De Cuyper (1 January 1813 – 18 February 1870) was a Belgian sculptor.

== Biography ==
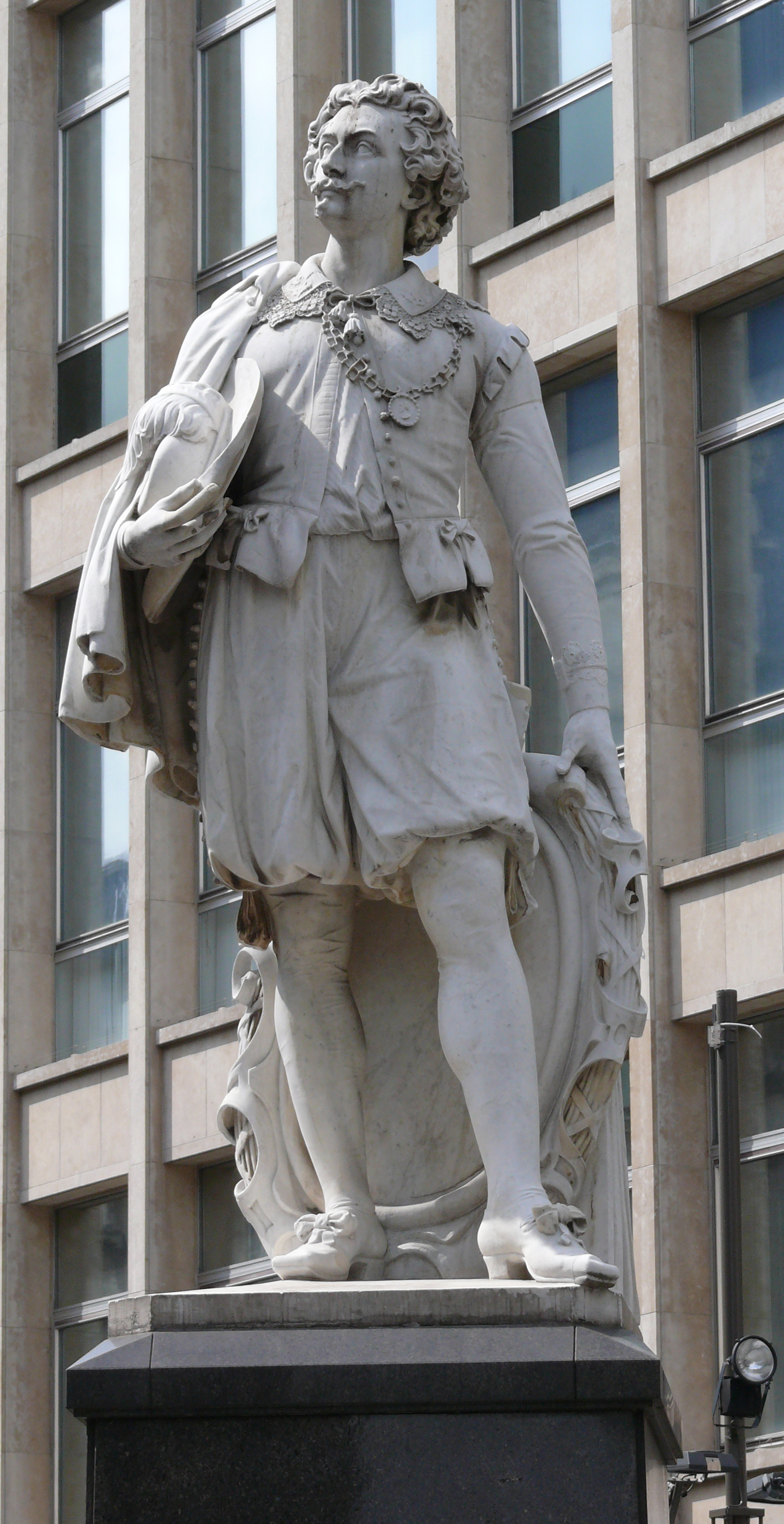
Anthony van Dyck, Antwerp

De Cuyper, the youngest brother of three sculptors, was born in Antwerp on 1 January 1813. He was a student of his brother Jean-Baptiste De Cuyper. He continued his studies at the Academy in Antwerp. He was a sculptor at the Russian Court for some time. Back in Belgium, he had the Cuypershof residence with a detached studio built in Klein-Antwerpen (the house was demolished in 1928 and replaced by a new building. Today Résidence Isabelle stands there). In 1854 the Kunstverbond was founded under Cuypers' leadership, which was later also called the Nederlandsch Kunstverbond to distinguish it from the French-speaking Cercle Artistique.
