= Hendrik Peeters =

Belgian sculptor

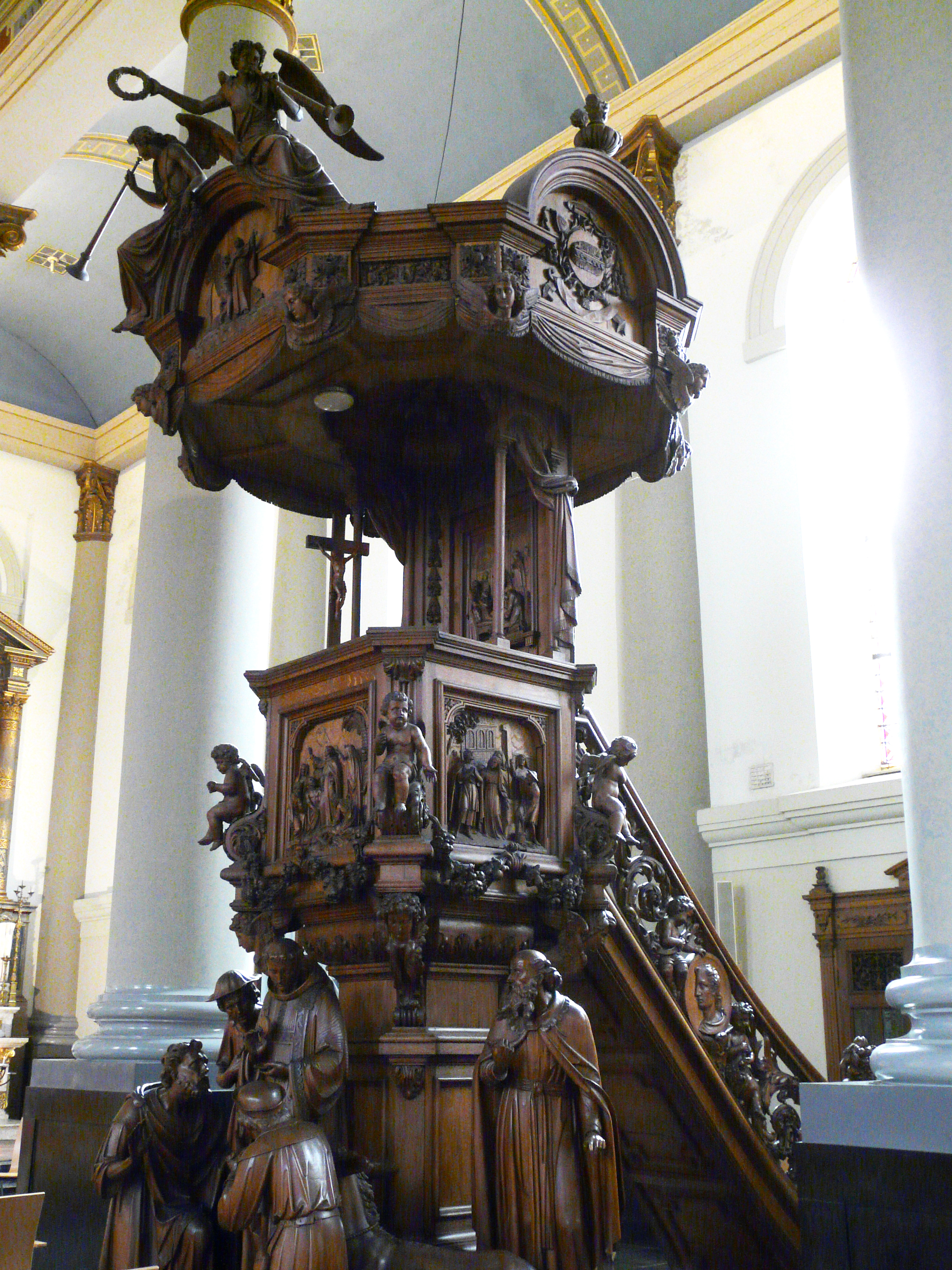
Pulpit of St. Anthony of Padua Cathedral, Breda

Hendrik Peeters (19 April 1815 – 29 June 1869) was a Belgian sculptor. He was the co-founder of the workshop Hendrik Peeters-Divoort.

== Biography ==
Hendrik Peeters was born in Turnhout on 19 April 1815. He was the son of Louis Peeters and his second wife Anna Catharina Peeters. His father supported the family as a weaver and died in 1818, when Hendrik was only 3 years old.

Many prominent figures in the field of architecture, sculpture and painting studied at the Academy in Antwerp at the time, and this was also the case for Hendrik. He was registered there from 1832, that is, at the age of 17, and stayed there until 1838. During his stay in Antwerp he is said to have lived in two different places in the Blindestraat, and finally in the Leguit (Schipperskwartier). He is said to have been apprenticed to sculptor Jacob Van der Neer in Antwerp or at least visited his studio several times. It is possible that Van der Neer's wife had a family connection with Hendrik's parents.

On 26 January 1819 he married Antwerp Maria Joanna Divoort, and from this marriage the first of eight children was born in 1839. Later that year Peeters returned to Turnhout, where he founded a workshop for sculptors in the Korte Begijnenstraat. His brother-in-law Pierre Joseph Divoort also joined his workshop, though his role is not clear. From the beginning, the sculpting workshop was given the name Hendrik Peeters-Divoort, a reference to his brother-in-law. The workshop flourished very quickly, acquiring many customers (both in Belgium and the Netherlands). Its success also served as an inspiration for others, leading to the local establishment of several workshops: Pieter Pauwel De Meyer's, Napoleon Daems's (both students of Peeters), Josephus Marijnen's, and others.

After more than 26 years of activity in Turnhout, the family moved again to the Leguit in Antwerp on 26 March 1866. Peeters continued his workshop there, but not for long as he died three years later, aged 54. However, the workshop didn't end then, as it was thereafter ran by his son Pietje Peeters with the help of the latter's uncle Pierre Joseph Divoort.

== Gallery ==
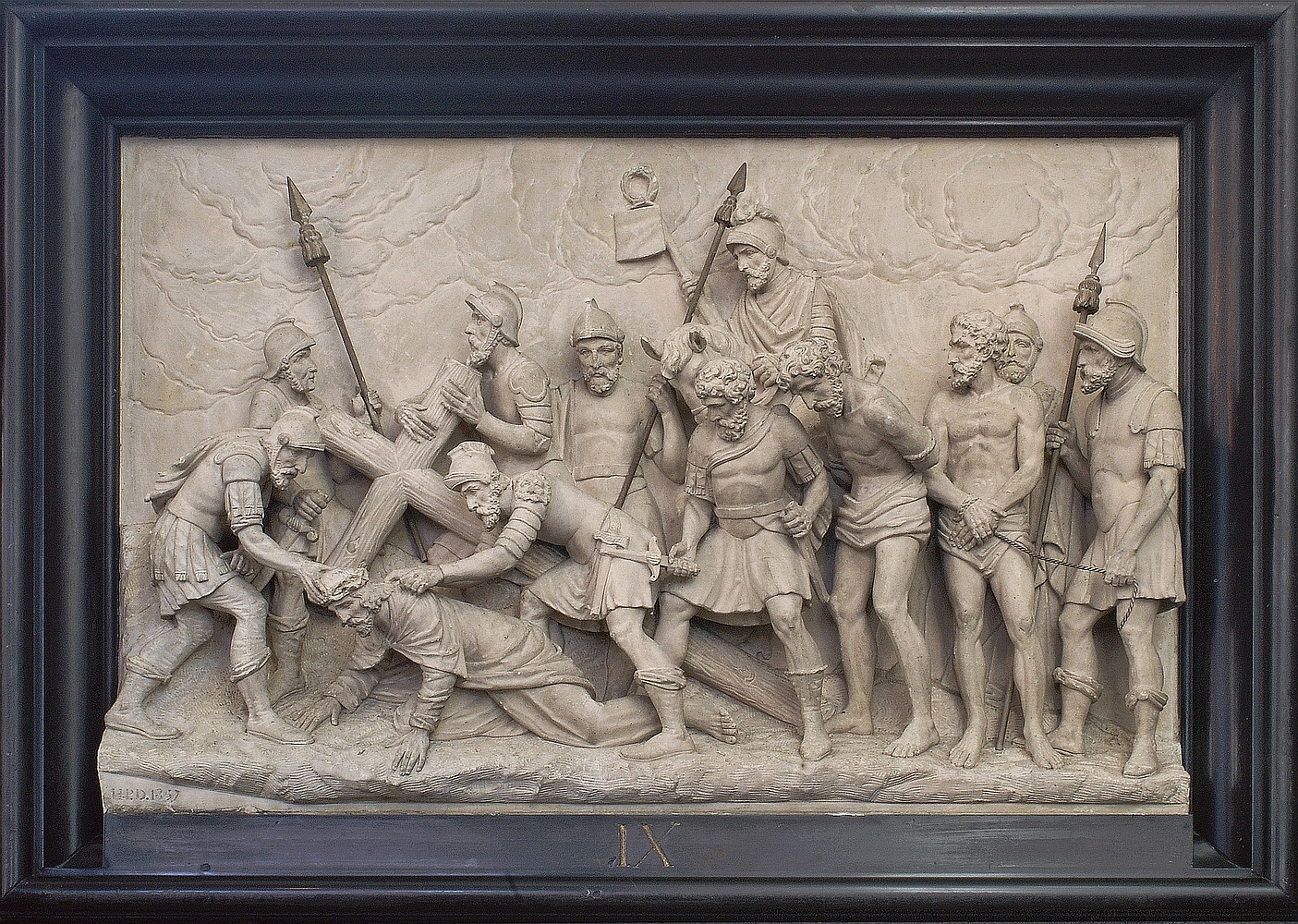
Detail of the Way of the Cross in the Sint-Pieterskerk of Turnhout

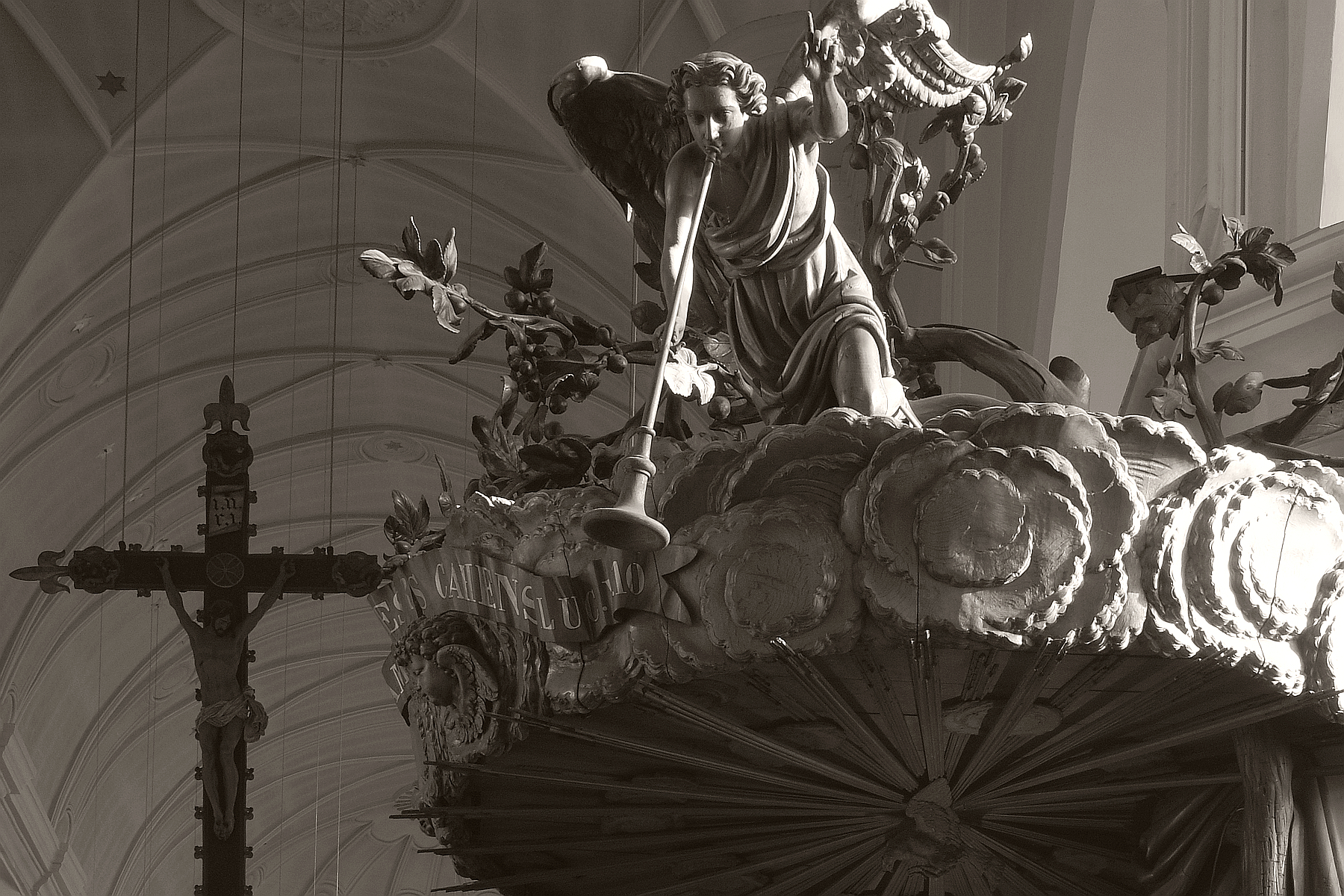
Detail of the pulpit in the Sint-Pieterskerk of Turnhout

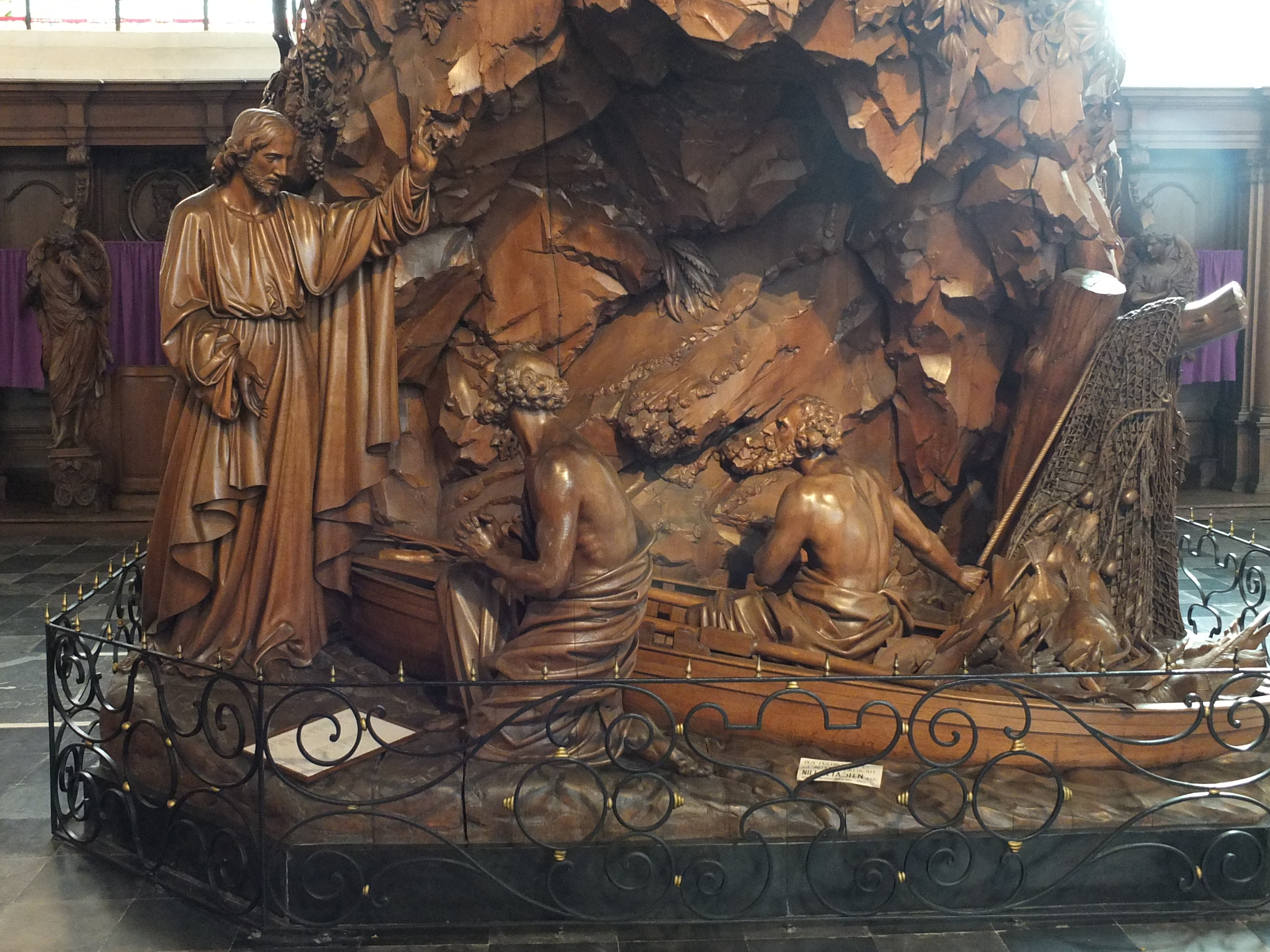
Detail of the pulpit in the Sint-Pieterskerk of Turnhout
