= Franz Rosei =

Austrian sculptor and draughtsman (born 1947)

- Born: 2 July 1947 (age 79)
- Occupations: Sculptor and draughtsman

Franz Rosei (born 2 July 1947 in Vienna) is an Austrian sculptor and draughtsman. His brother is the writer Peter Rosei.

== Biography ==
After completing high school in 1966, Franz Rosei started to work on wooden and gypsum sculptures. After a short stay at the University of Applied Arts of Vienna (Universität für angewandte Kunst – " die Angewandte "), where he followed lessons with Prof. Leinfellner, he worked independently again. He produced a few sculptures with the concrete casting technique. As from 1970 he worked primarily with stone (marble, limestone, sandstone) and with some drawings (pencil, charcoal, watercolor). In 1985 Rosei began working in bronze.

The works of Franz Rosei have been displayed for over 30 years in many exhibitions in Austria and abroad (Germany, United States, Italy, France and Switzerland).

Rosei's main topic is a vision on this life and world, and the wish to bring onto shape the outcome of such observation and such thinking.

== Exhibitions ==
=== Individual exhibitions (selection) ===
- Künstlerhaus, Vienna, 1976
- Galerie Schapira & Beck, Vienna, 1977
- Galerie Orny, Munich, 1978
- Künstlerhaus, Salzburg, 1979
- Künstlerhaus, Klagenfurt, 1979
- In the context of the "Sonderschau Österreich", 1980
- During the "Kunstmesse Basel" in the context of the "Biennale des Jeunes", Paris, 1980
- Künstlerhaus, Vienna, 1980
- Galerie Droschl, Graz, 1981
- Galerie Welz, Salzburg, 1982
- Galerie Würthle, Vienna, 1983
- Museum moderner Kunst/Museum des 20. Jahrhunderts, Vienna, 1984
- Galerie Lendl, Graz, 1989
- Galerie Ulysses, Vienna, 1989
- Salzburger Landessammlungen Rupertinum, Salzburg, 1990
- Ulysses Gallery, New York, 1991
- Galerie im Taxispalais, Innsbruck, 1994
- Galerie Ulysses, Vienna, 1995
- Kulturhaus Graz, 2000
- Historisches Museum der Stadt Wien, 2001
- Galerie Ulysses, Vienna, 2001
- Künstlerhaus, Klagenfurt, 2003
- Galerie Arthouse, Bregenz, 2004
- Galerie Ulysses, Vienna, 2007

=== Participation to exhibitions (selection) ===
- " Steinzeit ", Tiroler Kunstpavillon, Innsbruck, 1986
- Museum moderner Kunst/Museum des 20. Jahrhunderts, Vienna, 1987
- " Wien – Vienna 1960–1990 ", Museum Moderner Kunst, Bolzano, 1989
- " Wien – Vienna 1960–1990 ", Palazzo della Permanente, Milan, 1990
- " Ursprung und Moderne ", Neue Galerie der Stadt Linz, Linz, 1990
- " La figura interiore ", Pordenone, 1991
- " Wotruba und die Folgen ", Museum Würth und BAWAG Foundation, Vienna, 1994
- " Skulpturengarten ", Galerie Poller, Frankfurt, 1996
- " Des Eisbergs Spitze ", Kunsthalle Wien, Vienna, 1998
- " Ein gemeinsamer Ort. Skulpturen, Plastiken, Objekte ", Lentos Museum Linz, 2006
- " Albrecht und Zeitgenossen, Positionen österreichischer Bildhauerei seit 1945 ", Künstlerhaus Bregenz, 2007

=== Works presented at official exhibitions ===
- Graphische Sammlung Albertina, Vienna
- Bundesministerium für Unterricht und Kunst (Artothek Wien)
- Salzburger Landessammlung Rupertinum, Salzburg
- Kulturamt der Stadt Wien
- Kulturamt der Stadt Linz
- Amt der niederösterreichischen Landesregierung
- Museum moderner Kunst, Vienna
- Lentos Kunstmuseum, Linz
- Wien Museum

== Publications ==
- Franz Rosei / Ernst Nowak, Steine / Felder, Gemini-Verlag, Berlin, 2003, 65 pp., ISBN 3-935978-19-7
- Peter Rosei (texts) and Franz Rosei (drawings), Entwurf für eine Welt ohne Menschen, Entwurf zu einer Reise ohne Ziel, Residenz Verlag, Salzburg, 1975, 164 pp., ISBN 3-7017-0125-3
- Peter Rosei and Franz Rosei, Ich glaube… in: Katalog Schapira & Beck, Vienna 1977
- Peter Rosei and Franz Rosei, Von der Arbeit…, in: Katalog Künstlerhaus Salzburg und Künstlerhaus Klagenfurt, 1979

== Bibliography ==
- Peter Baum, Ursprung und Moderne, Neue Galerie der Stadt Linz, 1990
- Otto Breicha, Österreich zum Beispiel, Residenz Verlag, Salzburg, 1983
- Otto Breicha, Franz Rosei, in: Wotruba und die Folgen, Österreichische Plastik seit 1945, Salzburger Landessammlungen Rupertinum, 1994
- Herbert Fidler, Sichtbare Spuren, Trend / Profil Verlag, Vienna, 1994
- Ines Höllwarth, Franz Rosei, in: Figur als Aufgabe, Aspekte der österreichischen Plastik nach 1945, Skulpturen und Arbeiten auf Papier, Salzburger Landessammlungen Rupertinum, 1989
- Giancarlo Pauletto, Franz Rosei, in: La figura interiore, edizioni d'arte – serie quadrata 53, 1991
- Max Peintner, Commentaire, in: catalogue of the XIth Biennale de Paris, 1980
- Peter Rosei, Zu den Skulpturen Franz Roseis, in: Katalog Galerie Ulysses, Vienna, 2007
- Peter Rosei, Diskurs der Muster, Anmerkungen zu einigen Figuren Franz Roseis, in: Parnass, Heft 3, Linz 1990, as well as in: Katalog Salzburger Landessammlungen Rupertinum, 1990
- Dieter Ronte, Der Torso als Befragung des Menschen oder von der Ganzheitlichkeit des non-finito, in: Franz Rosei, Skulpturen und Zeichnungen, Schriftenreihe des Museums moderner Kunst, n° 22, Vienna, 1984
- Max Peintner, Über drei Skulpturen Roseis, in: Franz Rosei, Skulpturen und Zeichnungen, Schriftenreihe des Museums moderner Kunst, n° 22, Vienna, 1984
- Peter Weiermair, Das direkte Behauen ist der wahre Weg in der Bildhauerei…, in: Katalog Steinzeit, Innsbruck, 1986
- Kristian Sotriffer, Wien – Vienna 1960–1990, Nuove edizioni Gabriele Mazzotta, Milan, 1989
- Sàrolta Schredl, Aspekte und Situationen im Werk Franz Roseis, in: Katalog Galerie im Taxispalais, Innsbruck, 1994
- Peter Weiermair, Beschädigte Klassizität: zu den Arbeiten des Bildhauers Franz Rosei, in: Franz Rosei, Skulpturen 1970 bis 2000, Katalog Historisches Museum der Stadt Wien, 2001
