= Sing Hoo =

Chinese-Canadian sculptor

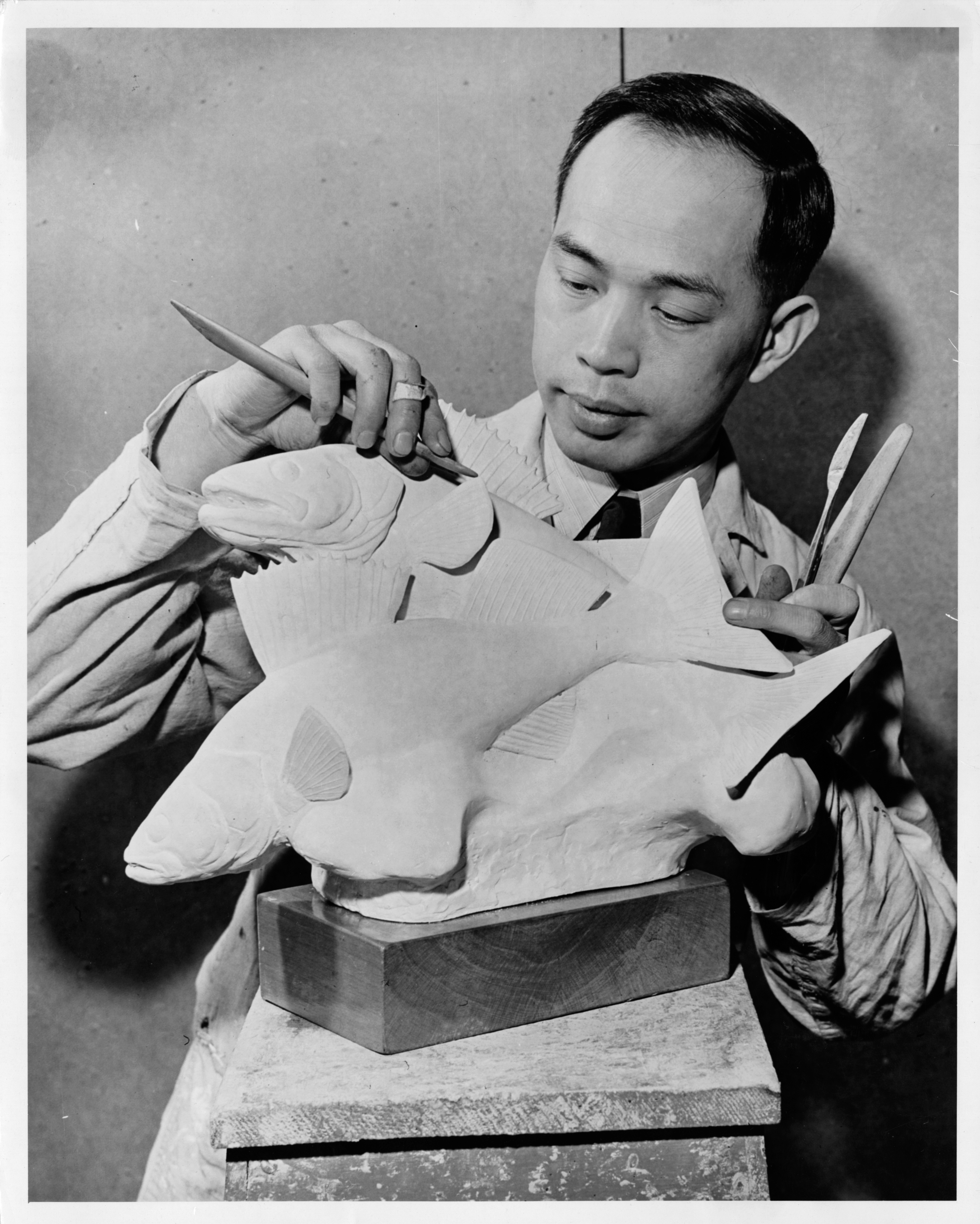
Sing Hoo with sculpture "Happy Pair"

Sing Hoo (15 May 1911 – March 2000) was a Chinese-Canadian sculptor.

== Career ==
Sing Hoo was born in Canton (now Guangzhou), China, on 15 May 1911. He emigrated to Canada in 1922 and graduated from OCAD University in 1933. In Toronto, Sing Hoo worked with renowned sculptor Emanuel Hahn, helping him with the Sir Adam Beck Monument in Toronto. From 1934 to 1942, Hoo worked in the Paleontology department at the Royal Ontario Museum. In 1937, he went to London, England, in order to continue his studies at the Slade School of Fine Art. He returned to London in 1948 and studied at the Royal Academy of Arts. Hoo was a member of the Royal Canadian Academy, Ontario Society of Artists, Sculptors' Society of Canada, and the International Institute of Arts and Letters.

His works are in the collections of the Art Gallery of Ontario and the National Gallery of Canada.

He died in Toronto in March 2000.
