= Bruce Papitto =

American sculptor (born 1958)

Bruce Papitto (born 1958) is an American sculptor specializing in large cast bronze installation pieces.

Among his works are public sculptures such as "The Patriot" in Bedford, Massachusetts, an 8 1/2-foot-tall (2.6 m) sculpted figure of a Revolutionary Era Minuteman carrying the Bedford Flag into the first battle of that war. He also was commissioned to create an 8-foot-tall (2.4 m) portrait figure of the late U.S. Senator John Chafee located at Colt State Park in Bristol, Rhode Island.

More recently he has completed "The Bell Keepers", a composition with two 6-foot-tall (1.8 m) figures. It is installed in Albuquerque, New Mexico, at a park near the Rio Grande (at the corner of Rio Grande Boulevard and Alameda Boulevard). It depicts an imagined scene from the Spanish colonial days, circa early 18th century, when the land was under Spanish rule. At the site of this park, the river would leave its banks during recurring seasonal flooding. As a result, the course of the Rio Grande has changed many times, challenging the endurance of the peoples who have occupied the region. During Spanish control, adobe churches were built and, during the most serious floods, many were washed away. Papitto tried to imagine what those colonists would have thought valuable and worth rescuing from a collapsing church.
