= Aisa Amittu =

Inuk sculptor

- Born: September 6, 1951 (age 74); Puvirnituq, Nunavik
- Known for: Sculpture, printmaking

Aisa Amittu (born September 6, 1951) is an Inuk sculptor and printmaker. He was born in Puvirnituq, Nunavik to sculptor Davidialuk Alasua Amittu.

He learned carving from his father during his teenage years. With his works first exhibited publicly in 1989 at the Inuit Galerie in Mannheim, Germany. His work is included in the collections of the Musée national des beaux-arts du Québec and the National Gallery of Canada.

His works are often narrative, based on Inuit mythology and hunting practices.
