= Raúl Podestá =

Argentine painter and sculptor

Raúl Podestá (1899–1970) was an Argentine painter and sculptor.

== Housing of works ==
=== National ===
- National Museum of Fine Arts
- Museum of Fine Arts Boca
- Ministry of War
- Ministry of Education
- City Council of the City of Buenos Aires
- Home Colonial Chapel "Ricardo Gutiérrez", Marcos Paz, Buenos Aires
- Church of the Savior
- Maternal Asylum "Santa Rosa" of Buenos Aires
- Cathedral in the City of Tandil
- Church in the seaside resort of Costa del Este,

=== International ===
- Church of St. Francis de Sales in Paris, France
- Argentine Consulate in Florence .
- Private collections in Argentina, Italy, France, Belgium, the Netherlands, England and the United States.
