= Elias Wakan =

Canadian sculptor

Elias Wakan (born April 20, 1945) is a constructivist sculptor working since 1996 on Gabriola Island, in British Columbia, Canada. His sculptures are reminiscent of the work of Naum Gabo and others in the Russian Constructivist movement. His wooden sculptures are assembled from as many as thousands of identical pieces of wood. The unit shapes are straight edged, sometimes rectilinear, sometimes triangular, but once assembled produce curved, abstract, geometric sculptures.

Before moving to Gabriola, Wakan was one of two owners of Pacific-Rim Publishers, along with his wife, the poet, Naomi Wakan. Naomi was Nanaimo's Inaugural Poet Laureate.
