= Androbulus =

Androbulus was a sculptor in classical antiquity. He was mentioned by Pliny the Elder as having been celebrated as a maker of statues of philosophers.
