= Jenny Mucchi-Wiegmann =

German sculptor

Jenny Mucchi-Wiegmann (1 December 1895 in Spandau – 2 July 1969 in Berlin), also known as Genni Mucchi, was a German sculptor who worked primarily with terracotta and bronze. Her work has been exhibited at the Exposition Internationale des Arts et Techniques dans la Vie Moderne, the Venice Biennale, and the National Gallery in Berlin.
