= Marc Rembold =

Swiss artist

Marc Rembold (born 1963 in Zurich) is a Swiss artist. He developed the "Light in Colour" concept during the 1980s. The concept was defined as living colours which change their value with the temperature of the light. In 2000 he worked on the realisation of his series Liquids, in which colours were inspired from the electromagnetic waves of the light spectrum. The work, "a manifest of the immaterial to material", brings visible the realm of light's invisible colour spectrum.

A series of postcards from his sculpture series Filimini Maximalisme were shown in 2003 at the Museum für Schrift Druck und Papier in Basel. The film festival volts&visions 2007 in Zurich had a live Art Screen Animation during the projection of Michelangelo Antonioni's Blow-Up.

Marc Rembold has exhibited in Europe, North America and Asia. He lives and works in Basel, Switzerland.
