= American Specialty Cars =

Defunct American automotive supplier

- Formerly: American Sunroof Company
- Founded: 1965
- Founder: Heinz Prechter
- Defunct: 2017
- Headquarters: Southgate, Michigan, later Warren, Michigan
- Products: Sunroofs, convertible tops, low-volume specialty vehicles

American Specialty Cars (commonly known as ASC, and originally the American Sunroof Company) was an American automotive supplier that designed, engineered and built sunroofs, convertible roof systems and low-volume specialty vehicles for automakers. Founded by Heinz Prechter in 1965, it introduced factory sunroofs to American cars and went on to build convertibles and specialty models for Ford, General Motors, Chrysler, Porsche and others, including the ASC/McLaren cars and the Buick GNX. After filing for bankruptcy in 2007, its remaining units were sold to a private equity firm, and the company ceased operations in 2017.

== History ==
Prechter, a West German immigrant, founded the American Sunroof Company in Los Angeles in 1965, installing sliding sunroofs at a time when they were almost unknown on American cars. Work for Ford brought the company to the Detroit area in 1967. Ford had ASC add sunroofs to some 1968 Mercury Cougar XR-7s, making the Cougar the first American car offered with a sunroof as a factory option. The company was later headquartered in Southgate, Michigan.

ASC expanded into convertible conversions, beginning with the 1982 Buick Riviera convertible. It also bought McLaren Engines, the Michigan-based racing engine business founded by Bruce McLaren, and used the McLaren name on a series of performance models. By 1992 the company had nearly 3,000 employees and about $400 million in annual sales.

Prechter died in 2001. In 2002 ASC was sold to the private equity firm Questor Management, and former DaimlerChrysler executive Paul Wilbur became chief executive. In 2003 the company sold its aftermarket sunroof business to Inalfa, and in January 2004 it changed its name to American Specialty Cars, with a "new emphasis on handling design, engineering and manufacturing of low-volume niche vehicles". ASC built its one-millionth convertible in 2005.

In early 2007 ASC sold off equipment from its specialty-car business, and later that year it filed for Chapter 11 bankruptcy. Los Angeles private equity firm Hancock Park Associates agreed to buy its convertible roof systems and design services units, and formed Specialty Vehicle Acquisition Corp., which continued doing business as ASC from Warren, Michigan, with pickup truck tonneau covers becoming its main product. The company's remaining assets were sold to Roush Industries, and ASC dissolved in 2017.

== Products ==
=== ASC/McLaren ===
In 1984 ASC and Ford introduced the ASC McLaren, a dressed-up edition of the Mercury Capri. The cars had no connection to the McLaren Formula One team, and the changes were mostly cosmetic: blue and orange paint, a body kit, unique wheels and McLaren graphics, along with firmer springs and dampers and BFGoodrich performance tires. The package added about $4,000 to the price of a Capri.

After the Capri ended production in 1986, the program moved to the Ford Mustang, and from 1987 to 1990 just over 1,800 Mustangs, in both coupe and convertible form, received the ASC McLaren treatment. The ASC McLaren Mustang convertible was a two-seater with the rear seat removed, a windshield raked back an additional 20 degrees, a soft top with three side windows, Enkei wheels and a blue leather interior. Its top was raised and lowered by hand, but the metal cover over the folded top was power-operated. Sales were held back by price, since a well-optioned example cost roughly half again as much as a Mustang GT; 289 were built for the 1989 model year. ASC also produced an ASC/McLaren Pontiac Turbo Grand Prix.

The best known of the McLaren collaborations was the 1987 Buick GNX, a high-performance version of the Regal Grand National with a Garrett turbocharger and revised transmission and suspension; 547 were built.

=== Concepts ===
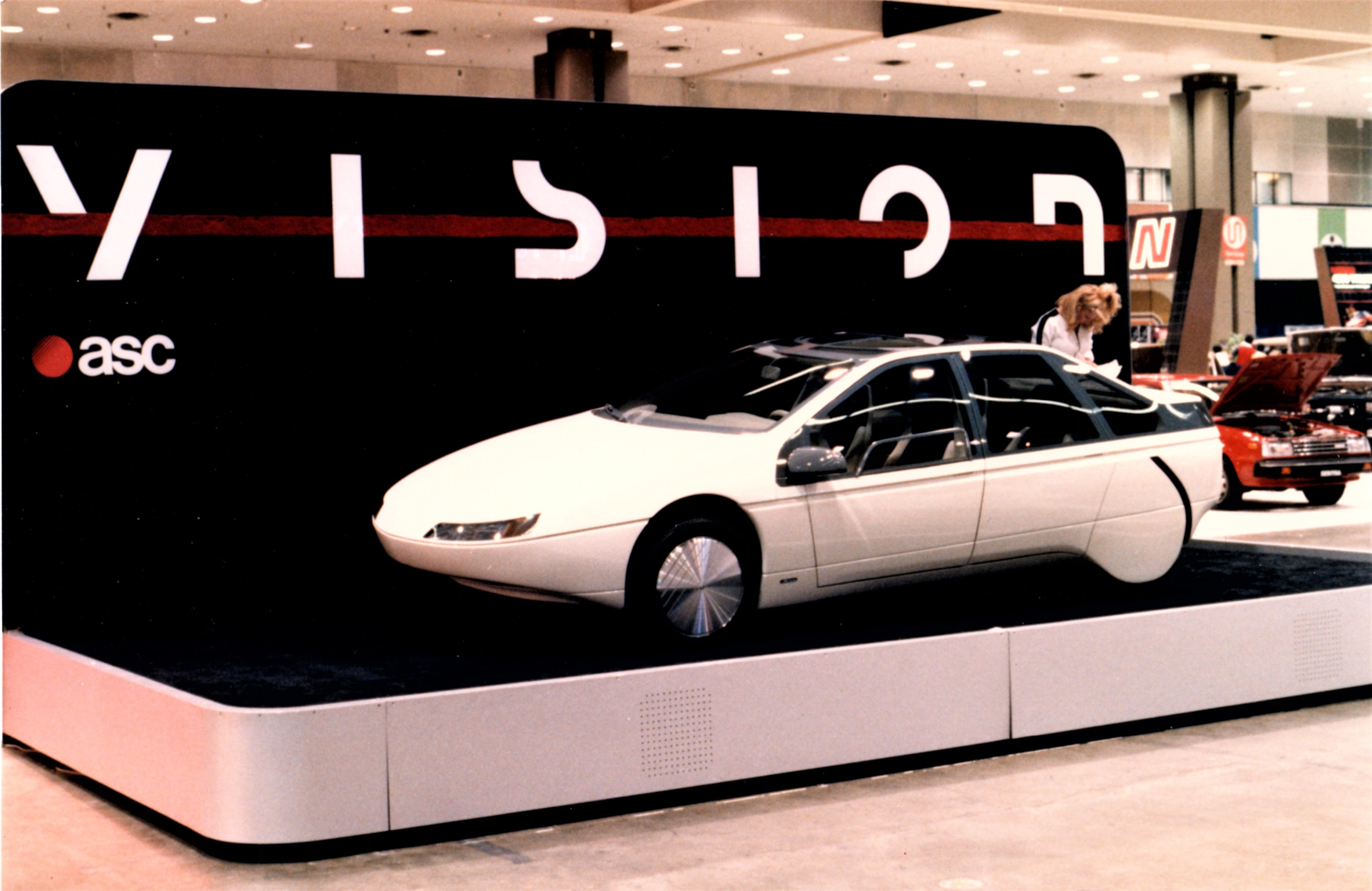
ASC Vision concept at the LA Auto Show

In 1983 the Ford Flair ASC Concept was presented, built by ASC. In 1984, ASC built a concept car called the Vision, featuring a glass roof with a semi circular sunroof that dropped down and rotated to sit below the roof glass. In 1993 ASC created a Cadillac Seville coupe concept car. In 1994 ASC and Heuliez built a prototype for a Citroen ZX convertible. In 2004 ASC unveiled the Helios concept, a four-door convertible version of the Chrysler 300C.

=== Production work ===
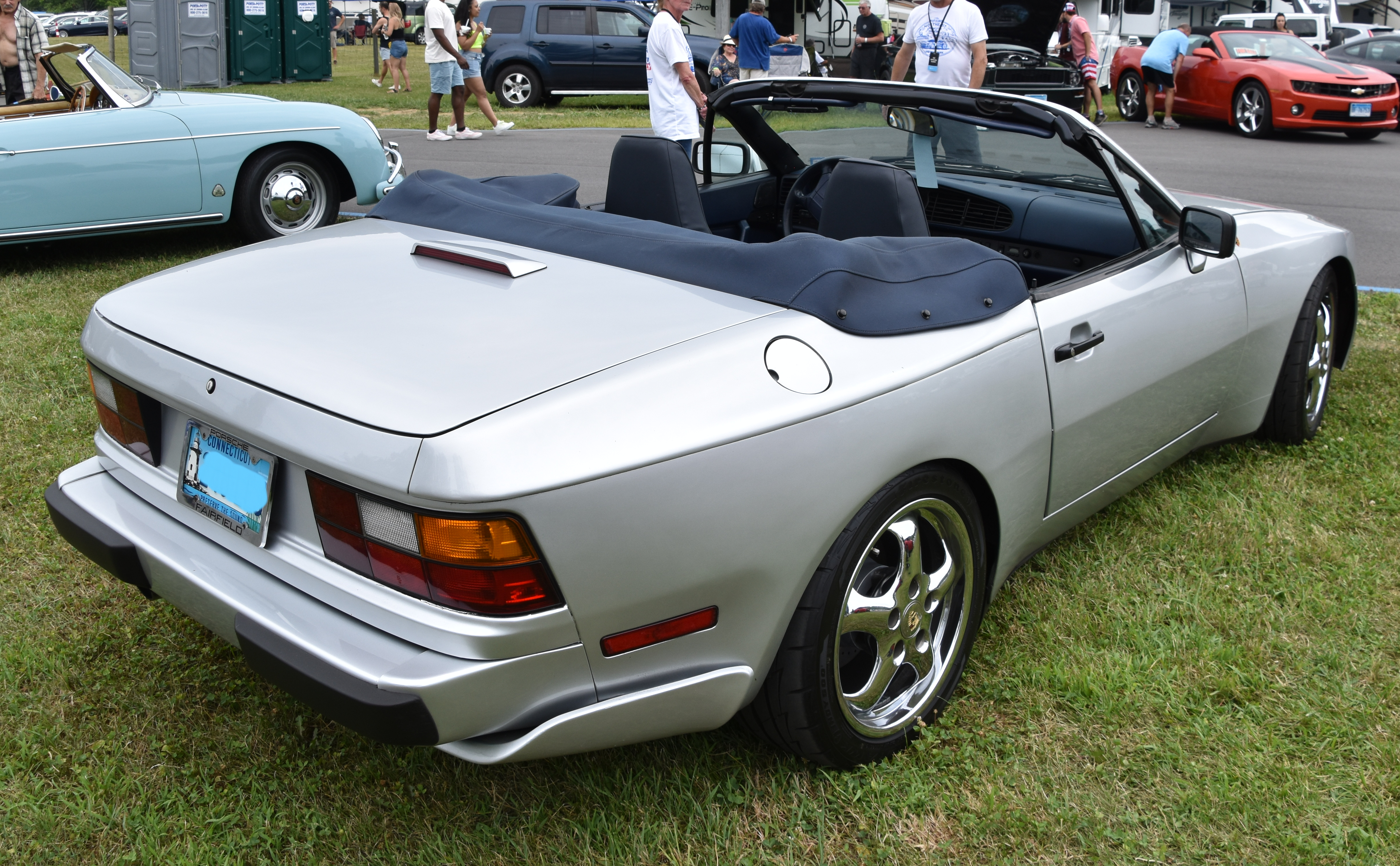
Porsche 944 S2 Cabriolet (1991)

The first generation Saab 900 cabriolet was developed by ASC and first unveiled as a 1983 concept car. From 1989, ASC manufactured the Porsche 944 Cabriolet at its factory in Weinsberg, Germany.

Other ASC convertible and roof work included Chevrolet Corvette convertible tops, the Dodge Dakota convertible pickup, convertible versions of GM's Chevrolet Cavalier and Pontiac Sunbird through the GENASYS joint venture, and convertible or roof work on the Toyota Solara, Mitsubishi Eclipse, Chevrolet Camaro, Pontiac Firebird and BMW Z3. At its Long Beach, California, operation it converted Japanese cars such as the Mitsubishi 3000GT Spyder.

ASC handled much of the development of the Chevrolet SSR retractable-hardtop pickup and managed about 90 percent of its content.
