= Monument to Franz Ferdinand in Sarajevo =

Monument in Sarajevo

Coordinates: 43°51′27″N 18°25′44″E

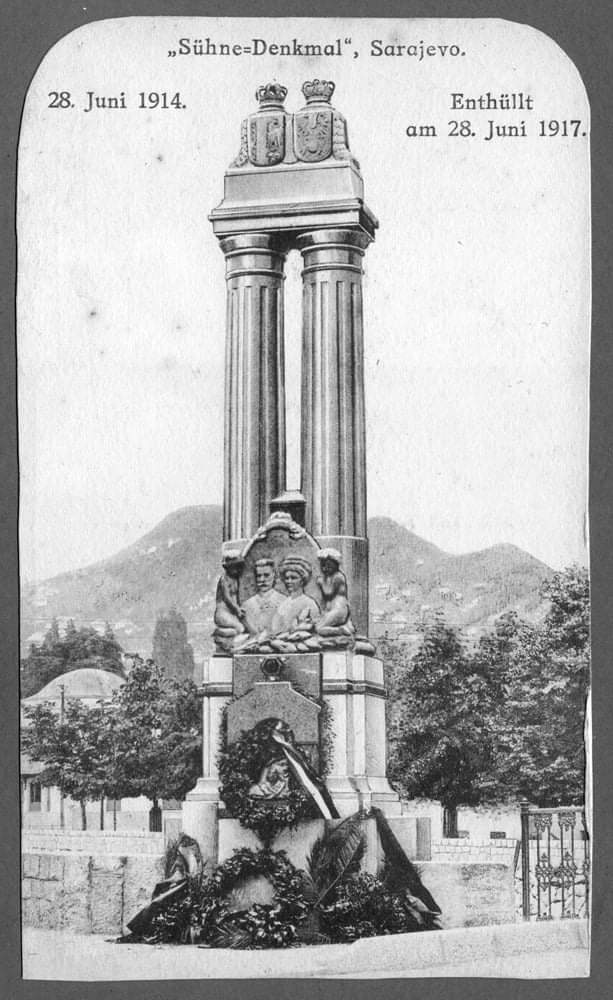
The Monument in Sarajevo

The Atonement Monument was unveiled in the city of Sarajevo on June 28, 1917. The monument commemorated the assassination attempt in Sarajevo on June 28, 1914, in which Gavrilo Princip assassinated the heir to the Austro-Hungarian throne, Franz Ferdinand, and was located in the immediate vicinity of the Latin Bridge. After the war, the monument was dismantled. Parts of the monument were housed in the Sarajevo City Museum until the 1970s. Since 2014, there have been discussions about reconstructing the monument.

According to plans by Jenő Bory, the twelve-meter-high structure was made of Silesian granite. The memorial consisted of two columns visible from afar. The base bore a bronze plaque on which a portrait of the murdered heir to the throne and the Austro-Hungarian coat of arms were inscribed. A stone bench was erected opposite. The altar of the memorial was blown up. The bench still exists today. Since 2014, a two-meter-high glass plate depicting the atonement monument has been located at the site of the memorial. The glass plate contains the following inscription: Memorial to the victims of the assassination attempt in Sarajevo, Archduke Franz Ferdinand, heir to the throne of Austria-Hungary and his wife Sophie, Duchess of Hohenberg. Unveiled on June 28, 1917 and removed in 1919. Architect: Jenő Bory.

Bory developed further plans for a large cathedral that would seat 4,000 people. The building, consisting of several complexes, was to include a church and a youth center. The plans, drawn up in 1917, could not be realized.

- Before the construction of the atonement monument, a stone plaque with the inscription in Bosnian was placed at the site: "28.VI.1914 The heir to the throne, Archduke Franz Ferdinand, and his wife, Duchess Sophie Hohenberg, suffered martyrdom at the hands of murderers at this intersection."
- In 1930, a stone plaque in Serbo-Croatian was installed with the inscription "At this historic place, Gavrilo Princip brought freedom on 15/28 Vidovdan." This stone plaque was presented to Hitler as war booty after the Balkan campaign on his 52nd birthday. After the war, the plaque was handed over to a representative of the Yugoslav Military Commission on 6 November 1946. Since then, the plaque has disappeared.
