= William Holly =

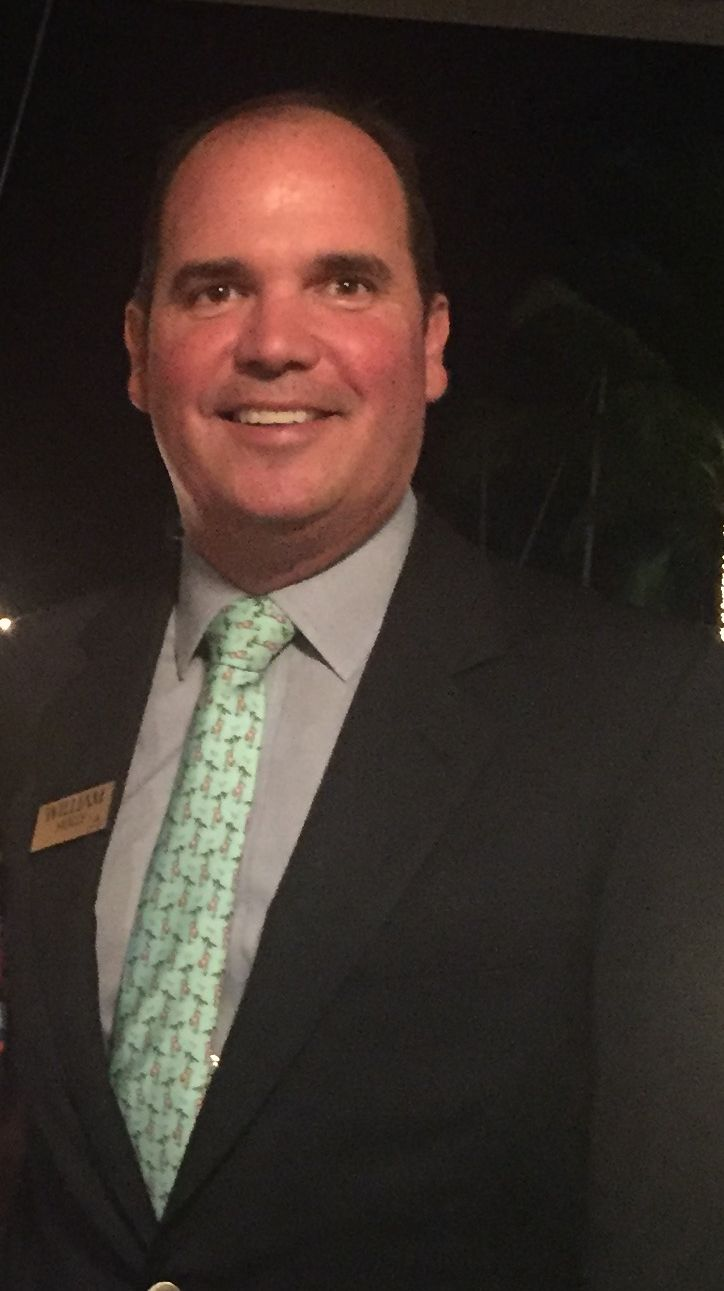
- Born: October 7, 1968 (age 57); Coral Gables, Florida, U.S.
- Education: Florida State University; Louisiana State University
- Occupations: Real Estate Developer and Investor
- Known for: 'Entrepreneur of the Year Award' in 2007
- Spouse: Allison Moore Holly
- Children: Three
- Website: www.pattonre.com

William Holly is the president and founder of Patton Real Estate which is a commercial real estate firm headquartered in his birthplace of Coral Gables, Florida, United States. Holly has earned many awards and recognition in the commercial real estate business including the 'Entrepreneur of the Year Award' by the Greater Miami Chamber of Commerce (GMCC) in 2007.

== Early life and education ==
William Holly was born on October 7, 1968, in Coral Gables, Florida. His father John Hayes Holly, Jr. was an ophthalmologist in Miami, and graduated from the Miller School of Medicine at the University of Miami, and his mother, Herta Deichmann Holly was an attorney who graduated from the University of Miami School of Law. Holly holds dual bachelor's degrees in history and a Bachelor of Science in international affairs from Florida State University and Louisiana State University. Holly and his wife Allison Moore Holly reside with his family in Coral Gables, Florida with their three children.

== Career ==
=== 1990-1997 ===
Holly's career in commercial real estate began in 1990 with Codina Bush Group where he worked as a commercial real estate broker. He worked with Jeb Bush and Armando Codina leasing and selling office building.

=== 1998-2000 ===
Holly moved to Cushman & Wakefield group and worked there in the capacity of an executive director before setting up the Miami office of Insignia/ESG (now known as CB Richard Ellis). Over his career of 27 years in the real estate industry, he has represented more than 20 Class A office buildings in the Miami market and also owns the Class A pre-lease office market records for Coral Gables, Brickell, and Miami Beach submarkets.

=== 2002-2010 ===
Holly founded his own company, Holly Real Estate, a commercial real estate company in 2002, where he was the firm's chairman and the CEO. Apart from handling development and brokerage, the company had a focus on green development. He developed Miami Green, the first green LEED-certified office building in Miami.

==== Financial Setbacks ====
During the 2008 financial crisis, in his stint as a developer, Holly had encountered a financial setback related to his development of approximately $150 million of active commercial real estate projects at that time and sought chapter 7 bankruptcy protection as the guarantor of these projects.

=== 2011-2012 ===
After running his own firm for many years, Holly returned to Cushman & Wakefield as an executive managing director. In this role, Holly held one of the most senior titles and positions in the State of Florida.

=== 2012-2014 ===
Holly was named president of Miami-based property management and brokerage firm Pointe Group Advisors which managed more than 3 million sq. ft. of commercial space under management and leasing.

=== 2015–present ===
He is the founding shareholder of Apollo Bank, Florida Gulf Bank, and Coral Gables Trust. He is also the past president of the Brickell Area Association and the past chairman of the Ransom Everglades Board of Trustees, the past chairman of the Historical Museum of Southern Florida (History Miami). Holly currently serves as the chairman of the board of Young Presidents Organization (YPO) Americas Gateway Chapter and the YPO North-eastern Region Board. He is also a board member of JB Green Estate, a local real estate investment firm. Holly is on the board of directors of the German-American Heritage Foundation of the USA, a national non-profit organization based in Washington D.C. that promotes German language, culture, and heritage in the United States and works towards preserving the history of Americans of German ancestry who helped build the United States.

== Awards and recognition ==
- 2004: Recognized as one of the top ten Hot Commercial Real Estate Brokers in the US by Commercial Property News.
- 2007: Received the Entrepreneur of the Year Award from the Greater Miami Chamber of Commerce (GMCC).
- 2008: Named as one of the top commercial real estate executives nationally (40 under 40).
- 2008: His company, Holly Real Estate ranked no. 22 on the South Florida Business Journal's list of Largest Commercial Real Estate Brokerages.
- 2014: Named Leasing Agent of the Year by the Building Owners and Managers Association (BOMA) of Miami-Dade at its annual The Outstanding Building of the Year (TOBY) awards.
- 2014: Awarded the Office Building Sale of the Year in 2014 by the National Association of Industrial and Office Properties (NAIOP).

== See also ==
- Real estate broker
- Real estate
