= Modern Art Foundry =

Foundry in Astoria, Queens, New York, USA

Coordinates: 40°46′43″N 73°53′53″W

- Modern art foundry logo
- Industry: Foundry
- Founded: 1932; 94 years ago
- Founder: John Spring
- Headquarters: 88-05 76th Avenue; Glendale, New York 11385, United States
- Key people: Jeffrey Spring, President
- Website: www.modernartfoundry.com

The Modern Art Foundry is an historic foundry in Astoria, Queens, New York, founded in 1932 by John Spring. His descendants continue to operate the business in what used to be the carriage house of the Steinway Mansion. After 81 years in Astoria Modern Art Foundry moved to Glendale Queens in 2026. From 1932 to 1944 the facility was located in Long Island City. 2027 will be the company's 95th year in business.

Modern Art Foundry specializes in working with artists who create limited edition works, usually intended for museums and galleries. The foundry utilizes the lost-wax casting method for producing its large-scale work. It also does maintenance and conservation of existing works.

== History ==
John Spring, a Polish immigrant, started his business in 1932 on Astoria Boulevard, at the end near what is now the Socrates Sculpture Park. In 1947, the foundry moved from its location near the East River to where it is at present. Spring built the business on close relationships with a small group of "prominent and prolific" artists. Among the artists who have worked there are Jose de Creeft, Jacques Lipchitz, Louise Bourgeois, Gaston Lachaise, Joan Miró, Alexander Archipenko, and Isamu Noguchi.

== Operations ==
In contrast to most foundries that have switched over to ceramic shell casting, Modern Art utilizes the lost-wax casting method for producing its large-scale work. Workers first create a wax copy of the artist's original model and then apply a plastic coating to it. The mold is then fired in a kiln, which causes the wax to melt away. Molten bronze is then poured into the mold. This method yields an exact bronze replica of the artist's original model.

The foundry is known for its exacting and innovative work. Bourgeois chose the foundry to cast the Maman sculpture because of its reputation and output. In the early 1960s, Jasper Johns cast "Light Bulb," "Flashlight; Painted Bronze (ale cans)", "Painted Bronze (paintbrushes)", "Flag", and "Bronze (Light Bulb, Socket, Wire on Grid" at the foundry.

In 2002, artisans at the foundry replaced the original zinc statues that were part of the 1867 Civil War Soldiers Monument in the Green-Wood Cemetery, Brooklyn, with bronze replicas.

Modern Art Foundry has relocated to Glendale Queens in March of 2026.

== Gallery ==
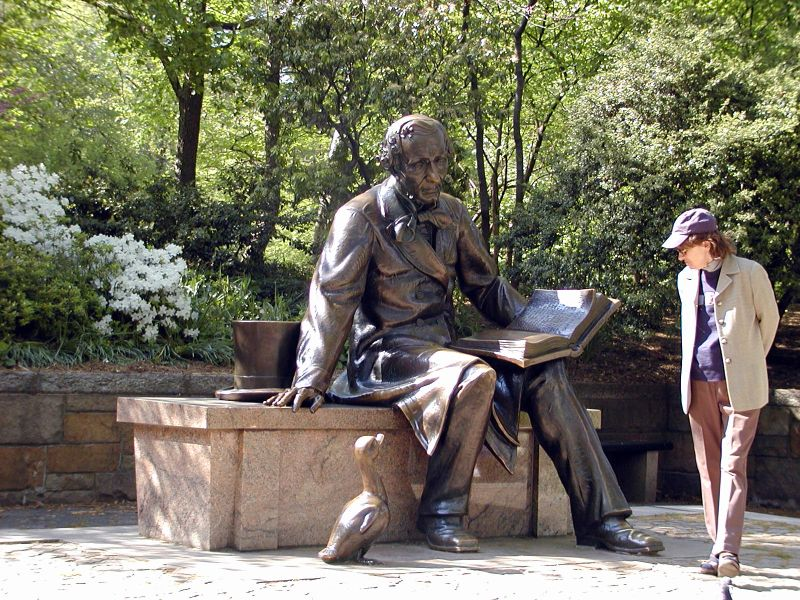
Hans Christian Andersen, by Georg John Lober, located in Central Park

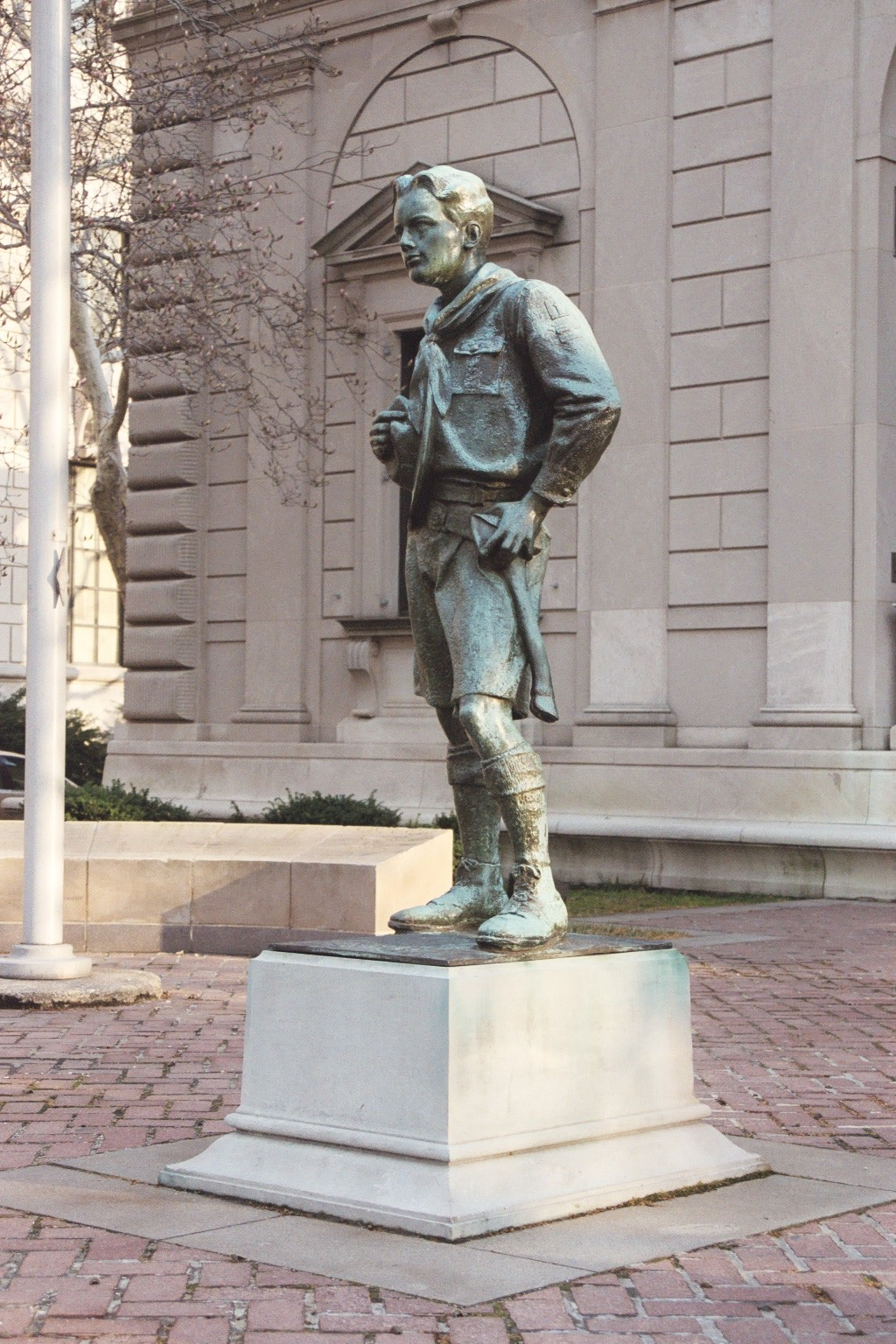
The Ideal Scout by R. Tait McKenzie in Philadelphia and other locations

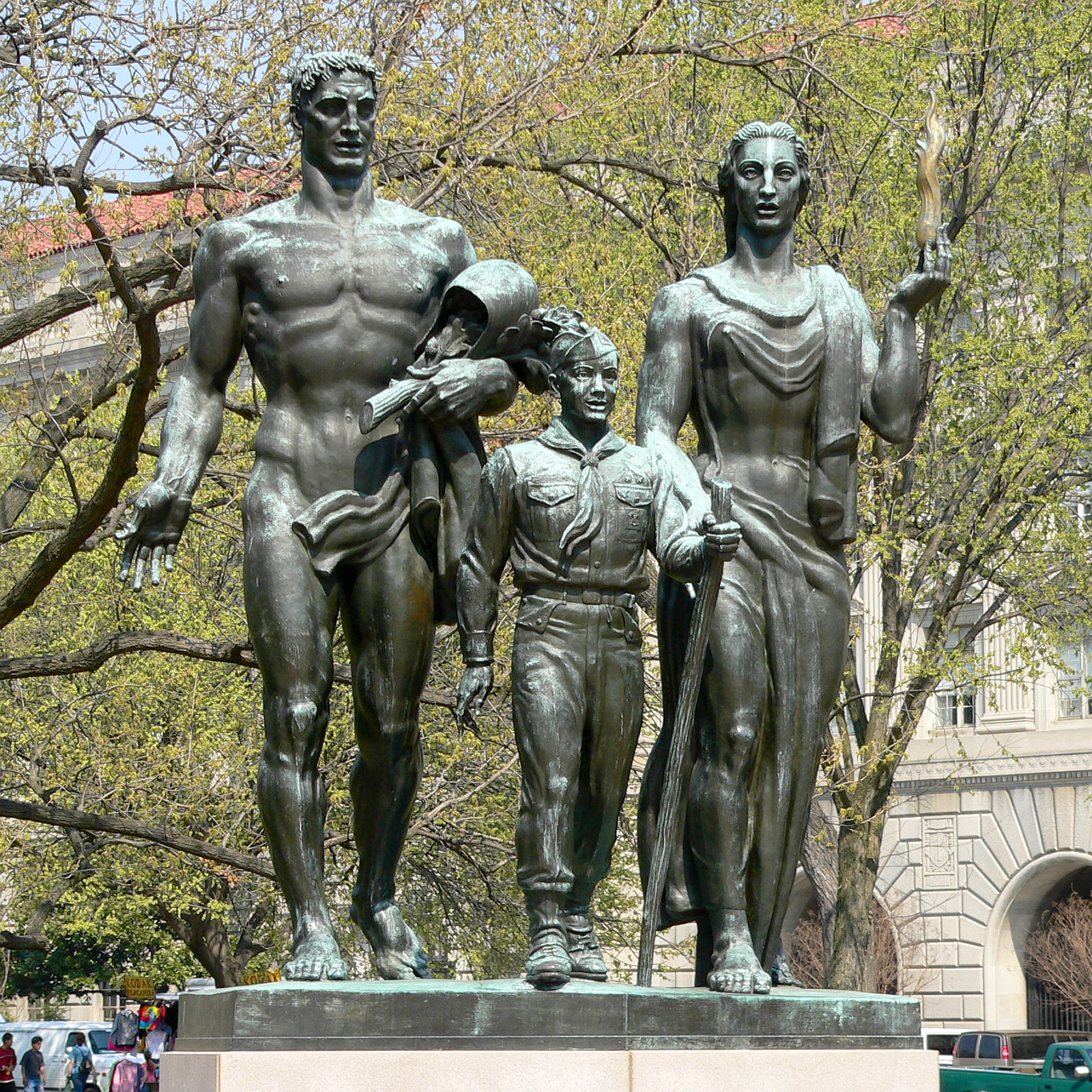
Boy Scout Memorial by Donald De Lue, located at The Ellipse in Washington, D.C.

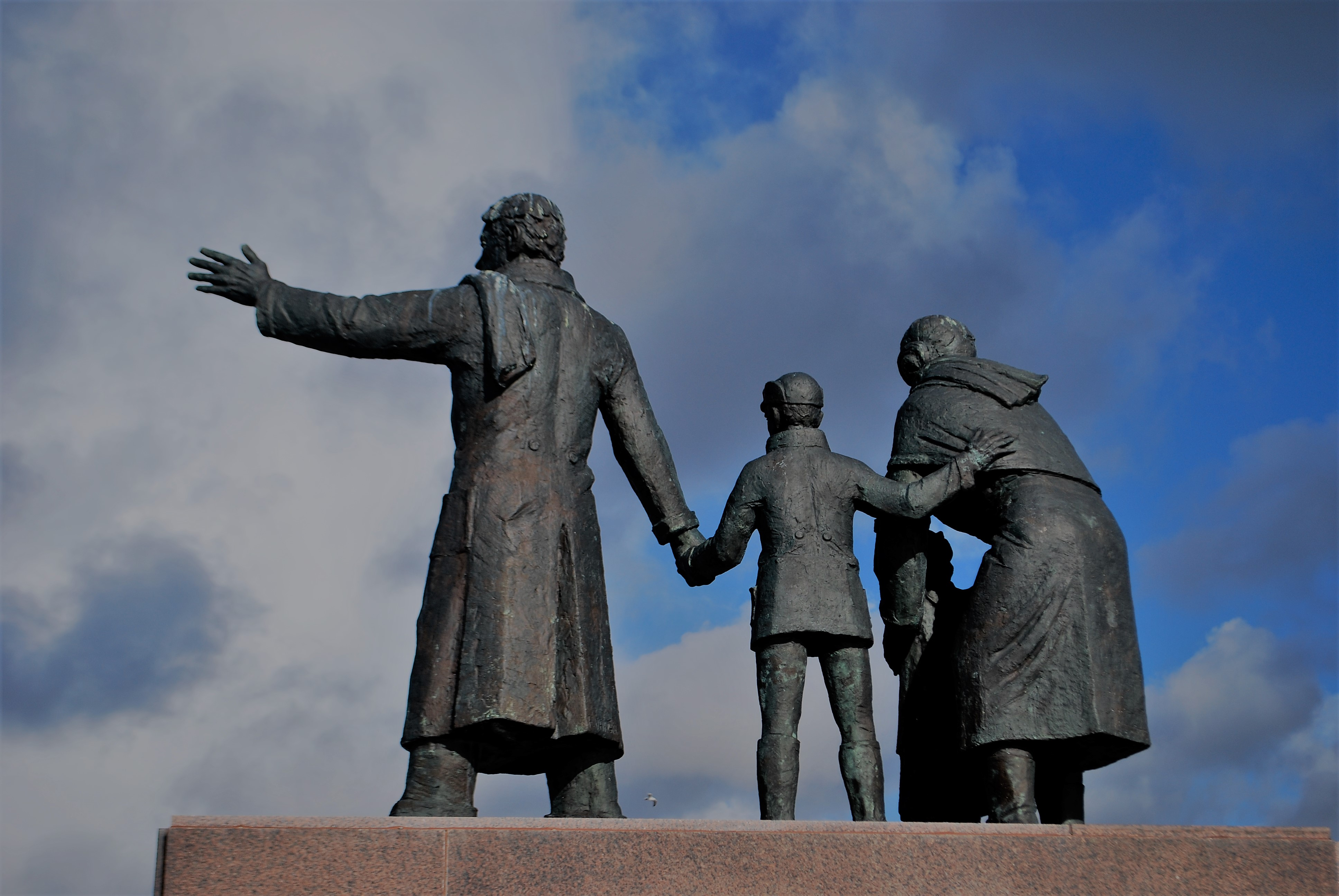
Auswandererdenkmal (Emigrant Memorial) by Frank Varga, located in Bremerhaven, Germany

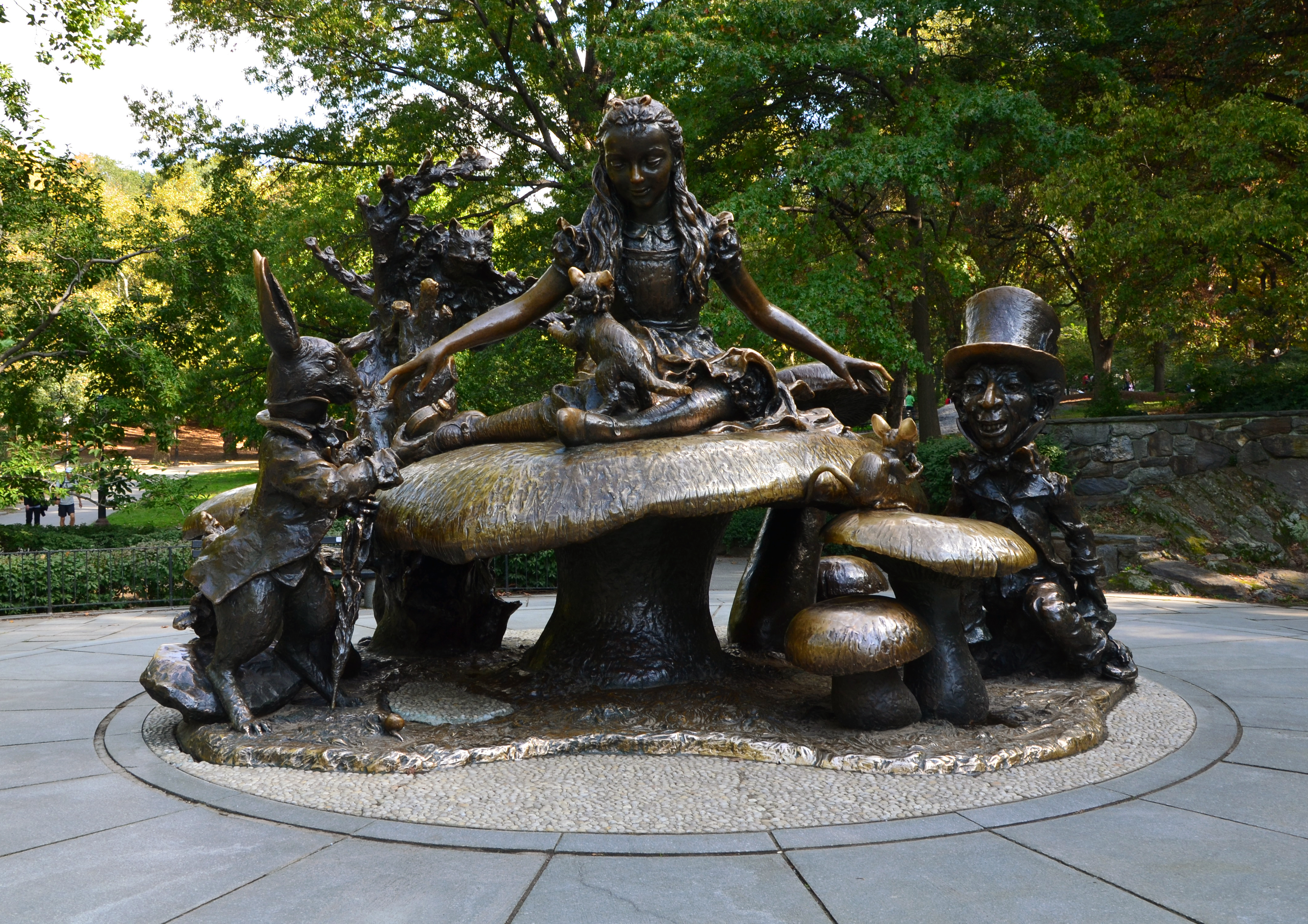
Alice in Wonderland sculpture by Jose de Creeft, located in Central Park

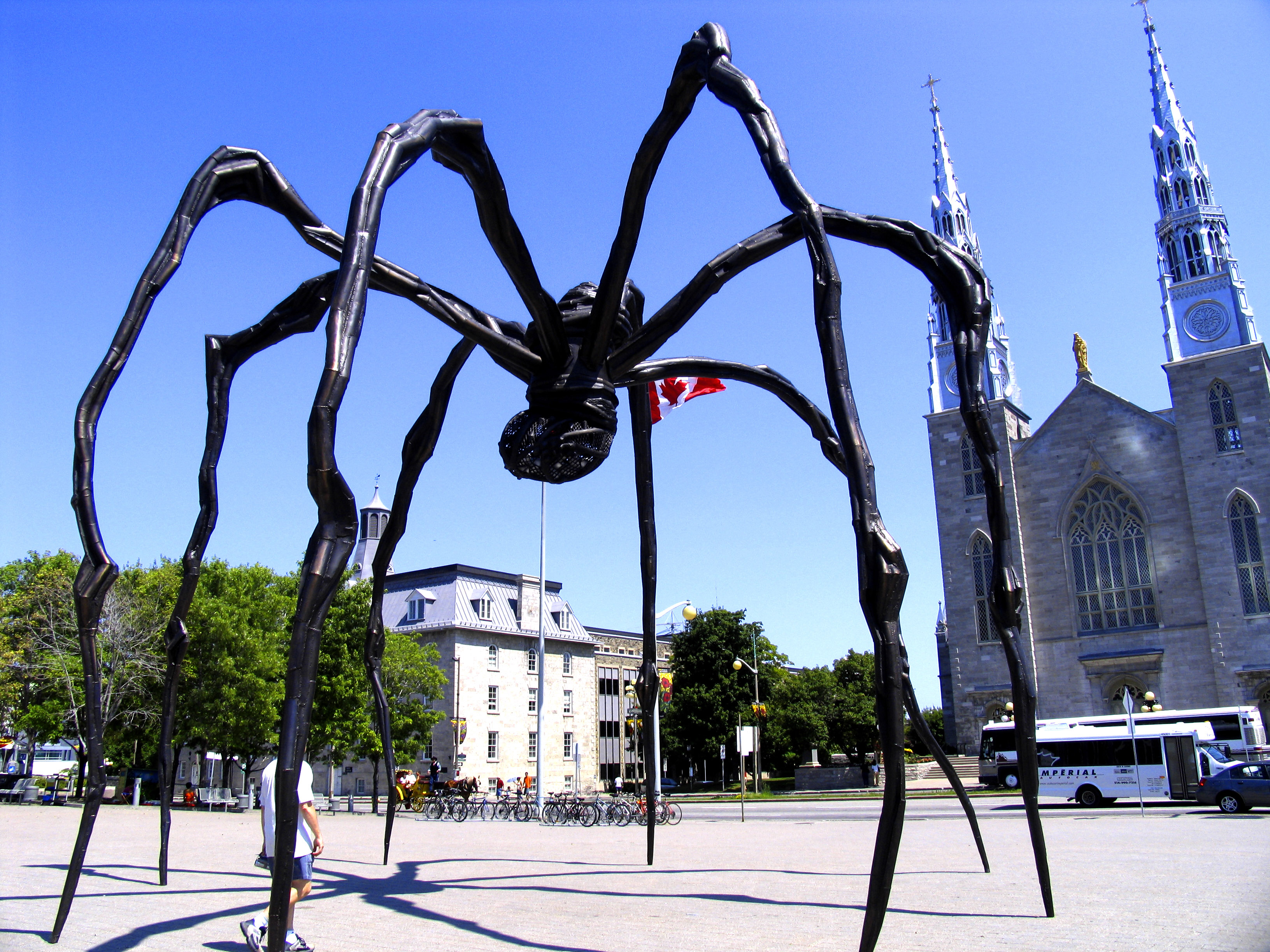
Maman by Bourgeois

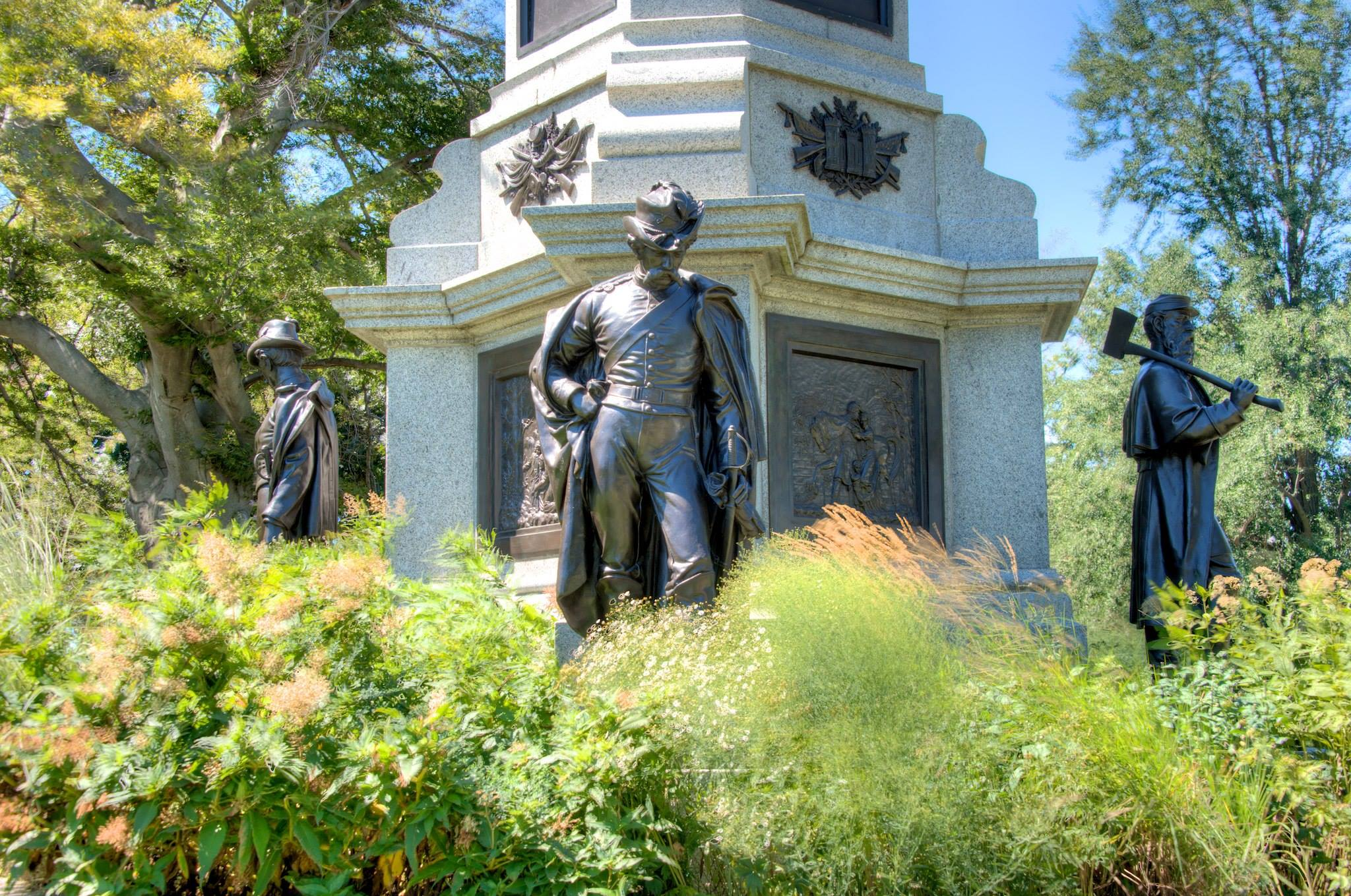
Soldier's Monument at Green-Wood Cemetery
