= Auswandererdenkmal =

Statue in Bremerhaven, Germany

- Emigrant Memorial (English)
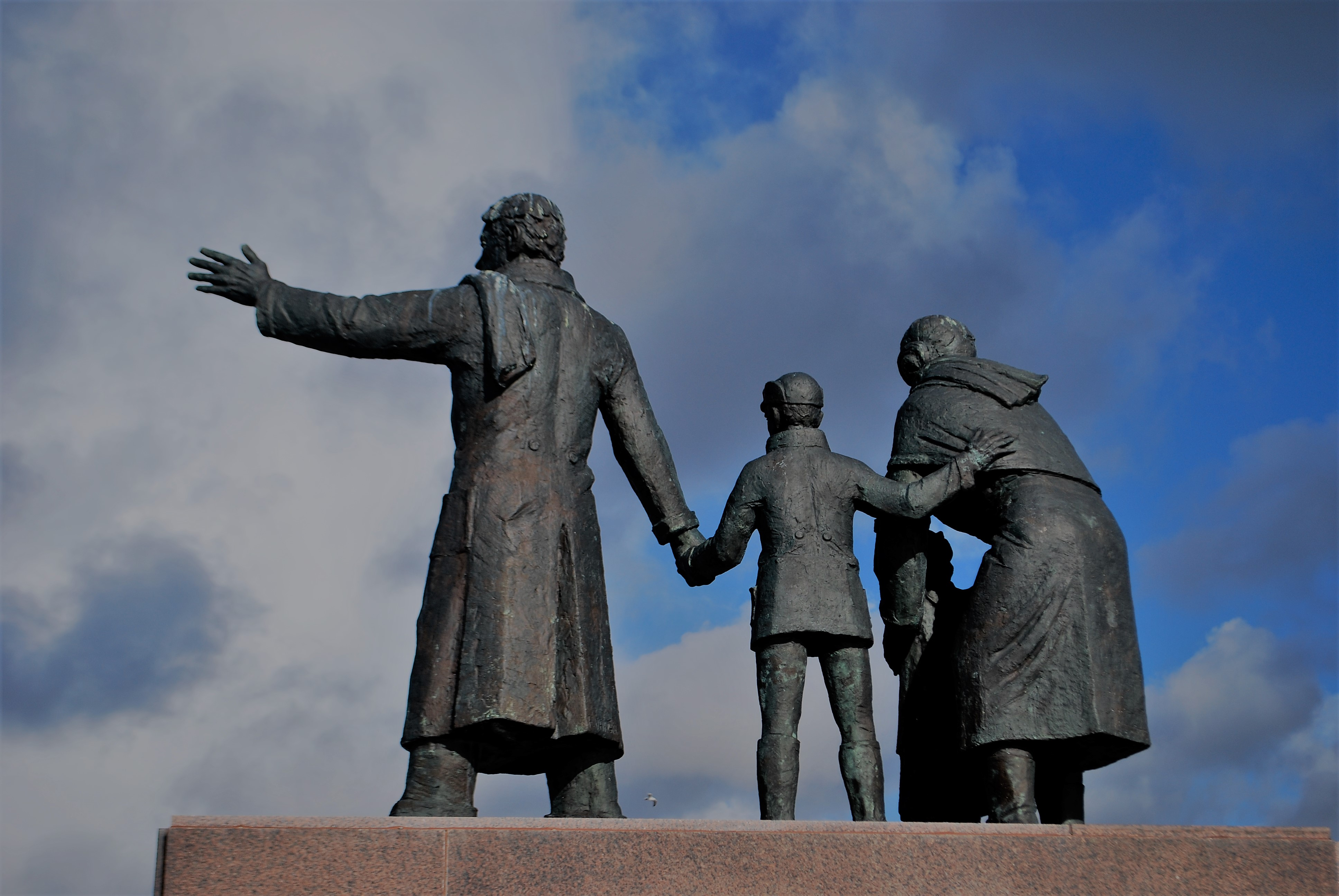
- Auswandererdenkmal
- Artist: Frank Varga
- Year: 2005
- Location: Bremerhaven, Germany; 53°32′38″N 8°34′12″E

The Auswandererdenkmal (German for Emigrant Memorial) is a statue in the port of Bremerhaven, Germany, that depicts an emigrant family. Cast in bronze, it shows an emigrant family with the father looking forward toward the New World and the mother looking back as she leaves the old country. The statue stands by one of the city's main dikes, the Weserdeich, on the site of one of the original docks from which early emigrants departed.

The statue is one of the most acclaimed works of sculptor Frank Varga. At more than 6 meters (20 ft) tall, the statue faces towards the United States.

== Background ==
The United German-American Committee began raising funds to erect the Auswandererdenkmal in Bremerhaven in 1985. The statues were cast at Modern Art Foundry in New York City. Bremerhaven is an appropriate site for the statue as it was the largest port for emigration from Germany. Between 1830 and 1974, some 7.2 million Europeans traveled to Bremerhaven to board ships bound for the New World.

On 8 August 2005, 20 years after the memorial was completed, a new museum was erected to re-create the history and routes of emigrants. The 3,500 square metres (38,000 sq ft) German Emigration Center in Bremerhaven offers visitors one of the largest theme experiences in Germany. The museum, designed to replicate an ocean liner, includes special exhibits, films and cultural events.

Appropriately, the cornerstone of the museum was laid on 6 October, German-American Day, 2004. At the ceremony, the American Consul, Robert K. Scott, noted, "By commemorating the millions of men and women who sailed to the New World, the German Emigration Center is making an invaluable contribution to the historic portrayal of my county."

== See also ==
- German Americans
- List of German Americans
- German-Americans in the Civil War
- German-American Heritage Foundation of the USA
