= Georg J. Lober =

American sculptor

Georg John Lober
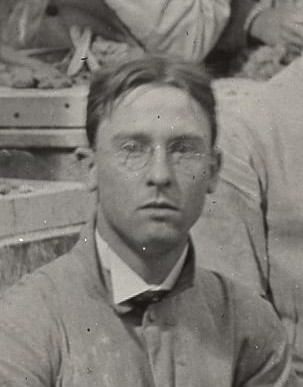
- Lober in 1911
- Born: November 7, 1891
- Died: December 14, 1961 (aged 70)
- Known for: sculptor

Georg John Lober (November 7, 1891 – December 14, 1961) was an American sculptor best known for his 1959 statue of composer George M. Cohan situated in Times Square, a 1949 sculpture of statesman Thomas Paine in Morristown, New Jersey, and a bronze sculpture of Danish writer Hans Christian Andersen located in Central Park, Manhattan. He served for nearly two decades as executive secretary for the New York City Municipal Art Commission, from 1943 to 1960.

== Background ==
Born in Chicago, Illinois, in 1892, Lober moved to Keyport, New Jersey, as a teenager. Lober studied sculpture at the Beaux-Arts Institute of Design and at the National Academy of Design. He apprenticed to sculptor Gutzon Borglum, who is credited with the statesmen at Mount Rushmore.

== Career ==
Lober's first major works were bas reliefs of Robert Fulton, inventor of the steamship, and explorer Henry Hudson in 1909. A bronze statue of Eve that he created for the 1939 New York World's Fair in Flushing, Queens was destroyed by vandals. A 1949 sculpture of Revolutionary War figure Thomas Paine is located in Morristown, New Jersey's Burnham Park.

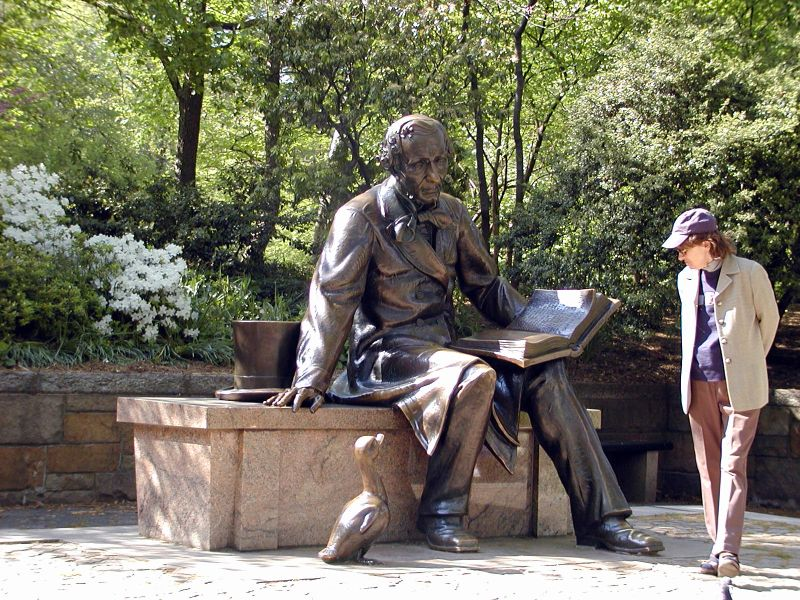
Statue of Hans Christian Andersen, by Georg John Lober, Central Park in New York City

Lober was appointed to the New York City Municipal Art Commission in 1942; it was responsible for supervising the artistic quality of all city matters. He served as its executive secretary from 1943 to 1960.

In 1946 he and the Commission were tasked by Mayor of New York City William O'Dwyer to restore portraits in New York City Hall that had deteriorated severely. A June 1950 editorial in The New York Times thanked Lober and the Art Commission, saying that they "deserve a pat on the back for their careful and painstaking work" in preserving the city's heritage for future generations.

Lober created an 8 feet (2.4 m) seated figure of Hans Christian Andersen on a granite bench for New York City's Central Park, which was installed in 1956. It was cast in bronze at Long Island City's Modern Art Foundry. The statue was designed to accompany an outdoor center for story-telling, and was placed on a 40-foot square stone platform surrounded by benches, trees and shrubs. The $75,000 cost of the monument was covered in part by contributions from Danish and American schoolchildren. Lober returned to the theme with his 1955 medal commemorating the 150th anniversary of Anderson's birth, created for the Society of Medalists.

Composer Oscar Hammerstein II was the chairman of a committee that selected Lober and architect Otto F. Langmann to develop a statue of composer, playwright, and actor George M. Cohan. It was installed in Father Duffy Square on Broadway at the northern end of Times Square in Midtown Manhattan. The statue was formally unveiled and dedicated on September 11, 1959, by Mayor Robert F. Wagner.

== Denmark ==
In 1912, Lober created an emblem for the Rebild National Park (Danish: Rebild Bakker] in Rebild, Region Nordjylland, Denmark. He also made a bronze relief of United States President Abraham Lincoln that was installed in Rebild National Park. Lober's bronze portrait of native son Hans Christian Andersen is in the Odense Museum. Denmark recognized Lober in 1950 with an appointment as a Knight of the Order of the Dannebrog.

== Personal life ==
Lober lived at 33 West 67th Street in Manhattan. He died on December 14, 1961, and was interred in St. Joseph's Cemetery in Keyport.

== See also ==
- City Employees War Memorial - War memorial designed by Lober in Central Park
