= Heinz Prechter =

German-American entrepreneur (1942–2001)

- Born: January 19, 1942; Kleinhöbing, Germany
- Died: July 6, 2001 (aged 59); Grosse Ile Township, Michigan, U.S.
- Education: San Francisco State College
- Occupation: Entrepreneur
- Known for: Founding the American Sunroof Company (ASC)
- Spouse: Waltraud Prechter
- Children: 2

Heinz C. Prechter (January 19, 1942 – July 6, 2001) was a German-born American entrepreneur who founded the American Sunroof Company (ASC), the auto supplier credited with bringing factory sunroofs to American cars. He also built a group of Michigan businesses that included the Heritage newspaper chain, and was a prominent fundraiser for the Bush family. After his death, his widow founded a bipolar disorder research program at the University of Michigan in his name.

== Early life ==
Prechter was born in 1942 in Kleinhöbing, Germany, and began an apprenticeship in the automotive trades at age 13. His training covered car interior trim, toolmaking and die making, and building car bodies and coaches. He went on to study at the Berufs-Oberschule in Nuremberg and at Nuremberg's Ohm Polytechnic Engineering School, and worked for German companies including Faunwerke, Siemens and Deutz.

In 1963 Prechter came to the United States as an exchange student, where he took classes in English and business administration at San Francisco State College. While a student he began installing sliding sunroofs, which were then almost unheard of on American cars.

== Career ==
=== American Sunroof Company ===
In 1965 Prechter founded the American Sunroof Company in Los Angeles. His first shop was a small garage he rented from customizer George Barris In 1967 he moved to Detroit to install sunroofs for Ford, and the company grew into a major supplier of sunroofs, convertible tops and specialty vehicles, headquartered in Southgate, Michigan. At the time of his death, Prechter was the sole owner of ASC, which had about $550 million in annual revenue.

=== Other businesses ===
Prechter bought the Wyandotte News-Herald and the Mellus newspapers, which became Heritage Newspapers. In 1997 he formed Prechter Holdings to own ASC and his other businesses, including Heritage Media Group and the investment firm Heritage Networks. By 2001 the holding company had about 5,300 employees in automotive, newspaper, real estate, investment and livestock businesses.

=== Civic and political activity ===
Prechter helped turn the Detroit Auto Show into the North American International Auto Show and served on the boards of Comerica Bank and ThyssenKrupp. He was named Entrepreneur of the Year by the Harvard Business Club, and in 1990 the Automotive Hall of Fame gave him its Automotive Industry Leader of the Year award.

A friend of George H. W. Bush since the mid-1970s, Prechter raised $1 million for Bush's 1988 presidential campaign and organized a 1992 trip to Asia by Bush and business leaders. He chaired the President's Export Council during the Bush administration, and in 1990 was appointed chairman of the National Advisory Committee on International Trade.

== Death ==
Prechter had received treatment for severe depression over many years, with major episodes in the late 1970s and early 1990s, but only his family and closest friends knew. He had bipolar disorder, and died by suicide at his home in Grosse Ile on July 6, 2001, at age 59. About 3,000 people attended the public viewing and about 700 attended his funeral, where Michigan Governor John Engler gave a eulogy. He was survived by his wife, Waltraud "Wally" Prechter, and their twin children.

President George W. Bush and First Lady Laura Bush issued a statement calling Prechter a close friend of the Bush family.

== Legacy and honors ==
In November 2001 Wally Prechter founded the Heinz C. Prechter Bipolar Research Fund in her husband's memory. In 2004 it became part of the University of Michigan Health System, and it now operates as the Prechter Program within the Department of Psychiatry at Michigan Medicine.

Prechter was inducted into the Automotive Hall of Fame on October 5, 2004, and into the German-American Hall of Fame in 2014.

== See also ==
- Distinguished German-American of the Year
