= Ruth Hutton Ancker =

American sculptor

Ruth Lapet Hutton Ancker
- Born: Ruth Lapet Hutton; 1901; Bloomsburg, Pennsylvania, U.S.
- Died: August 16, 1979 (aged 77–78); Mount Vernon, New York, U.S.
- Education: Bloomsburg State College; Columbia University
- Known for: Sculpture, illustration

Ruth Hutton Ancker (born Ruth Lapet Hutton; 1901–1979) was an American sculptor in the mid-20th century.

== Early life and education ==
Ruth Hutton was born to William Hutton and his wife. Hutton Ancker's ancestors immigrated to Bloomsburg, Pennsylvania in 1810; they were among the first settlers there. Hutton Ancker's grandfather, Daniel Snyder, donated the ten acres on which the local normal school was built. Many years later, Ruth Hutton was a student in the school, now Bloomsburg University of Pennsylvania She graduated in 1918. In the early 1940s, Anker earned a degree in fine arts at Columbia University in New York. She continued her studies at the Philadelphia Museum School, Parsons School of Design, the University of New Mexico and Cincinnati Art Academy.

== Career ==
Hutton Ancker began her visual arts career in the 1920s as a fashion illustrator and designer, working in New York and Paris. At one point, she was employed in the French office of Women's Wear Daily. She told the Morning Press that she had produced thousands of illustrations, but the originals were purchased by various publications and few examples survived. In New York, she studied under Oronzio Maldarelli for several years, and it was he who encouraged her to pursue sculpture as a full time endeavor. She also learned from Ferenc Varga, Antonucci Volti, and Alessandro Monteleone. Hutton Ancker taught art at Cooper Union, New York City's Pratt Institute, and the University of Cincinnati.

Hutton Ancker's work was exhibited in Paris, Rome, and New York, and she once gave a one-woman show of her sculptures at Bloomsburg State College's Haas Gallery. In New York, her work was shown at the Ward Eggleston Galleries at 969 Madison Avenue in 1959 and 1963. In 1970, the William Penn Museum in Harrisburg, Pennsylvania gave a retrospective exhibit of her work.

== Awards and memberships ==
Hutton Ancker won the Bloomsburg State College Alumni Award from her alma mater 1n 1967. University Woman magazine named her "one of the outstanding women in New Jersey history." She was elected to membership in the Philadelphia Art Alliance, the Painters and Sculptors Society of New Jersey, and the National Society of Arts and Letters. She also won an award for her sculpture from the Washington Sculptors Group. Bloomsburg University of Pennsylvania maintains a special collection of scholarship and media coverage relevant to Hutton Ancker, who is an alumna. The collection includes ten of her notebooks.

== Personal life ==
Hutton married W. Mason Ancker, an advertising and marketing consultant, and appended his name to her own last name. Her brother, Robert Hutton, was a geography teacher for many years in the public school system serving Bloomsburg. She died August 16, 1979, of a heart condition.
