= German-American Heritage Museum of the USA =

Museum in the United States

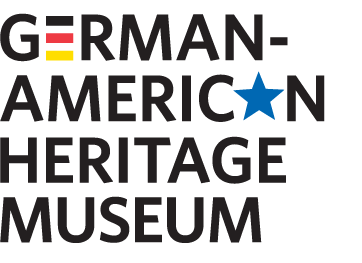
German-American Heritage Museum of the USA
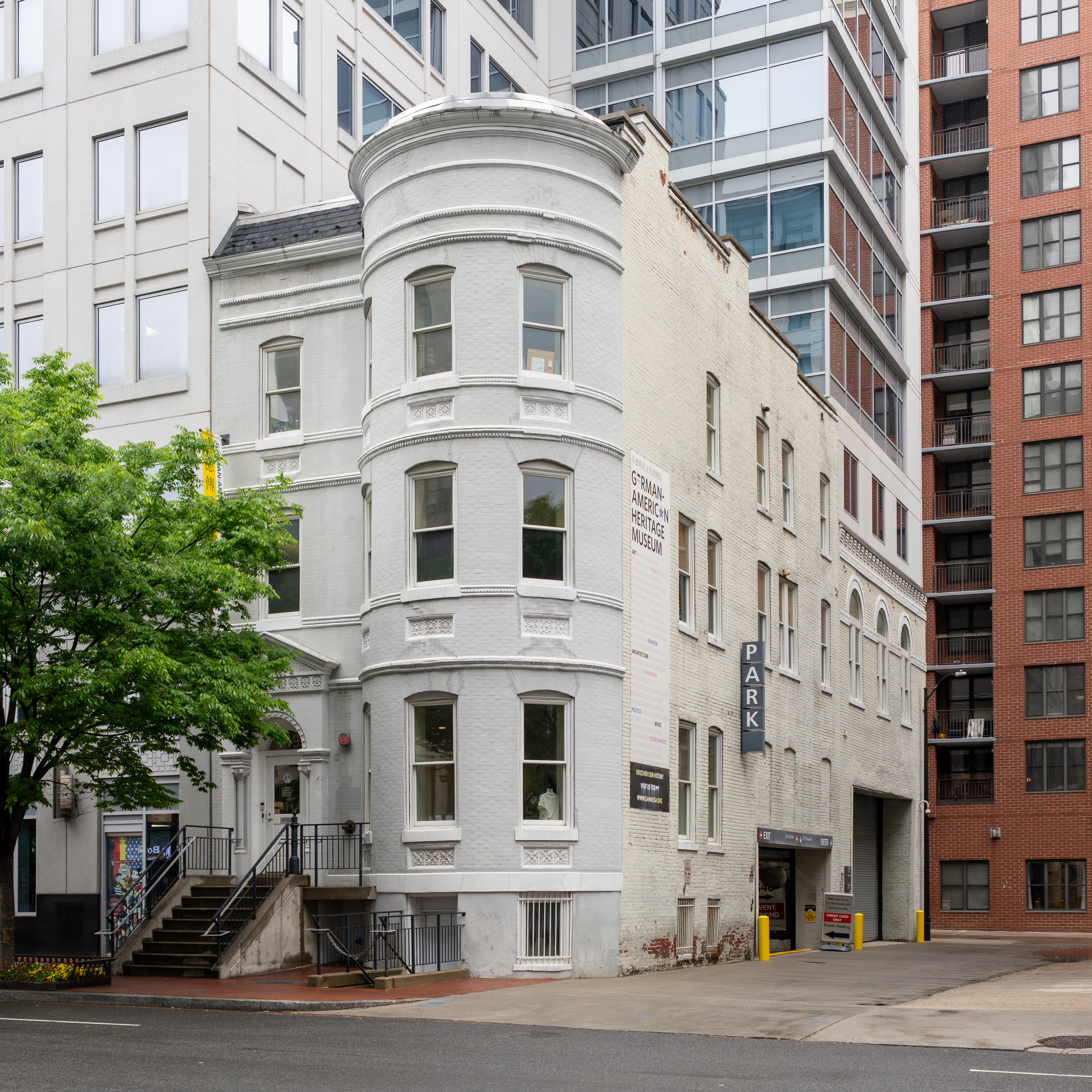

- Location in Washington, D.C. German-American Heritage Museum of the USA (the United States)
- Established: March 2010
- Location: Washington, D.C.
- Coordinates: 38.899083°N 77.019694°W
- Public transit access: Gallery Place-Chinatown
- Website: gahmusa.org

The German-American Heritage Museum of the USA, or GAHM, is located in the Penn Quarter's Hockemeyer Hall in Washington, D.C., the capital of the United States. The GAHM is sponsored by several German and American organizations. The museum, headquarters of the German-American Heritage Foundation of the USA, traces the 400-year long history of Germans in America from 1600 to now. It is inclusive, with Swiss, Austrian, and Slovak Americans as part of its mission.

== History ==
=== Hockemeyer Hall ===
John Hockemeyer was a German man who emigrated to the United States. After the Civil War, he became a wealthy merchant and a leader among Washington, D.C.'s German community. In 1888, Hockemeyer constructed a Victorian townhouse that became a local center for the city's German-American business community and a meeting place for various German clubs and organizations, some of which Hockemeyer was a member of. In October 2008, the German-American Heritage Foundation of the USA purchased this building to establish the museum.
