= Antonio Berti (sculptor) =

Italian sculptor

- Born: 24 August 1904; San Piero a Sieve, Italy
- Died: 1990 (aged 86); Sesto Fiorentino, Italy

Antonio Berti (24 August 1904 – 1990) was an Italian sculptor and medalist. He taught at the Accademia di San Luca and the Accademia di Belle Arti in Florence.

== Career ==
Berti was born into a family of farmers and shepherds in San Piero a Sieve, Italy. He showed an interest in art at an early age and at age seventeen he found work at Richard-Ginori where he could devote himself to the design of porcelain products. The writer Ugo Ojetti, had the opportunity to see some of Berti's works in clay, and advised his father Angiolo to enroll him at the Santa Croce Institute of Art in Florence. From this began Berti's artistic career, and his first participation in the Venice Biennale and the Rome Quadriennale.

=== Sculptures ===
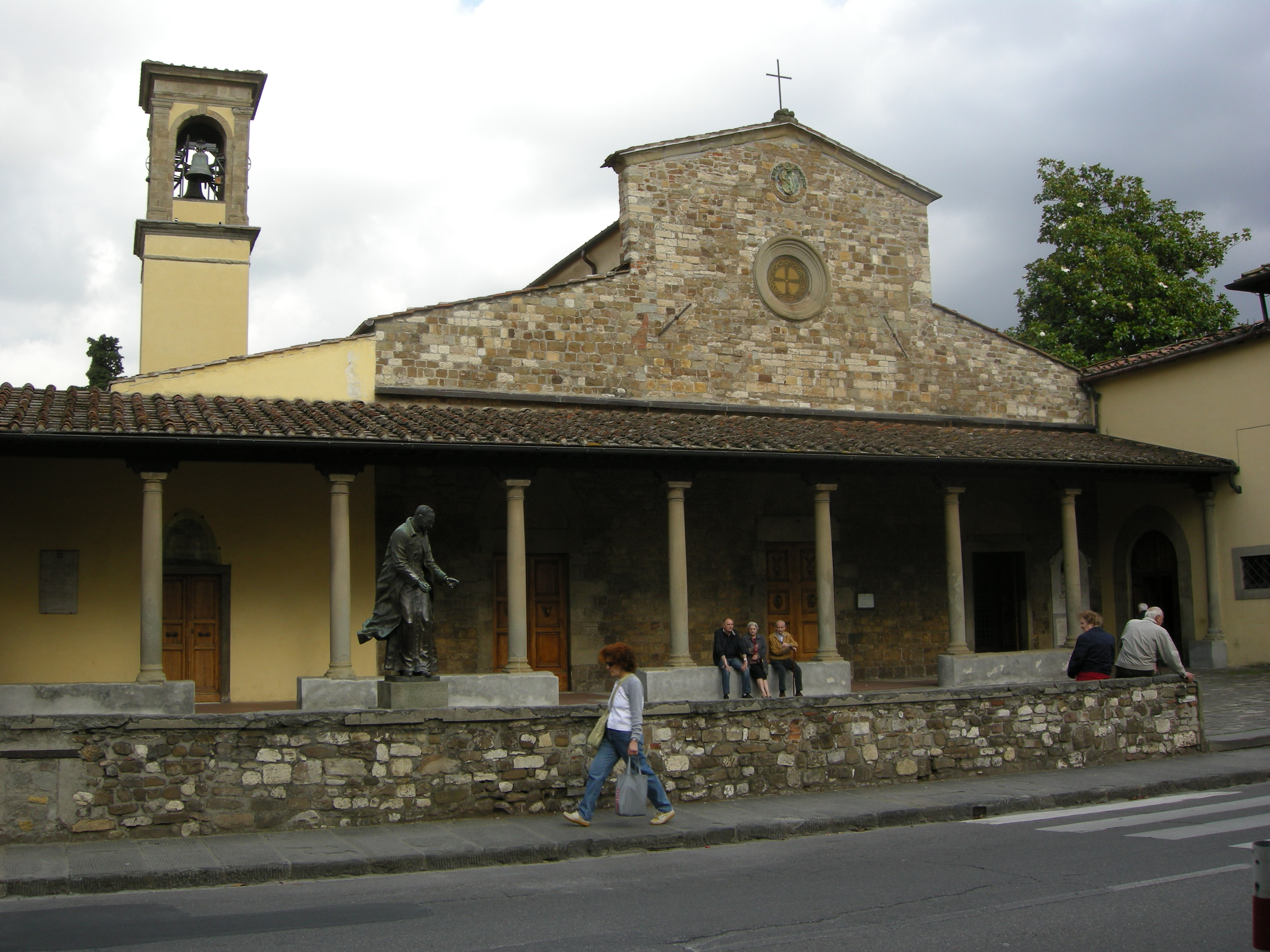
Santo Stefano church in Pane in Florence with a statue of Giulio Facibeni in front

Berti devoted himself mainly to portraiture by sculpting busts. He was commissioned to make statues for the monument to Ugo Foscolo located in the Basilica of Santa Croce. He created busts of various members of the Italian royal family (Victor Emmanuel III, Marie-José of Belgium, etc.). He also sculpted busts of Mussolini, Paola Ojetti, and the American billionaires Barbara Hutton and Susanna Agnelli. His portraits of the writer and designer Enrico Sacchetti and Amadeo of Aosta are also of considerable artistic value.

Berti designed the bronze casket used to house the wooden coffin of Pope Pius XI.

=== Monuments ===
After the Second World War, Berti was commissioned to create monuments to many famous people, including to Alcide De Gasperi in Trento (working with Sergio Benvenuti). He also spent time as the official sculptor of the Holy See. During this time he sculpted Pius XII in Rome and Louise de Marillac in St. Peter's Basilica. He created the bronze statue of Giulio Facibeni on the square in front of the Chiesa di Santo Stefano in Pane in Florence, the statue of Benedetta Bianchi Porro in Dovadola (in the Province of Forlì-Cesena), and the bronze statue of Guglielmo Marconi made in 1974 in the park of Villa Griffone in Sasso Marconi.

Berti created the portal for the Castellammare Cathedral in Castellammare di Stabia and the monument to Elena of Montenegro, erected in Messina, in memory of the relief work of the sovereign during the earthquake that devastated the city. He also sculpted a monument to Padre Pio and one to Aldo Moro in his hometown of Maglie. The Moro bust was made after his death from his sketches.

=== Medals and coins ===
Berti also made a name for himself as a designer of medals and coins. In the Vatican Museums (Collection of Modern Religious Art) there is a bronze Christ from 1972. In the 1980s Berti made some commemorative medals, commissioned by Rodolfo Siviero, for the inauguration of the exhibition of works found after the war. He sculpted an image of men harvesting grain featured on the FAO 1982 Calendar medal.

Berti loved Italian music and was friends with the conductor Arturo Toscanini, for whom he minted "Triptych of the Silver Medals to commemorate the twentieth anniversary of the death of Arturo Toscanini".

In May 2014, on the occasion of the bicentenary of the Carabinieri, the 1973 Berti work Carabinieri patrol in the storm was recast and placed in Rome in the garden of Church of Saint Andrew's at the Quirinal.

=== Teaching ===
Berti taught at the Accademia di Belle Arti in Florence, where he mentored other sculptors. Among his students were American sculptor Frank Varga.

== Gallery ==
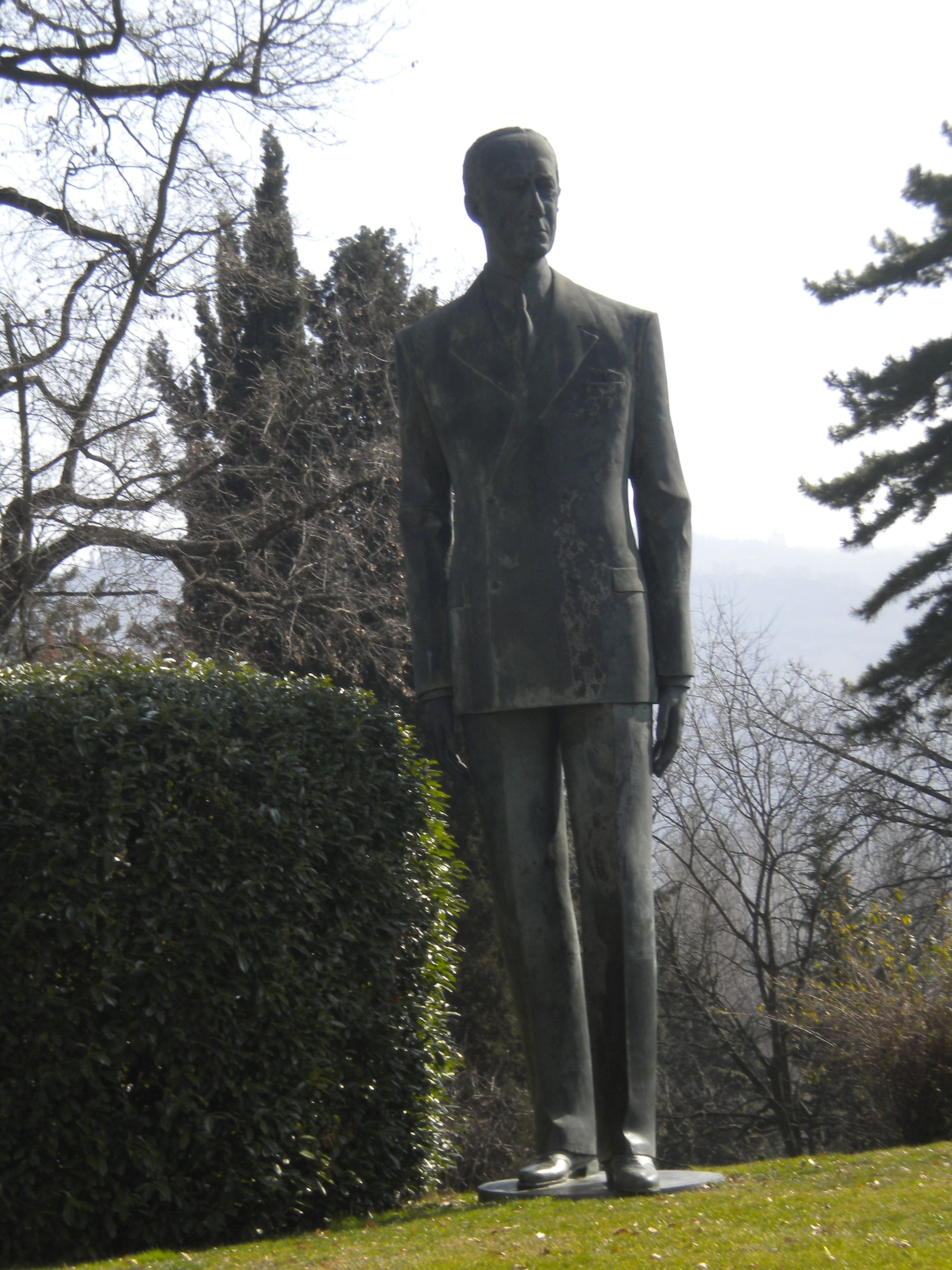
Guglielmo Marconi (1974) Villa Griffone park in Sasso Marconi

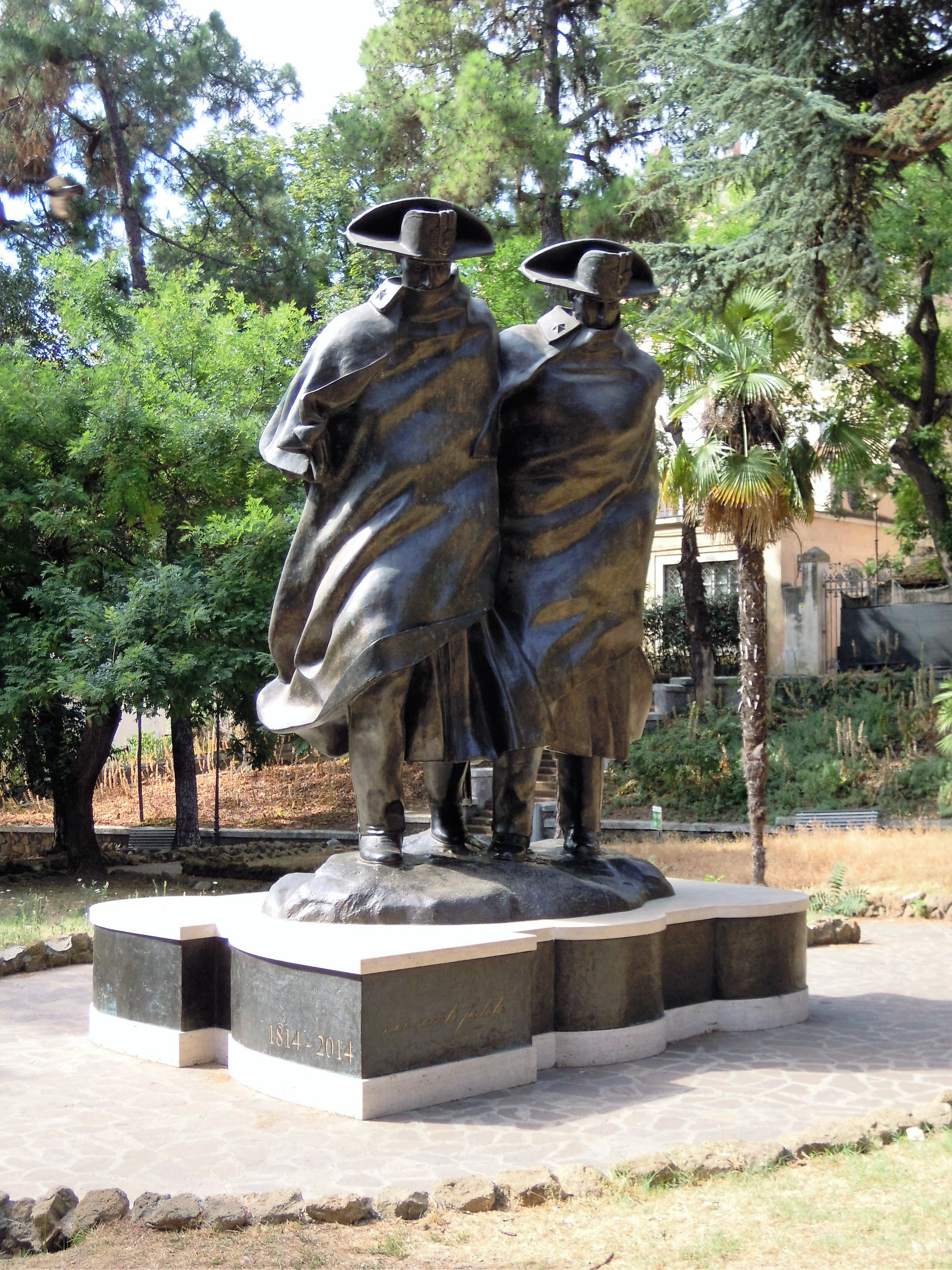
Carabinieri patrol in the blizzard (2014). Garden of S. Andrea al Quirinale, Rome

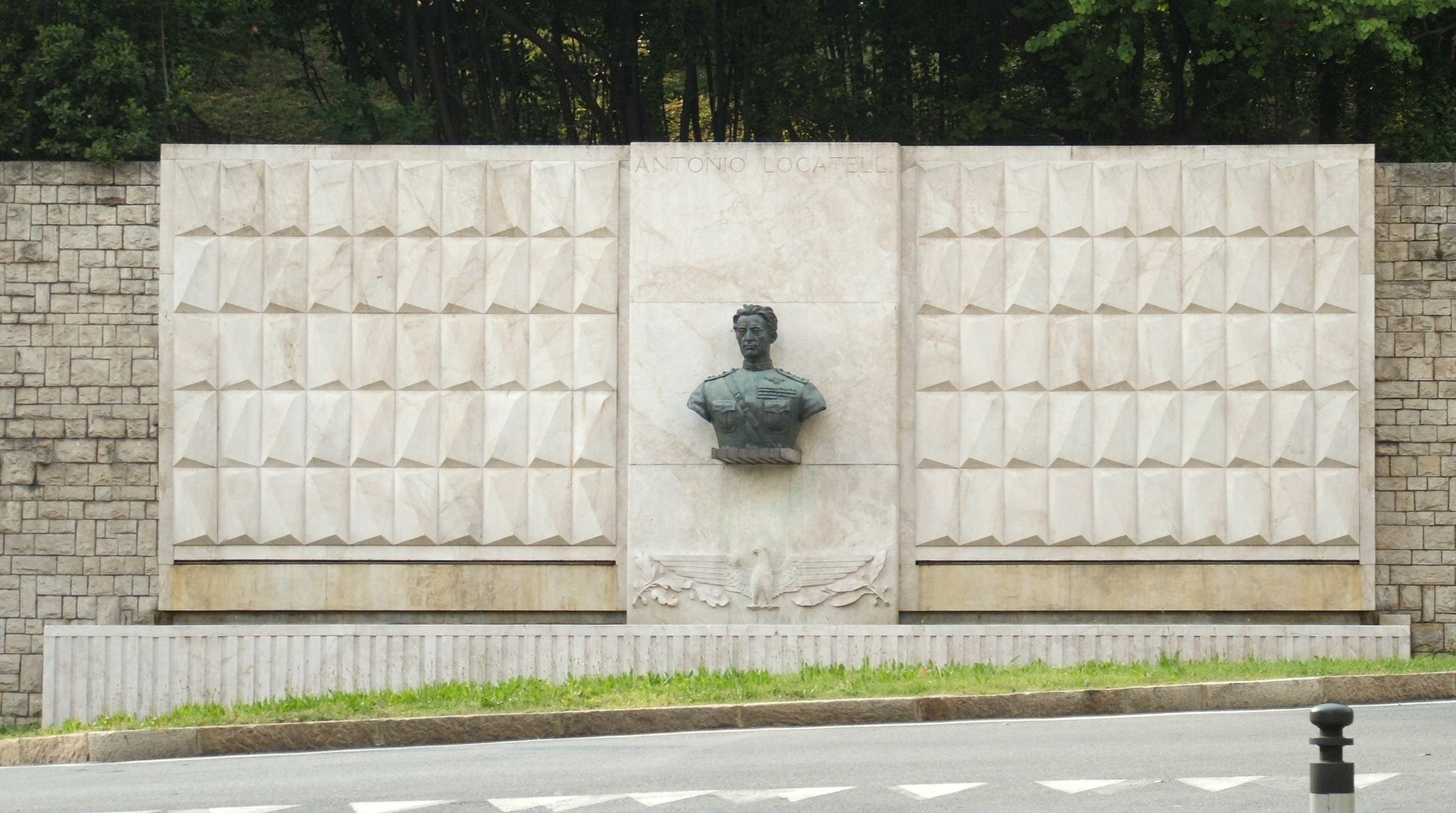
Bergamo - Lombardy - Italy, Monument to Antonio Locatelli (1895-1936), aviator

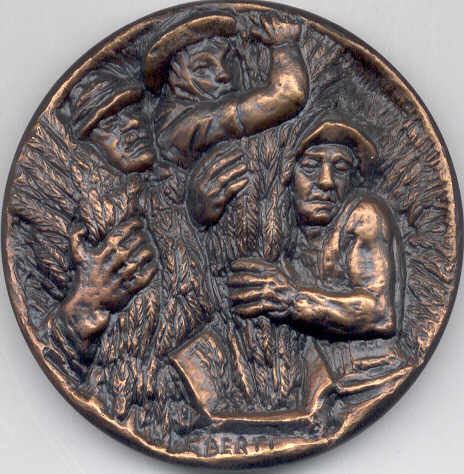
FAO Calendar Medal for 1982 (Bronze Obverse)
