= Bust of Robert Burns (Houston) =

Sculpture in Houston, Texas, U.S.

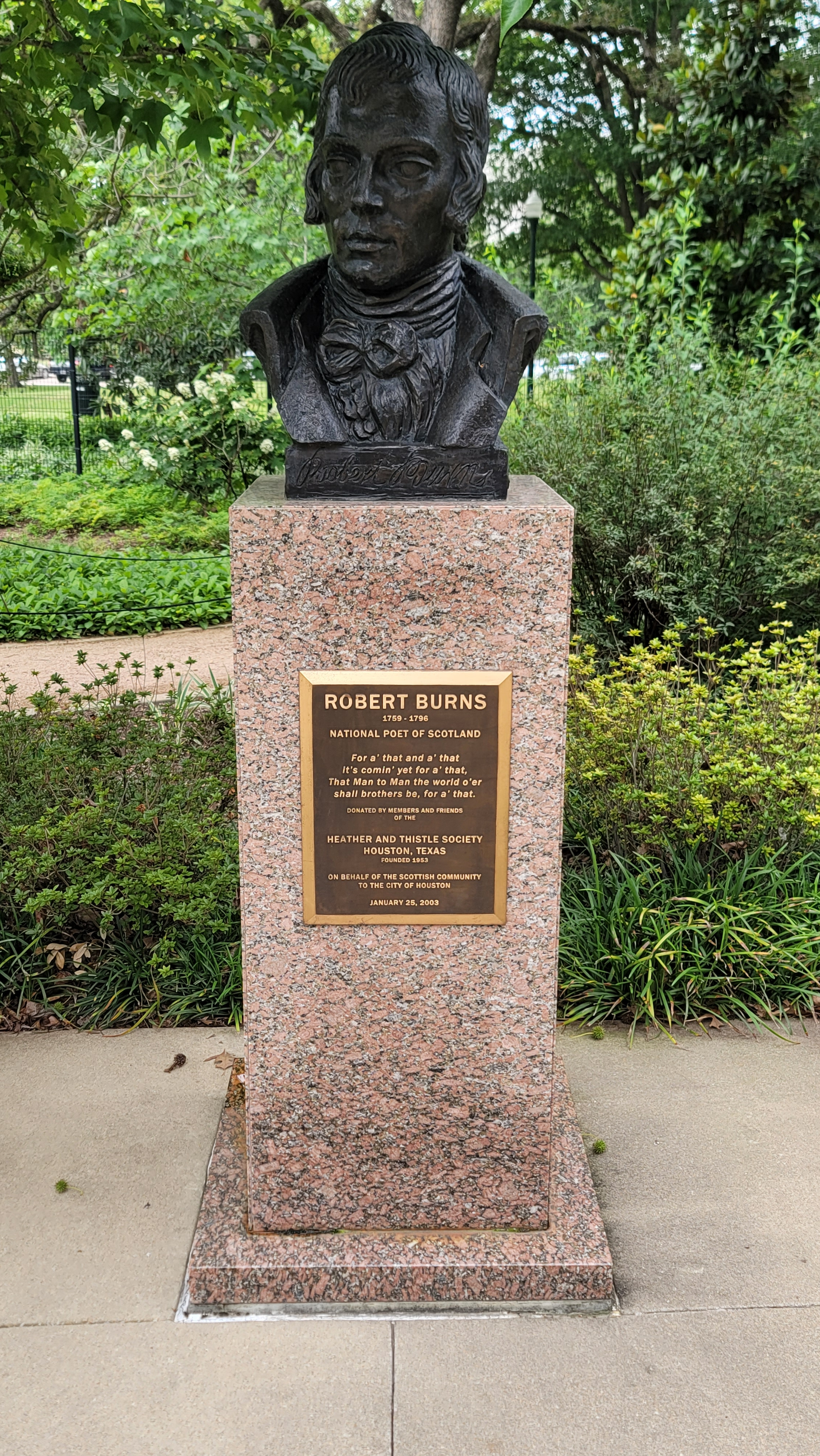
- Bust of Robert Burns pictured in May 2023
- Artist: Ferenc Varga
- Type: Sculpture
- Medium: Bronze
- Subject: Robert Burns
- Location: Houston, Texas, United States; 29°43′18.8″N 95°23′17.4″W

An outdoor bronze sculpture of the poet Robert Burns by Hungarian-American artist Ferenc Varga is installed in Hermann Park's McGovern Centennial Gardens in Houston, Texas, United States. The bust was placed in Hermann Park in 2002.

== See also ==
- List of public art in Houston
