= City Employees War Memorial =

War memorial in New York City

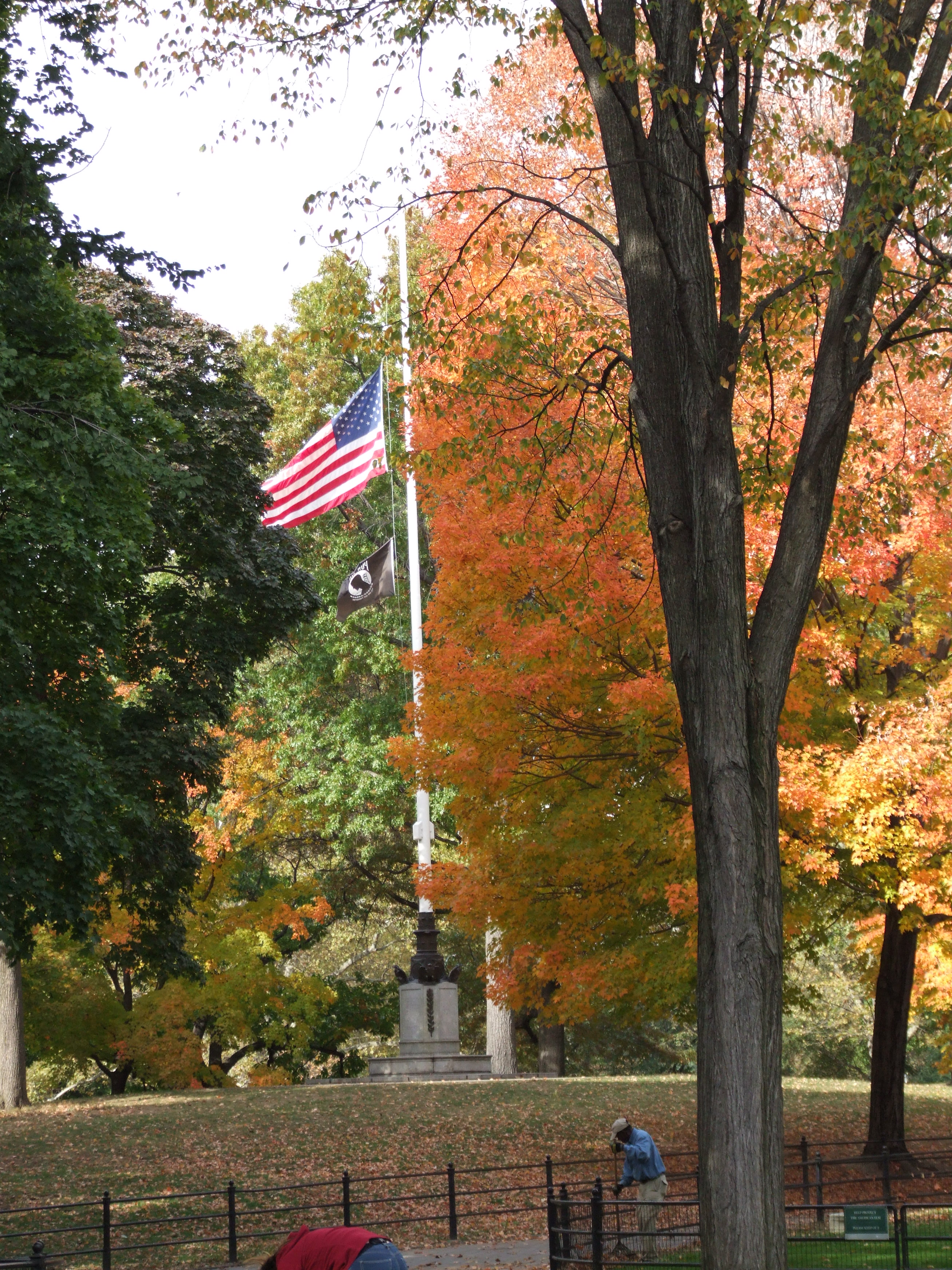
- The monument in 2008
- Interactive map of City Employees War Memorial
- Location: Central Park, New York City, New York, United States
- Coordinates: 40°46′24″N 73°58′19″W
- Designer: Georg J. Lober (sculptor); Otto F. Langmann (architect)
- Type: Flagpole
- Material: Bronze; Granite; Steel
- Length: 7 feet 6 inches (2.29 m)
- Width: 7 feet 6 inches (2.29 m)
- Height: 90 feet (27 m)
- Dedicated date: November 11, 1926
- Dedicated to: Municipal employees of New York City who fought in wars

The City Employees War Memorial is a monument in New York City's Central Park. It consists of a steel flagpole atop a stylized pedestal made of granite and bronze. Georg J. Lober served as the monument's sculptor, while Otto F. Langmann served as the project's architect. It was dedicated on November 11, 1926 (Armistice Day) in honor of the municipal employees of New York City who had fought in wars.

== Design ==
The monument consists of a steel flagpole rising from a pedestal made of granite and bronze. It has a height of 90 feet (27 meters), while the pedestal has a square base with side measurements of 7 feet 6 inches (2.29 m). The pedestal consists of a granite base, made of stone quarried from Deer Isle, Maine, surmounted by a bronze sleeve which the flagpole is affixed to. The base and sleeve have heights of 6 feet 1 inch (1.85 m) and 4 feet 11 inches (1.50 m), respectively. The sleeve bears four medallions in relief, depicting the Great Seal of the United States, the seal of New York City, and the seals of the United States Army and United States Navy. The granite base is also surmounted by four bronze eagle statuettes. Additional designs include several laurel branches and oak garlands. The base bears the following two inscriptions:

IN / COMMEMORATION / OF THE HEROISM / AND SACRIFICES / OF THE / CITY EMPLOYEES / WHO FOUGHT / IN THE / VARIOUS WARS / OF THE / UNITED STATES

PRESENTED BY / MRS. CHARLES / AUGUSTINE ROBINSON / NATIONAL FLAG-LADY / OF THE VETERANS OF / FOREIGN WARS OF / THE UNITED STATES

The monument is located near the Naumburg Bandshell in the Central Park Mall, atop a knoll. Given its proximity to the bandshell, the location was sometimes referred to as Music Hill.

== History ==
=== Creation and dedication ===
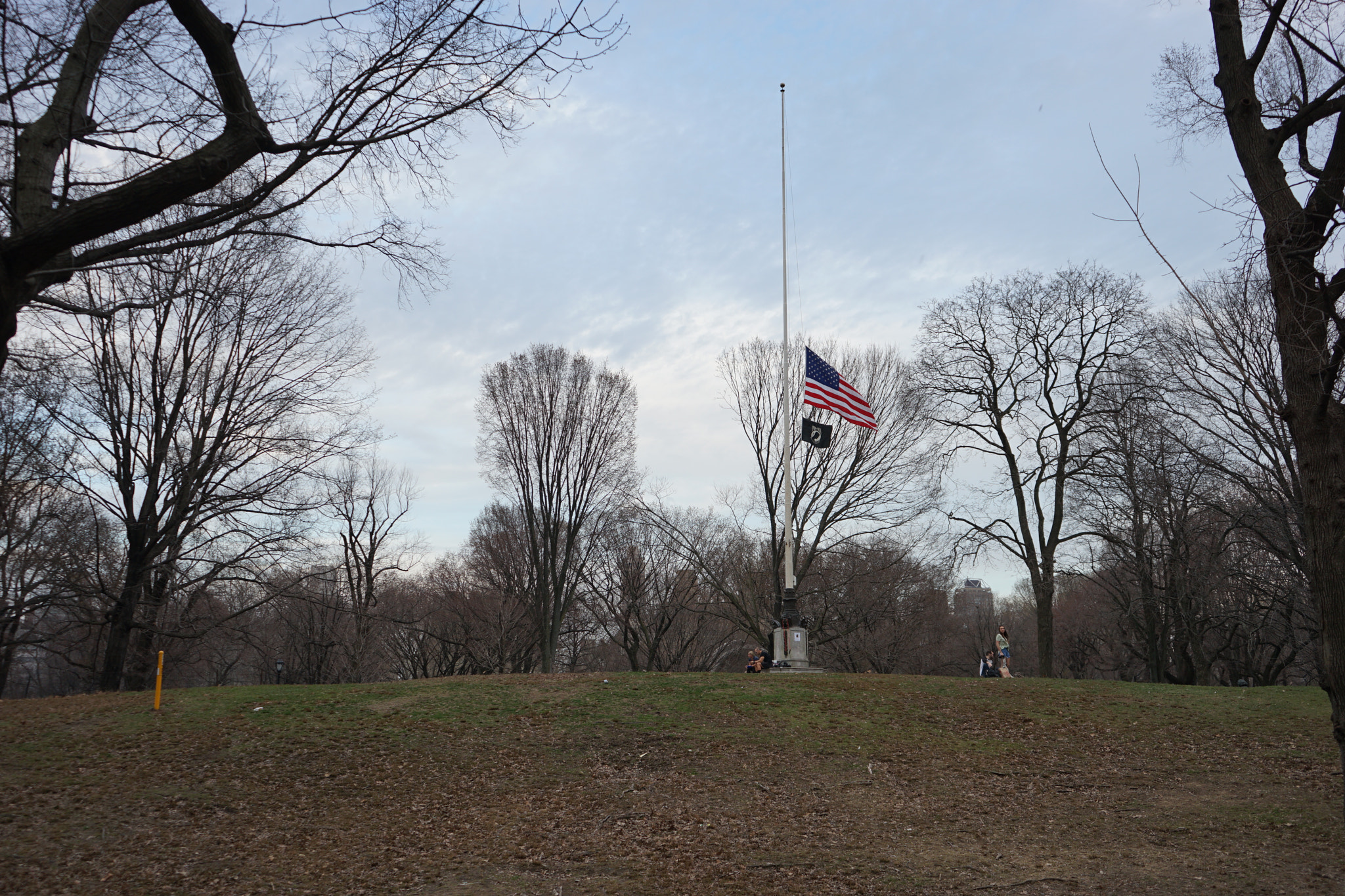
The monument and surrounding area in 2016, with the flags at half-staff

The monument, which was initially dedicated to municipal employees of New York City who had died in World War I, was commissioned by Nellie Robinson (1862–1944). She was the wife of wealthy businessman Charles A. Robinson and was a leader of the Woman's Relief Corps. During her lifetime, she was well known for her efforts to provide flags of the United States to various buildings, ships, and cities, and because of this she was known as the "National Flag Lady of the VFW" (Veterans of Foreign Wars). Georg J. Lober, an artist who designed the nearby statue of Hans Christian Andersen in the park, served as the project's sculptor, while Otto F. Langmann served as the project's architect. The groundbreaking for the monument was performed in July 1926 by Charles Pelot Summerall, a major general who had served in the war. It was dedicated on November 11, 1926 (Armistice Day).

=== Later history ===
For several years, the monument served as a common gathering spot for VFW members in New York City for Armistice Day celebrations, with some celebrations featuring up to 1,000 participants. However, by the 1970s, the surrounding area of the Central Park Mall had become a well-known area for the illegal drug trade, with one drug dealer using the monument's eagle statuettes as a hiding place for his drugs. In 1976, this individual found that the statuettes had become loosened from their base and stole two of them, while the other two also became missing. This occurred during a wave of similar monument thefts citywide, with former New York City Department of Parks and Recreation commissioner Adrian Benepe telling The New York Times in 2008 that several statues were stolen with the intent to be sold as scrap metal. In the 1990s, the drug dealer sold the two statuettes to a local jeweler, and around 2000, the city replaced all of the statuettes on the monument with replicas. In May 2008, following a confession from the drug dealer during a federal prosecution, authorities were able to recover the stolen statuettes. The statuettes were subsequently handed over the city's parks and recreation department.

== See also ==
- List of World War I monuments and memorials
- Public art in Central Park
