= Ferenc Varga (sculptor) =

Hungarian-born American sculptor

- Born: May 9, 1906; Székesfehérvár, Hungary
- Died: September 3, 1989 (aged 83); Florida, US
- Spouse: Anna Pázman Varga
- Partner: Frank Varga
- Website: Sculptures by Varga Sculpturing Studio

Ferenc Varga (May 9, 1906 – September 3, 1989) was a Hungarian-born sculptor who emigrated to the United States after World War II. He worked on many public commissions, and his sculptures are in the collections of museums and galleries around the world. In 1979 he was awarded a gold medal by the Accademia Italia delle Arti del Lavoro. His only child is the noted artist, Frank Varga.

== Background ==
Varga showed artistic talent at a young age. Encouraged by his parents, he started painting at age ten. Due to his talent, he enrolled in the Academy of Fine Arts where he studied under Jenő Bory and Ferenc Sidló. After graduating from college, he was a teaching assistant under Bory and taught from 1928 until 1940.

Varga's initial success as a sculptor came in 1926. He won the Grand Prize at a nationwide art exhibition with a marble statue entitled "Eva". He was then commissioned to create the World War I memorial in Piszke. Archduke Joseph August of Austria attended its unveiling on November 2, 1930. In 1928 he received an award from Lord Rothermere which he used to study sculpture in Italy. While in Italy, the Italian government purchased some of his statues.

After his return home, he worked with Cistercian teacher Elemér Schwartz and started a series of religious statues for Hungarian churches as part of the "Betlehemes Mozgalom" (English: Nativity Movement). He was commissioned to create other World War I monuments in Kiskunfélegyháza and Satu Mare. His 1939 sculpture entitled "St. Stephen and His Disciple" can still be seen in the Cistercian Grammar School in Székesfehérvár, and he made a sculpture of St. Imre that resides in Győr. In 1940 he won the Balló Scholarship, won the first prize of the Gábor Áron sculpture competition, and was elected to the St. Istvan Academy Of Arts, Letters and Sciences.

He emigrated from Hungary in 1948, first living in Belgium, then in Canada. In 1951, Varga's family joined him in Windsor, Ontario, Canada, where he had established a studio. From Windsor, the family moved across the river to Detroit.

In Detroit, he worked on many public commissions although at first he had a hard time restarting his fine arts career. In 1970, he moved his studio to Florida, where he continued to work and teach. In 1979 he was awarded a gold medal by the Accademia Italia delle Arti del Lavoro. Varga's works are in private collections, public commissions, and commissions for religious, private institutions, museums and galleries.

In 1977, Varga was featured in the National Sculpture Review as part of its issue highlighting foreign-born artists. Varga mentored other artists, like Ruth Hutton Ancker.

== Selected works ==
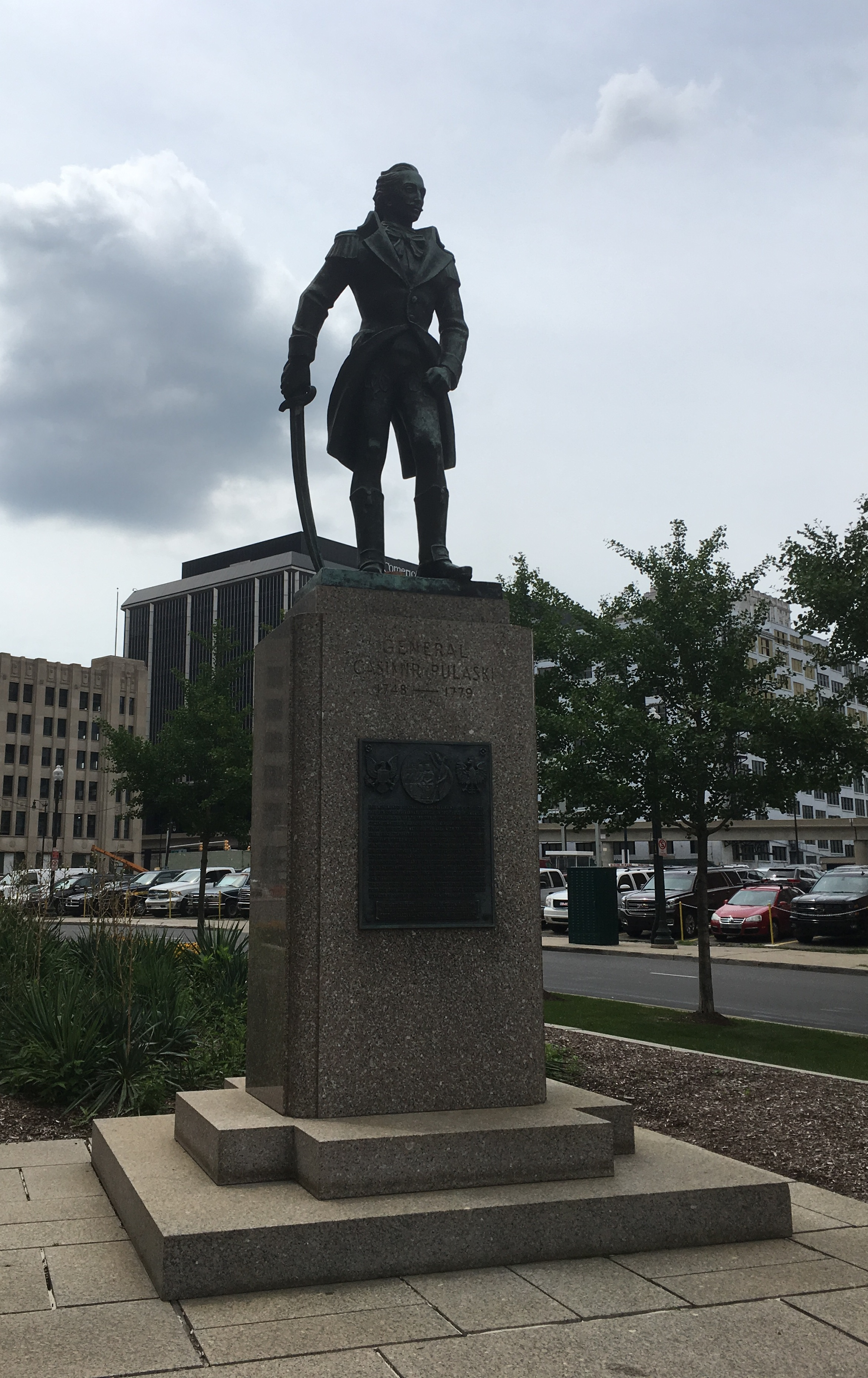
Casimir Pulaski statue in Detroit

Varga's works have been collected by the Hungarian National Museum, the Museum of Fine Arts, the Hungarian National Gallery, as well as the Vatican, Italian, Swiss and Belgian museums. Over the course of his career, Varga created hundreds of works.

- Saint Stephen and his disciple (Carrara marble) – 1939, St. Stephen High School, Székesfehérvár, Hungary
- Saint Emeric of Hungary (Szent Imre) (limestone) – 1940, Győr, Hungary
- World War I Memorial (bronze) – 1940, Kiskunfélegyháza, Hungary
- World War I Memorial (limestone) – 1930, Lábatlan-Piszke, Hungary
- Saint Stephen (marble) – 1958, Toledo, Ohio, US
- Bust of Robert Burns, Houston
- Nicolaus Copernicus bust, Detroit, Michigan
- "Peace", a figure of Christ for the Allegheny Cemetery in Pittsburgh, Pennsylvania
- Saint Joseph relief for St. Joseph Church, Wyandotte, Michigan
- The "Good Shepherd" for Fort Lincoln Cemetery in Brentwood, Maryland
- "Queen of Heaven" for the Queen of Heaven Cemetery in Chicago, Illinois
- Saint Francis and other figures in stone and mahogany for the St. Francis Retreat House in DeWitt, Michigan
- Casimir Pulaski Monument in Detroit, Michigan
- Pieta for St. Juliana Convent in Detroit, Michigan
- Pope John Paul II statue in Detroit, Michigan
- Saint Stephen of Hungary at St. Emery's Church, Fairfield, Connecticut
