= Jenő Bory =

Hungarian architect and sculptor

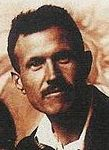
- Born: 9 November 1879; Székesfehérvár, Hungary
- Died: 20 December 1959 (aged 80); Székesfehérvár, Hungary

Jenő Bory (Székesfehérvár, 9 November 1879 – Székesfehérvár, 20 December 1959) was a Hungarian architect and sculptor.

== Background ==
Bory received his degree in building engineering in Budapest in 1903. He enrolled in the Academy of Fine Arts to study sculpture under Alajos Stróbl. At this time he met his wife, Ilona Komocsin (1885–1974), who became a notable painter after finishing her studies in Szeged. During World War I as a soldier he was appointed as an official war artist in Sarajevo for which he received the Order of Franz Josef. He taught at the Academy of Fine Arts (1911–46) and at the Technical University (1921–44). He was rector of the academy between 1943 and 1945.

He was largely responsible for the building of the so-called Bory castle in Székesfehérvár which is decorated by his and his wife's works. He built this fantastic, castle-like structure out of concrete with his own hands for 41 years.

Sculptor Ferenc Varga apprenticed under Bory.

== Gallery ==
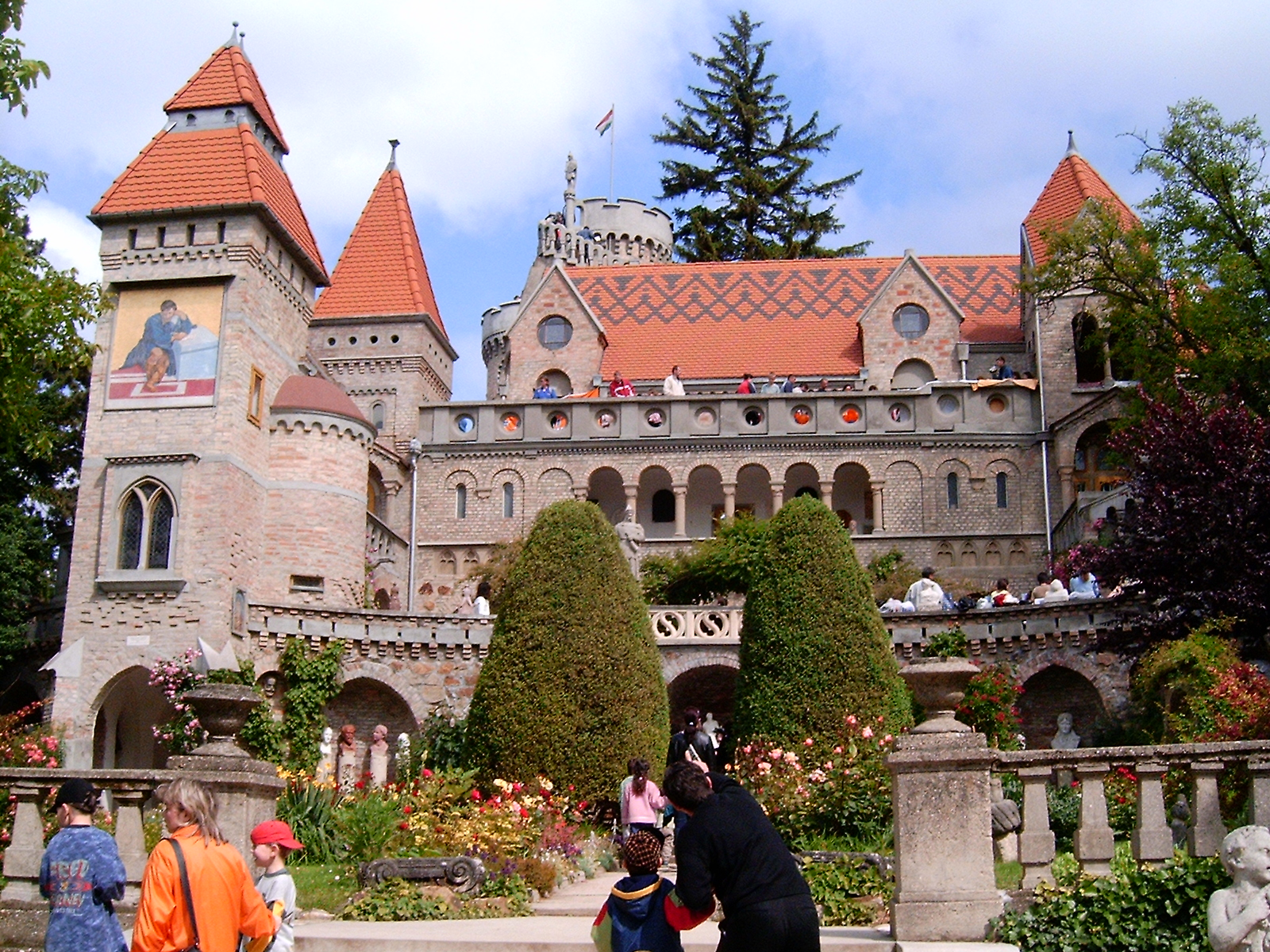
Bory Castle in Székesfehérvár

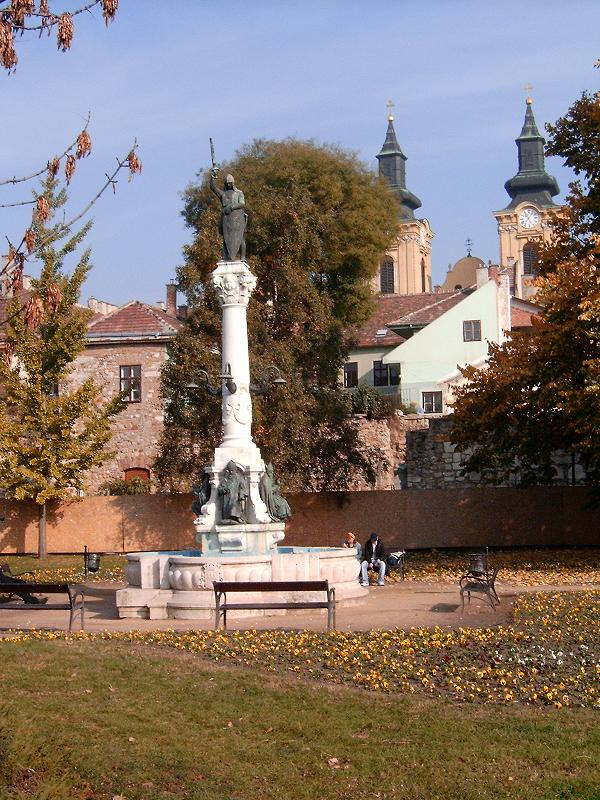
Column by Bory in Székesfehérvár

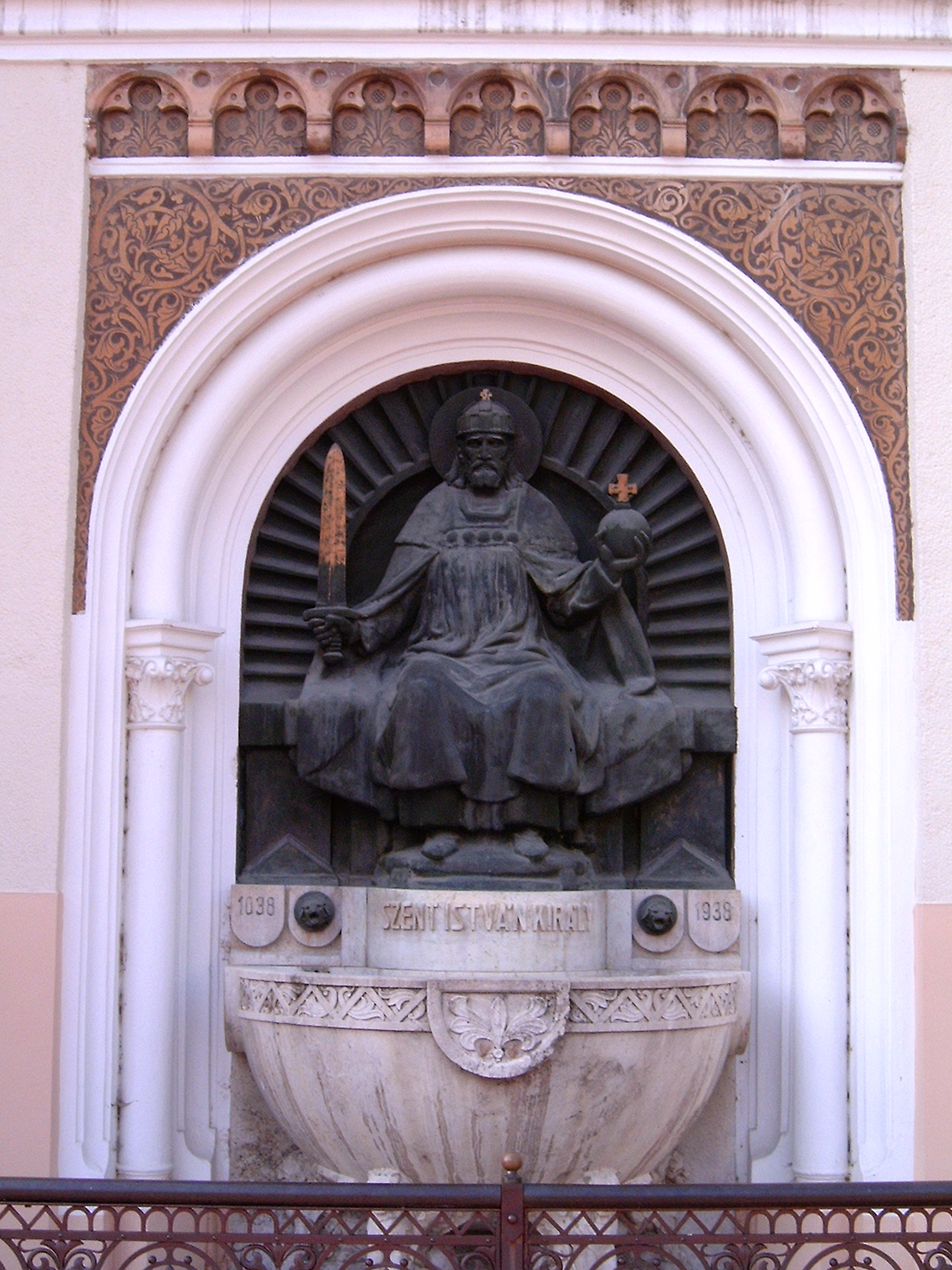
St Stephen's well in Kaposvar, part of Our Lady Church
