= Frank Varga =

Hungarian-American sculptor (1943–2018)

- Born: Ferenc Csaba Varga; June 18, 1943; Budapest, Hungary
- Died: April 14, 2018 (aged 74); Delray Beach, Florida, US
- Education: Accademia di Belle Arti di Firenze BFA, University of Honolulu
- Spouse: Joanne Flanagan Varga
- Partner(s): Ferenc (Steve) Stephen Varga, and Michael Vincent Varga
- Website: Sculptures by Varga Sculpturing Studio

Frank Varga (born Ferenc Csaba Varga; June 18, 1943 – April 14, 2018) was a Hungarian-American sculptor. He was the only child of the artist Ferenc Varga and his wife Anna Pázman Varga.

== Biography ==
Varga was born in Budapest, Hungary. In 1951, when he was eight years old, Varga's family emigrated from Hungary to Windsor, Ontario, Canada, where the elder Varga had already established a studio. From Windsor, the family moved across the river to Detroit. From an early age, Frank worked in his father's studio, learning his craft. He served as an apprentice on many of his father's works. In 1964 Varga attended the Accademia di Belle Arti in Florence, where he studied under Italian sculptor, Antonio Berti. He also discovered a love of Italy.

In 1970 he established his own studio in Grosse Pointe, Michigan. At this time, he began to teach the art of sculpting. In 1983 he moved to Delray Beach, Florida, to take over his father's studio. Every year, Varga traveled to Carrara in Italy with his students to help them learn to sculpt in marble. Varga served as a mentor to many younger artists.

Varga's works are in private collections, but he also accepted a number of public commissions. He also accepted commissions for religious and private institutions, museums and galleries.

In 2018, Varga was honored with a review of his work at the Cornell Museum of Art in Delray Beach. After his death, Varga's son Michael took over the operation of the studio, continuing the family tradition.

== Selected works ==
Over the course of his career, Varga created hundreds of works.

- The Hurricane (1976), Belle Glade, Florida
- Auswandererdenkmal (1986), Bremerhaven
- Barefoot mailman statue at Hillsboro Inlet Light
- General Alexander Macomb in Detroit

== Gallery ==
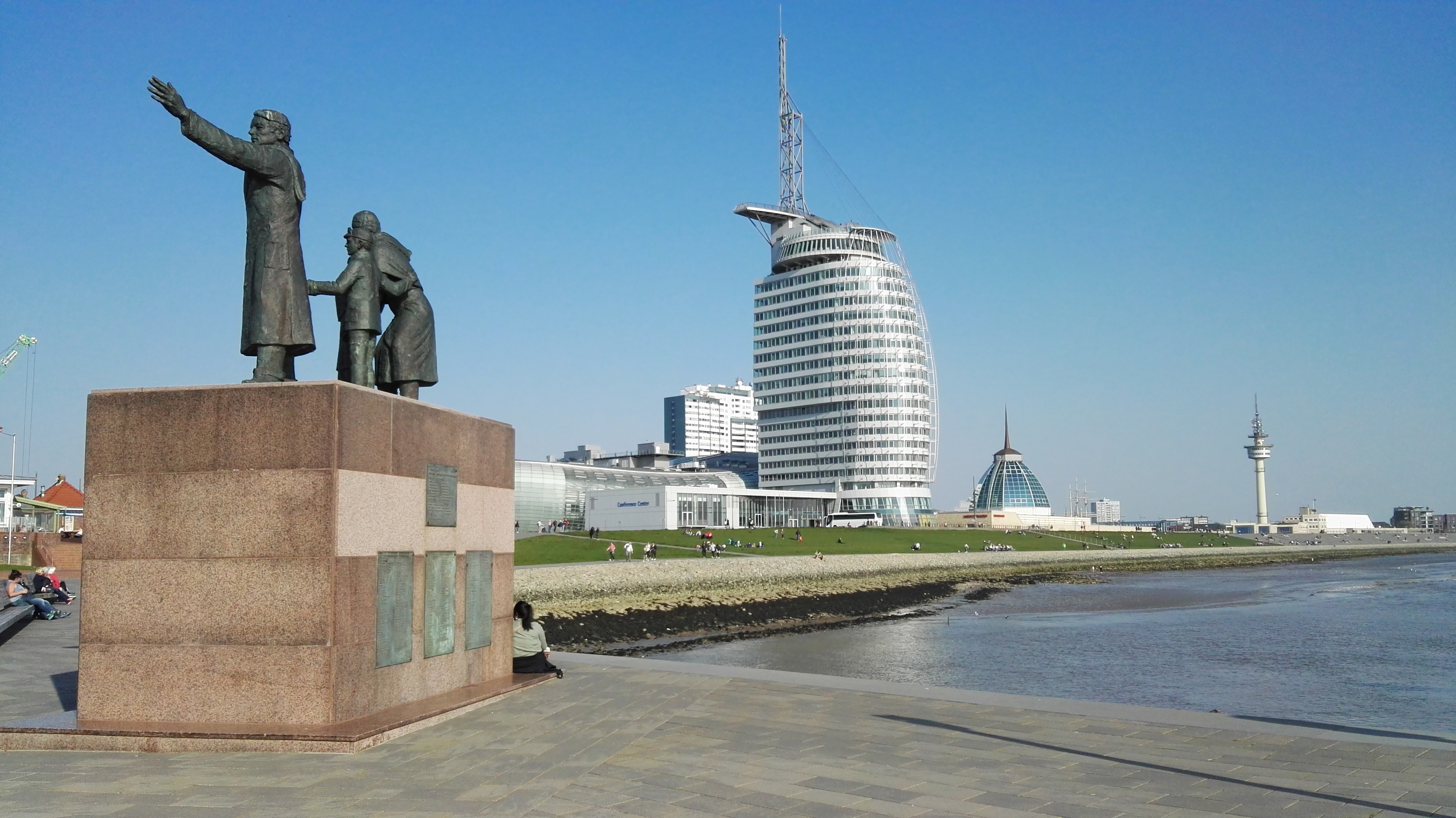
Das Auswandererdenkmal in Bremerhaven

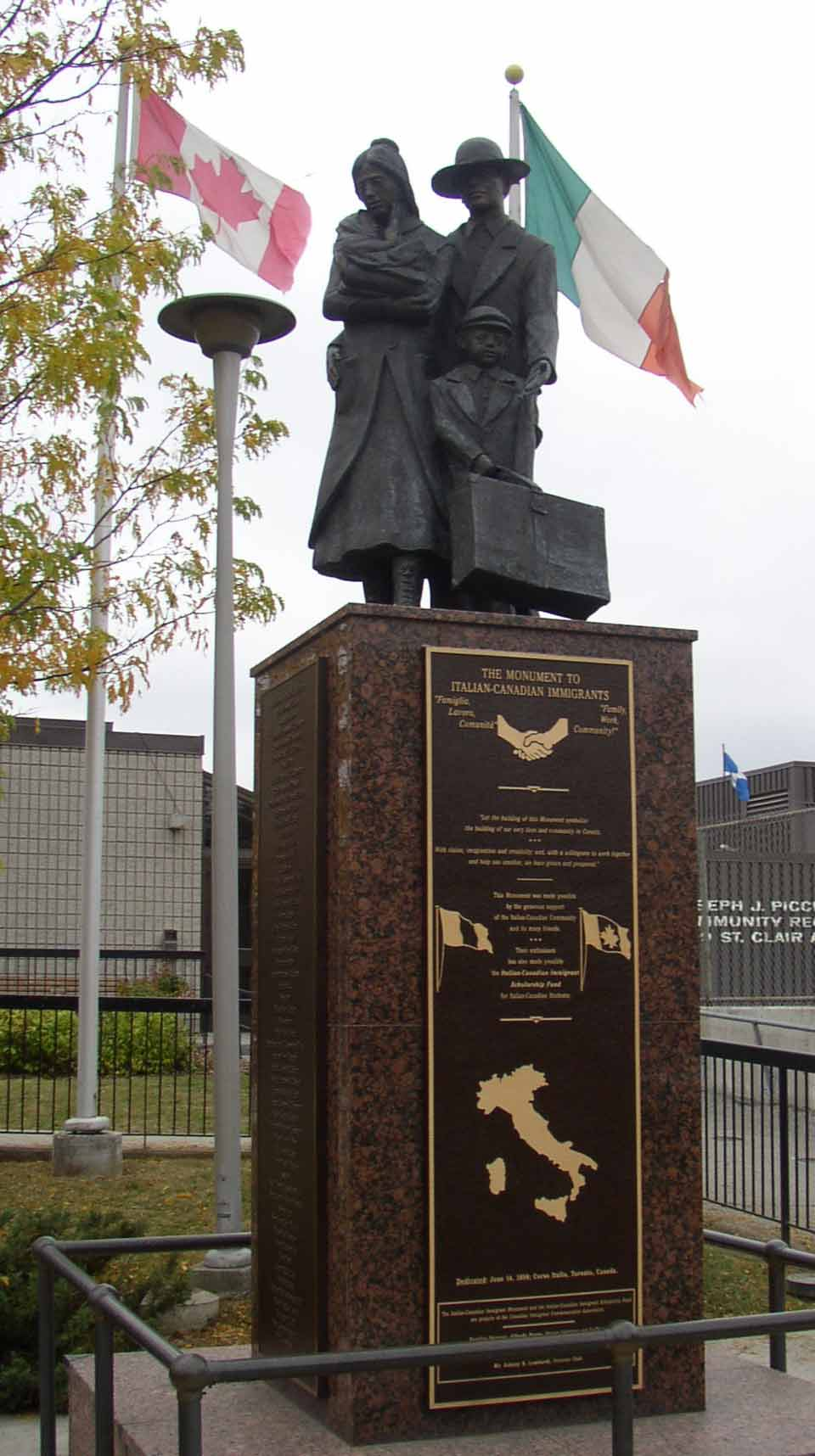
Italian Immigrants to Canada
