= German Emigration Center =

Museum in Bremerhaven, Germany

Coordinates: 53°32′43″N 8°34′27″E

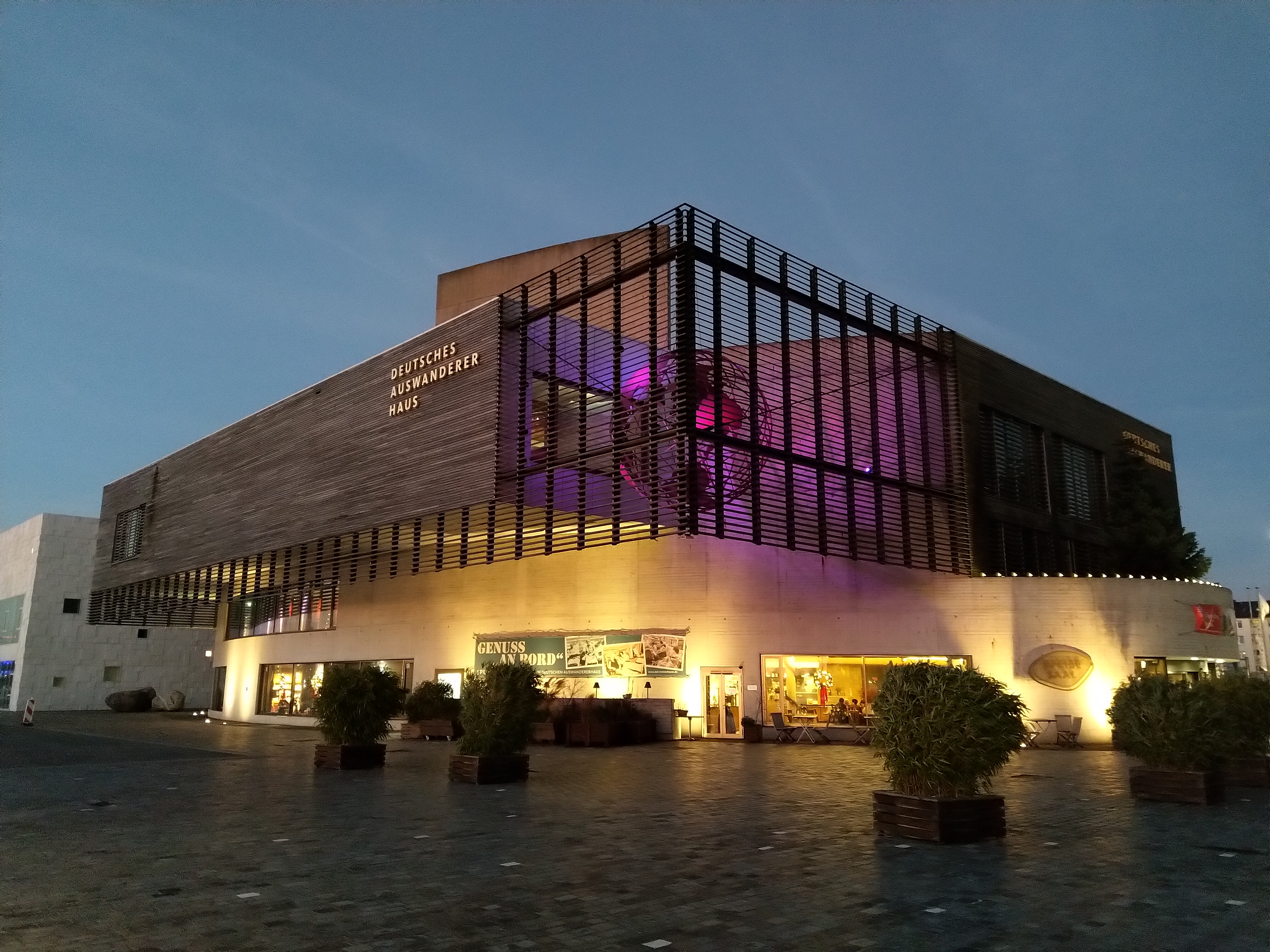
German Emigration Center

German Emigration Center, Bremerhaven

The German Emigration Center (German: Deutsches Auswandererhaus) is a museum located in Bremerhaven, Germany dedicated to the history of German emigration, especially to the United States. It is Europe's largest theme museum about emigration. Visitors can experience the emigration process through interactive exhibits. The museum also provides access to databases of immigration records.

The museum opened on August 8, 2005.
