= German-American Heritage Foundation of the USA =

Non-profit in the United States

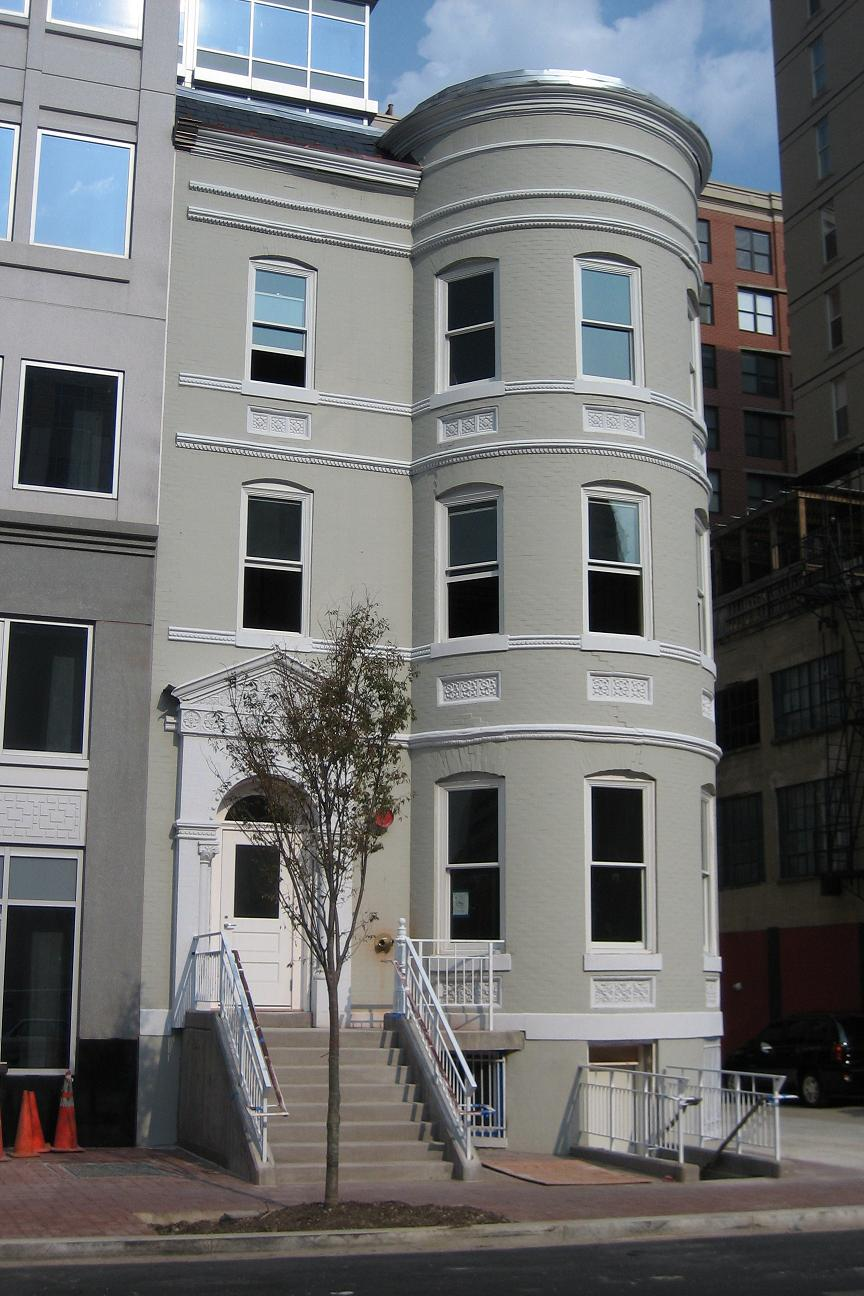
Hockemeyer Hall - National Headquarters

The German-American Heritage Foundation of the USA (GAHFUSA) is a national non-profit organization that promotes the German language, culture, and heritage in the United States and works toward preserving the history of Americans of German ancestry who helped build the United States. It is a national membership organization through which Americans of German heritage and language work together on issues of common concern. The organization's national headquarters are in Washington, D.C.

The German-American Heritage Foundation was established as the United German-American Committee of the USA in 1977.

Each year since President Ronald Reagan first declared October 6 German-American Day in 1987, GAHFUSA has petitioned the White House, United States Congress, and state and local governments to issue national and statewide proclamations.

On October 17, 2008, the German-American Heritage Foundation acquired Hockemeyer Hall to establish the first national German-American Heritage Museum of the USA. Through supporters and fundraising, the GAHF was able to renovate the interior and exterior of the old townhouse, which opened in March 2010.

== Notable "Distinguished German-Americans" ==
The organization honors the outstanding contributions of Americans of German descent through its Distinguished German-American of the Year Award, which it presents at the annual Council of 1000 Award and Fundraising Gala. Notable awardees have included:

- 1989: Werner Fricker
- 1990: Eric Braeden
- 1992: Heinz C. Prechter
- 2005: Günter Blobel
- 2006: H. Norman Schwarzkopf
- 2008: Jesco von Puttkamer
- 2009: William R. Timken
- 2010: Paul Volcker
- 2011: Robert Zoellick
- 2015: Doug Oberhelman
- 2016: Philip Anschutz
- 2018: Peter Thiel

== See also ==
- German-American Heritage Museum of the USA
- Americans of German descent
- List of German Americans
- German in the United States
- Auswanderer Denkmal
- German-Americans in the Civil War
- German inventors and discoverers
