= Inalfa =

Inalfa Roof Systems is a tier-One automotive supplier serving over 40 vehicle brands globally, including Daimler Benz, BMW, Chrysler, Ford, General Motors, Volkswagen, Audi, Volvo, Hyundai, Kia, Honda, Land Rover, and Nissan. The company delivers more than 2.5 million roof modules annually specializing in complex automotive sunroof and reconfigurable roof systems — designing, developing, manufacturing, prototyping, testing, assembling and supplying sunroof modules.

The company is headquartered in Venray, Netherlands, as a wholly owned subsidiary of Beijing Hainachuan Automotive Parts Co., Ltd. (BHAP), headquartered in Beijing, China.

== History ==
Established by J.A.M. Burgman in Utrecht, Netherlands in 1946, Inalfa manufactured of aluminium household supplies including knitting needles, stair rods and curtain rods. The company moved in 1956 to Venray where it also manufactured metal profiles, stamped metal parts and oil furnaces.

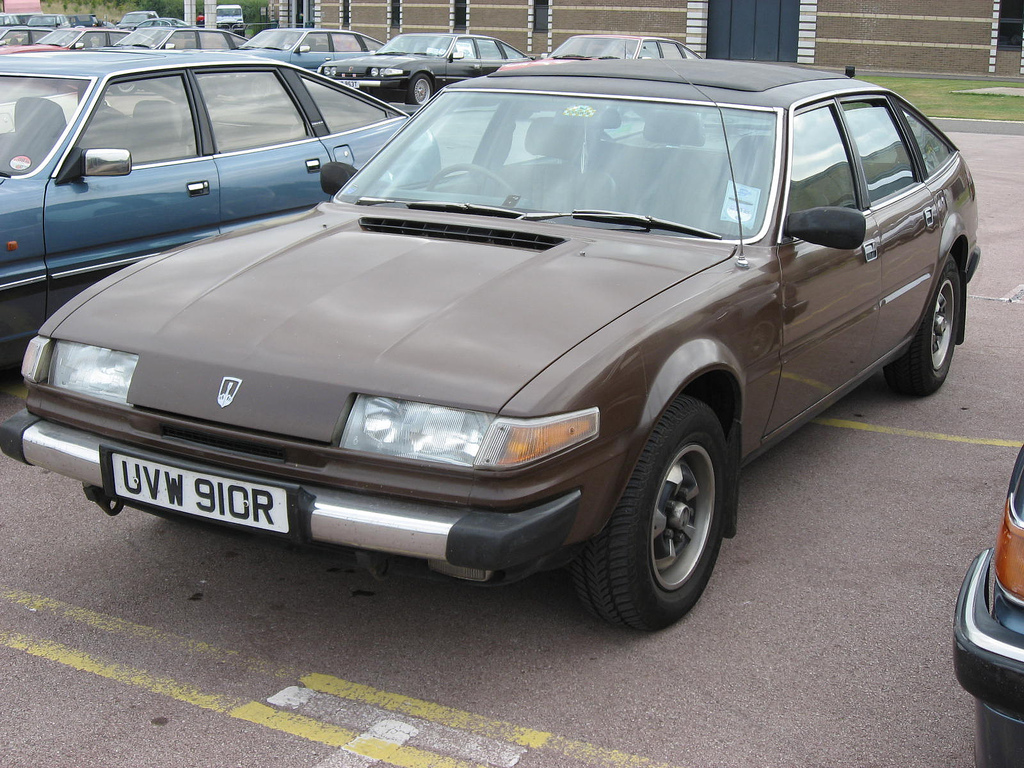
Rover SD1 with folding roof, one of the first vehicles to use an Inalfa sunroof

In 1974 the company began manufacturing automotive sunroofs, initially for Jaguar and Rover, by 2011 had been owned by two leading Northern European mid-market buyout firms, AAC Capital Partners and its co-shareholder Parcom Capital; and in that year became a wholly owned subdivision of Beijing Hiananchuan Automotive Parts (BHAP).

As a global automotive provider, Inalfa is known for marketing complex roofing solutions, including the highly reconfigurable roofing of the Citroën C3 Pluriel, the sliding rear cargo roof of the GMC Envoy XUV, and the fully retractable, all-glass panoramic roof of the second generation Lincoln MKZ.

Inalfa operates production facilities in the United States, Japan, Mexico, Brazil, South-Korea, China and Poland. Its headquarters remain in Venray.

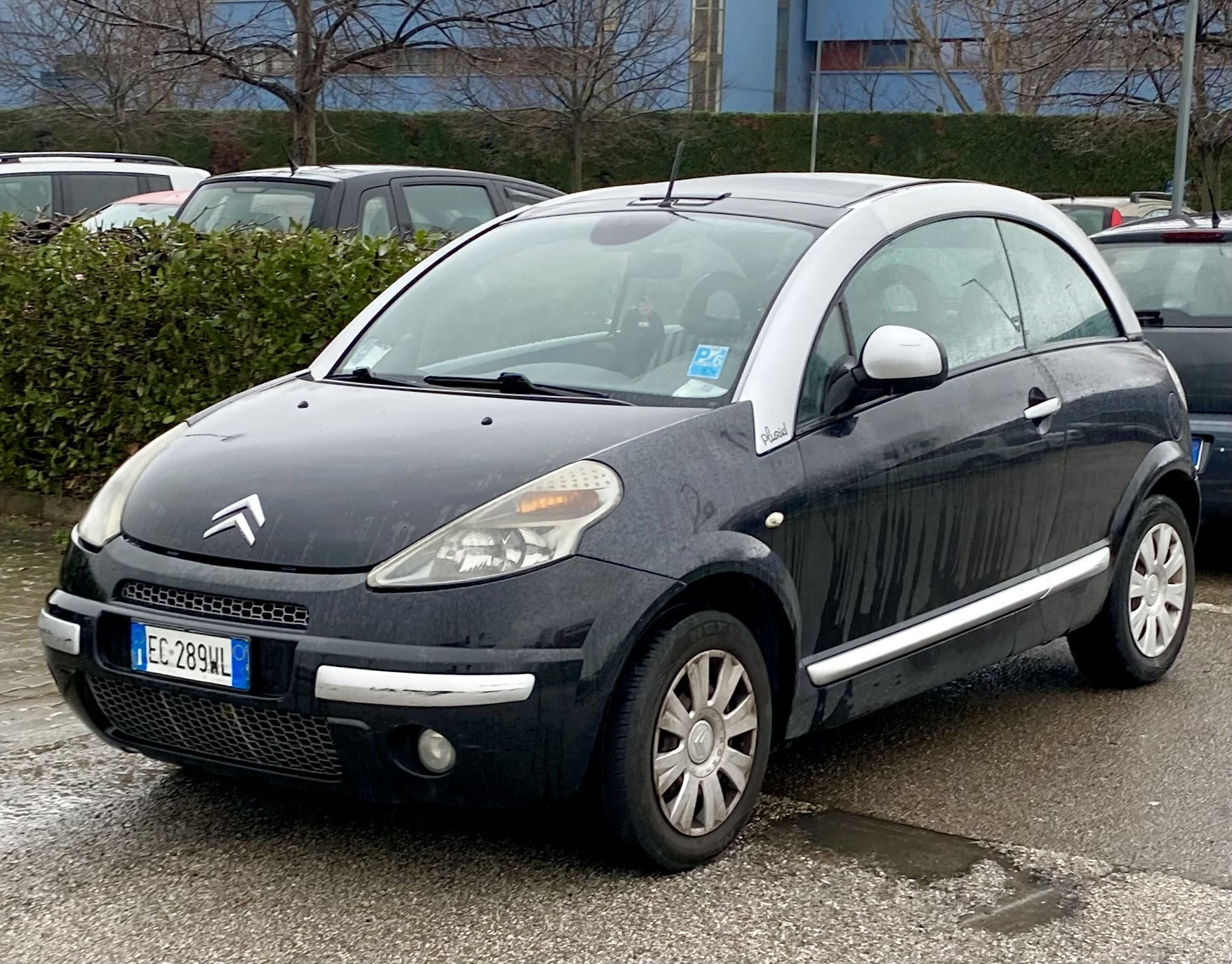
Citroën C3 Pluriel Roof Construction, developed and manufactured by Inalfa
