= Halasz =

Halasz or Halász is the Hungarian word for "fisher" as well as a Hungarian surname. Notable people with the surname include:

- Bence Halász (born 1997), Hungarian athlete hammer thrower
- Daniel Halasz II (born 1976), TV Executive living and working in Copenhagen, Denmark
- Débora Halász, Brazilian classical pianist and harpsichordist
- Gábor Halász (mathematician) (born 1941), Hungarian mathematician
- Gyula Halasz (a.k.a. Brassaï) (1899–1984), Romanian photographer, sculptor, writer, and filmmaker
- István Halász (1951–2016), Hungarian football midfielder
- János Halász or John Halas (1912–1995), Hungarian animator
- János Halász (politician) (born 1963), Hungarian politician, member of the National Assembly
- Károly Halász (1941–2016), Hungarian sculptor, and painter
- Lajos Halász, Hungarian jurist, Crown Prosecutor of Hungary in 1930
- László Halász (disambiguation)
- Máté Halász (born 1984), Hungarian handballer
- Michael Halász (born 1938), Hungarian classical conductor
- Péter Halász (actor) (1944–2006), Hungarian actor and director
- Péter Halász (conductor) (born 1976), Hungarian conductor and pianist
- Piri Halasz, American art critic and writer
- Suzette Forgues Halasz (1918–2004), Canadian cellist and music educator

== See also ==
- Halasz Gambit, a chess opening that begins with the moves: 1. e4 e5 2. d4 exd4
- Leslie Halasz Sabo or Leslie H. Sabo, Jr.
- Halas (disambiguation)
- Halászi
