= International Steel Sculpture Workshop and Symposium =

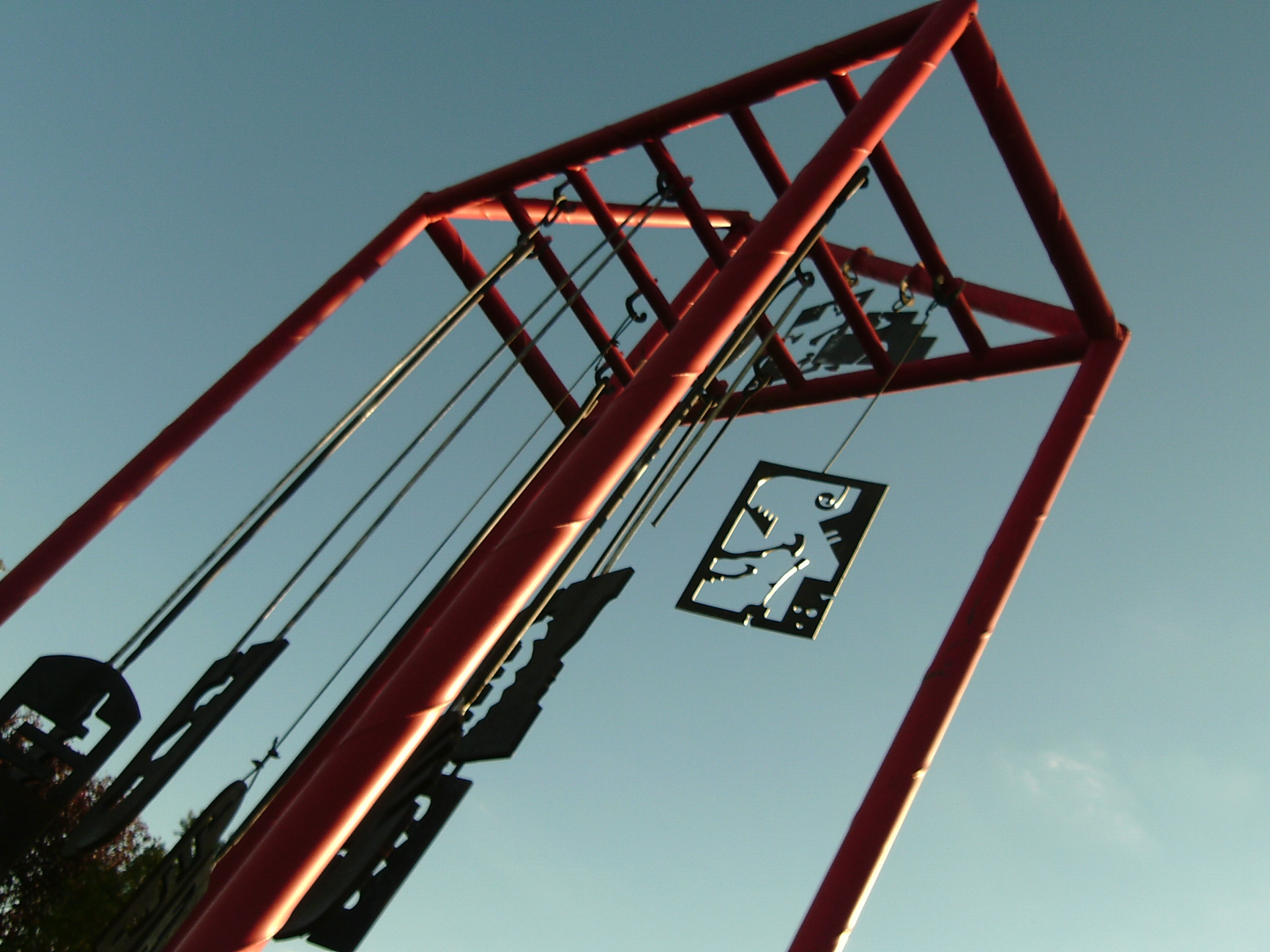
Sculptors

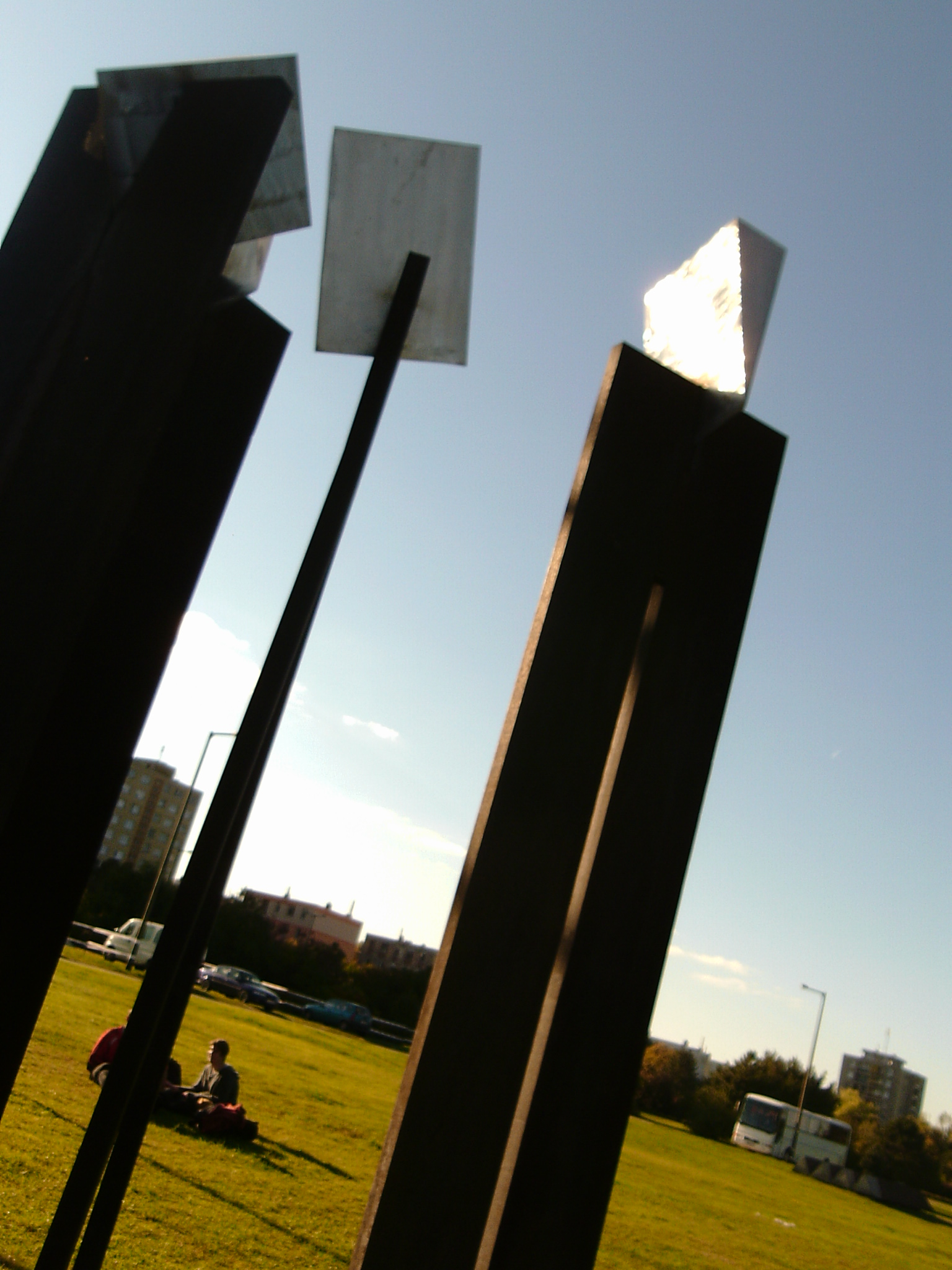
Sculptors

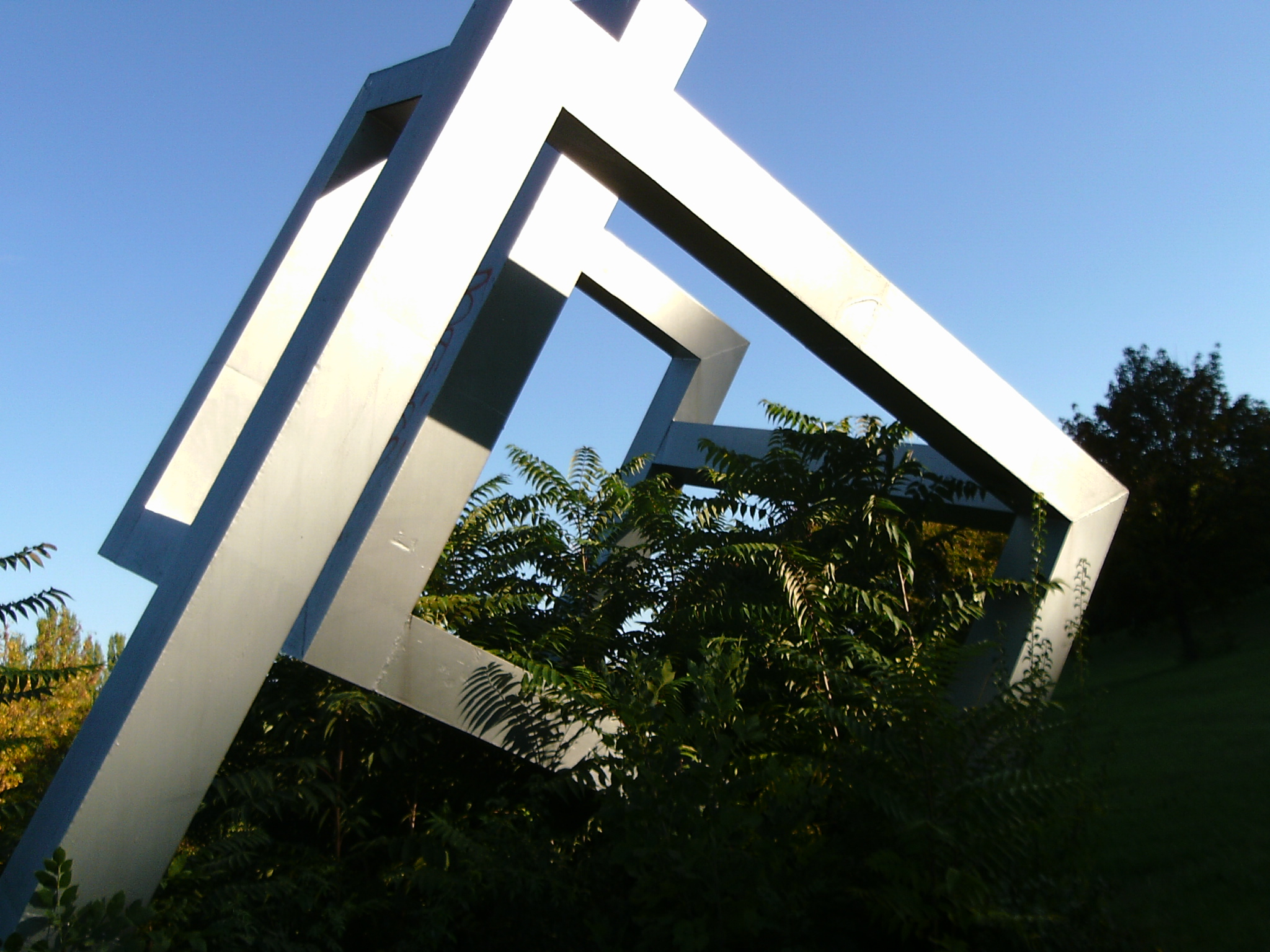
Sculptors

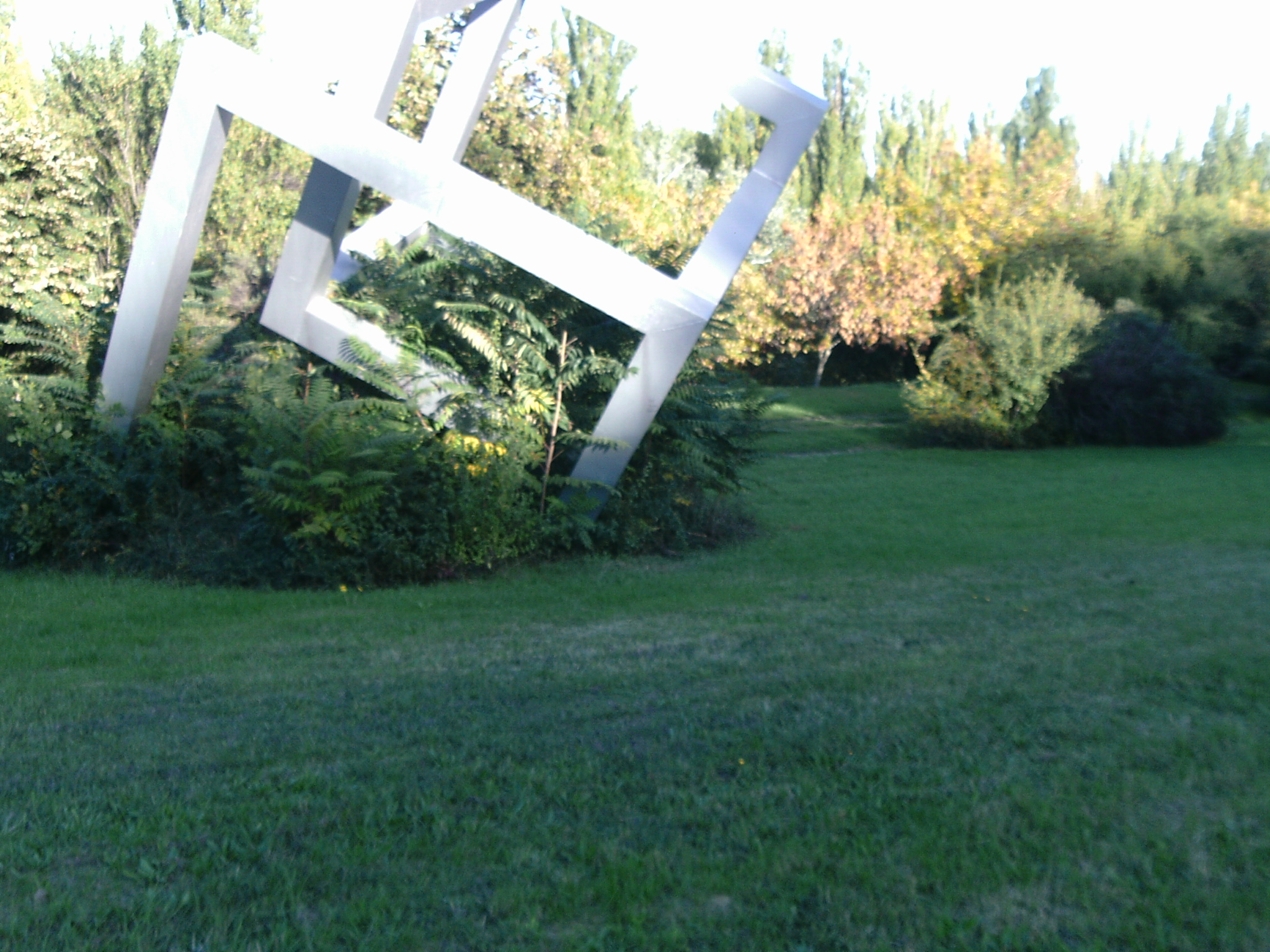
Sculptors

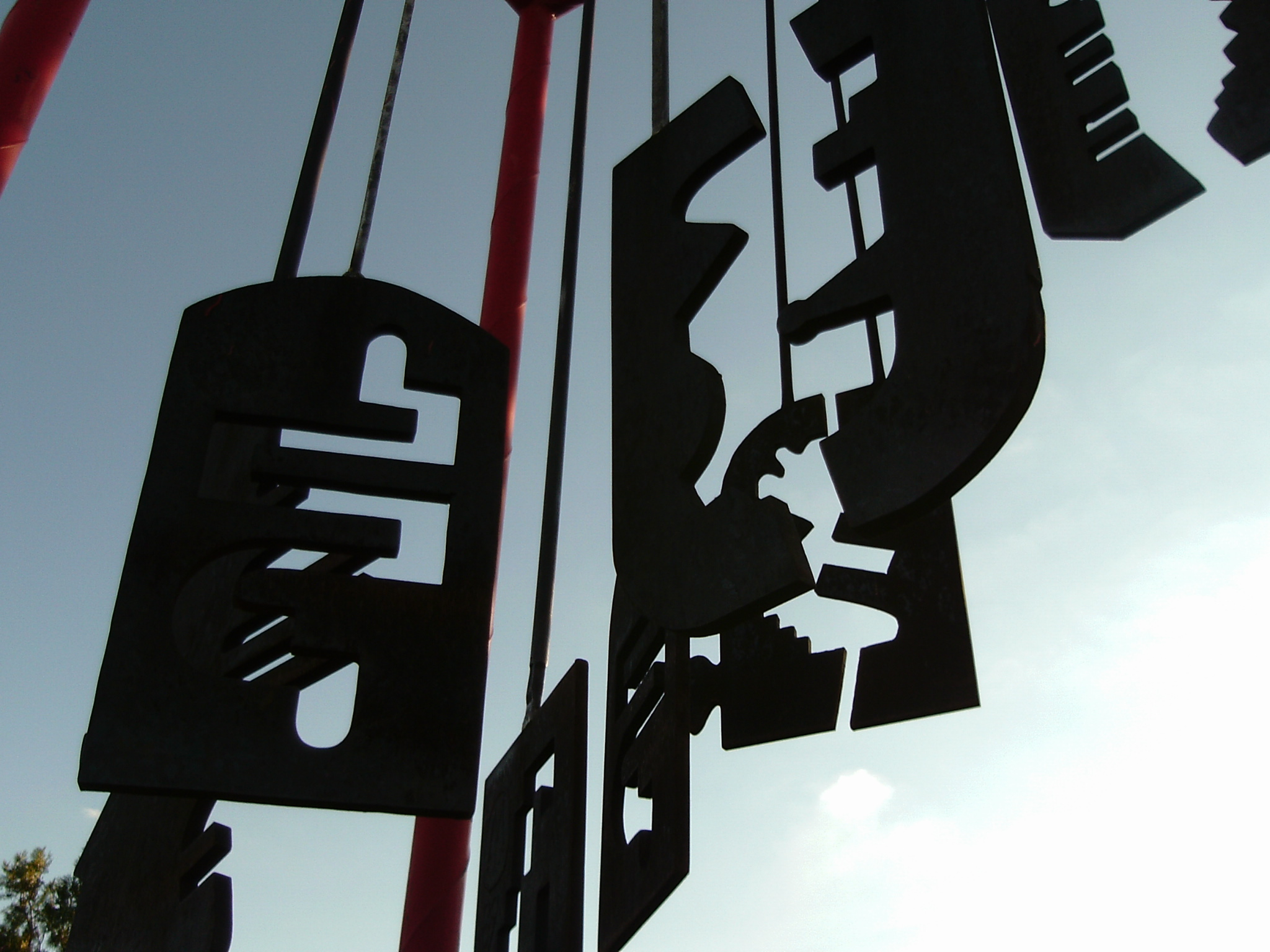
Sculptors

List of the participants of the International Steel Sculptor Workshop and Symposium in Dunaújváros'. The colony was established in 1974, which is still active in recent years in Dunaújváros. Art history brief description was published about the colony in 1987. Kunsthalle Budapest was presented the sculptor artists and their artworks between 1983 and 1985.

- Ildikó Bakos
- Zoltán Bohus
- György Buczkó
- Attila Csáji
- Róbert Csíkszentmihályi
- Sándor Fodor
- Ferenc Friedrich
- Glass, Ingo - Germany
- Gyula Gulyás
- Károly Halász
- Gábor Heritesz
- John Barlow Hudson - United States of America
- Karl, Helmut - Austria
- Klikov, Vladiszlav
- Kofteff, Vladimir - France
- Billy Lee - United States of America
- Tracy Mackenna - Scotland
- József Magyar
- Ferenc Martyn
- Rezső Móder
- Joe Moran - Ireland
- József Palotás
- Ágnes Péter
- Géza Samu
- Mihály Schéner
- József Seregi
- Seynhaeve, Paul - Belgium
- Béla Szeift
- Enikő Szöllősy
- Todor Todorov - Bulgaria
- Tamás Trombitás
- Frits Vanen - Netherlands
- Gyula Várnai
- Tibor Vilt
- Wang, Jin Sheng - United States of America
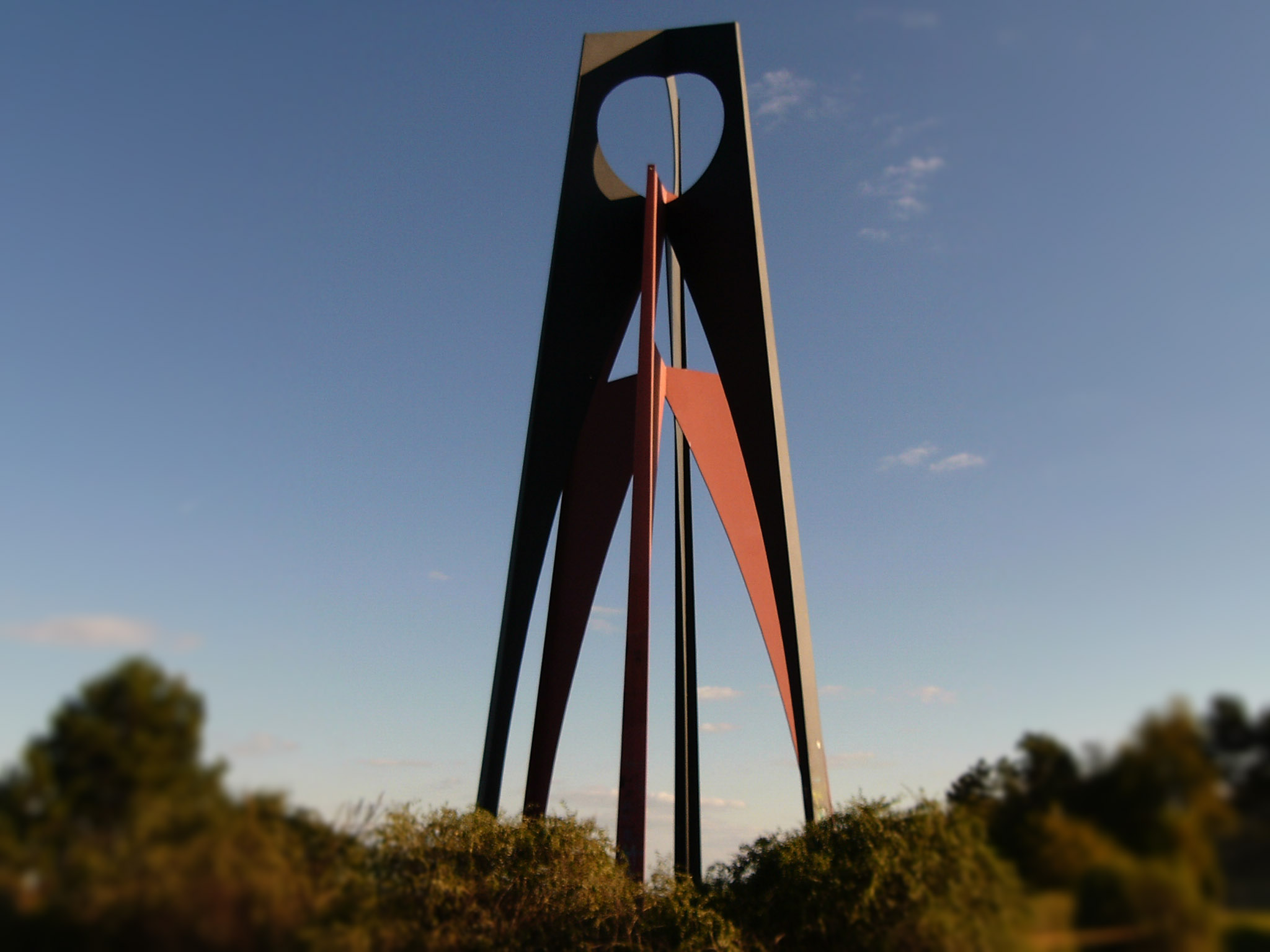

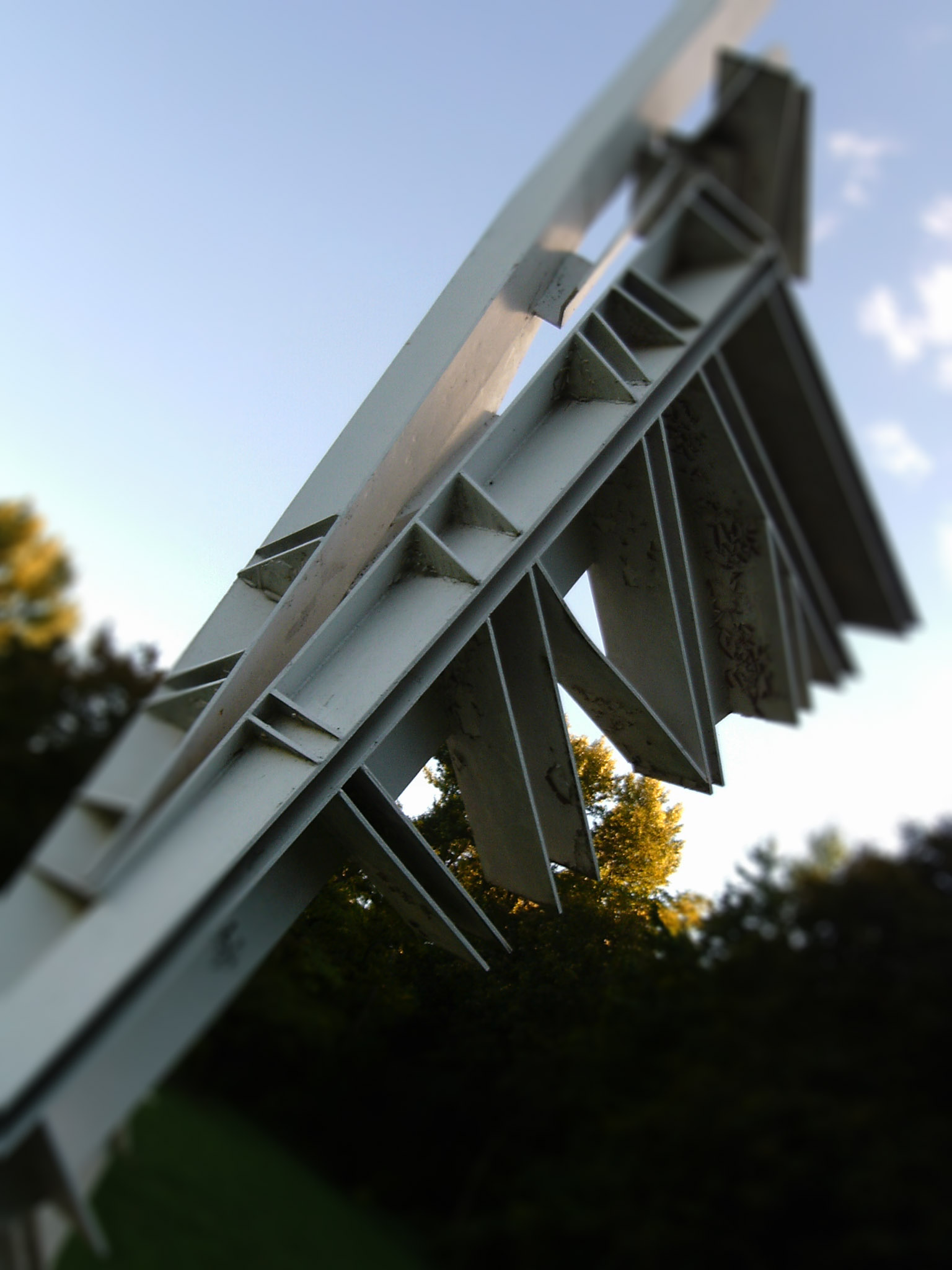

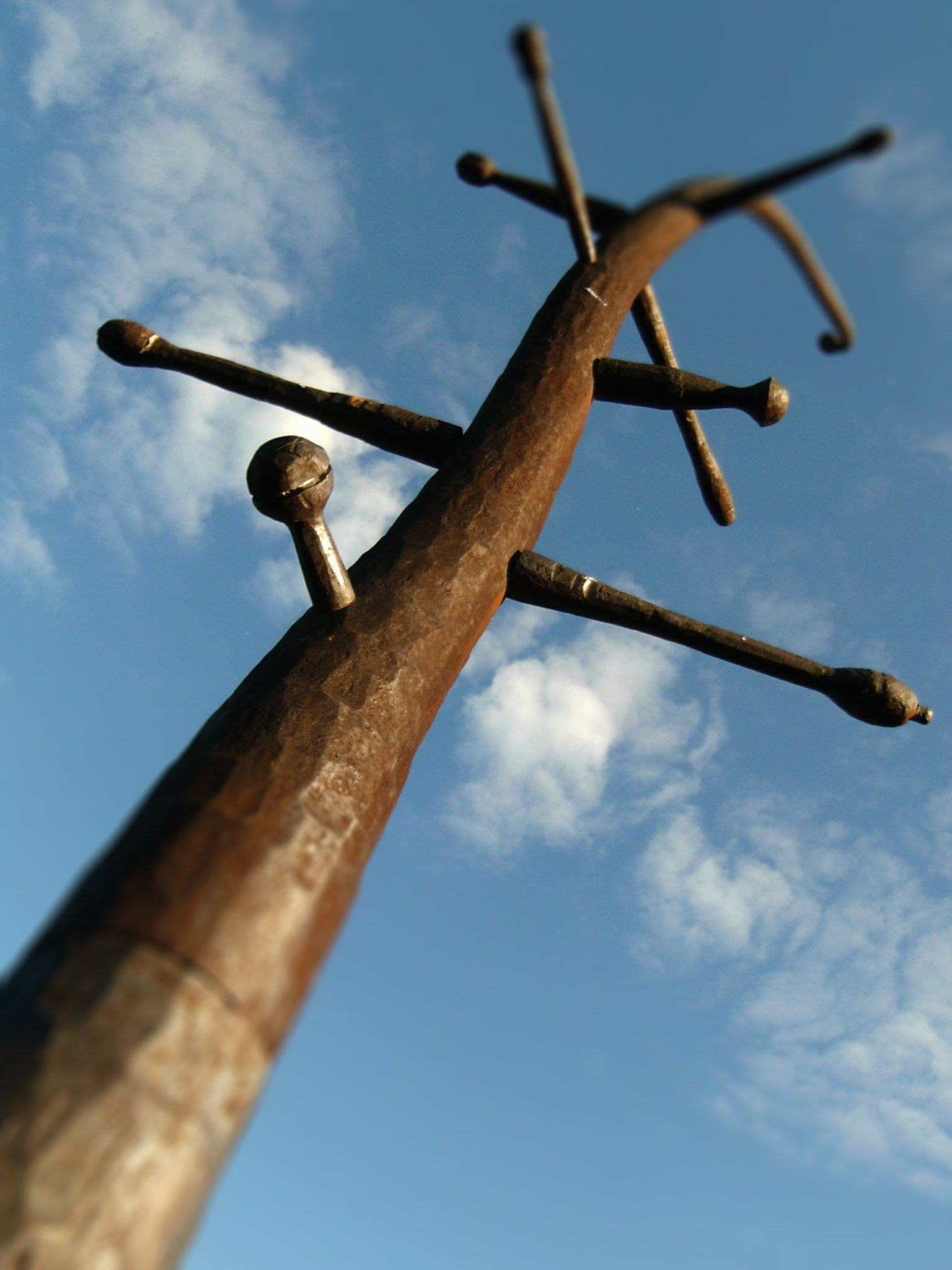

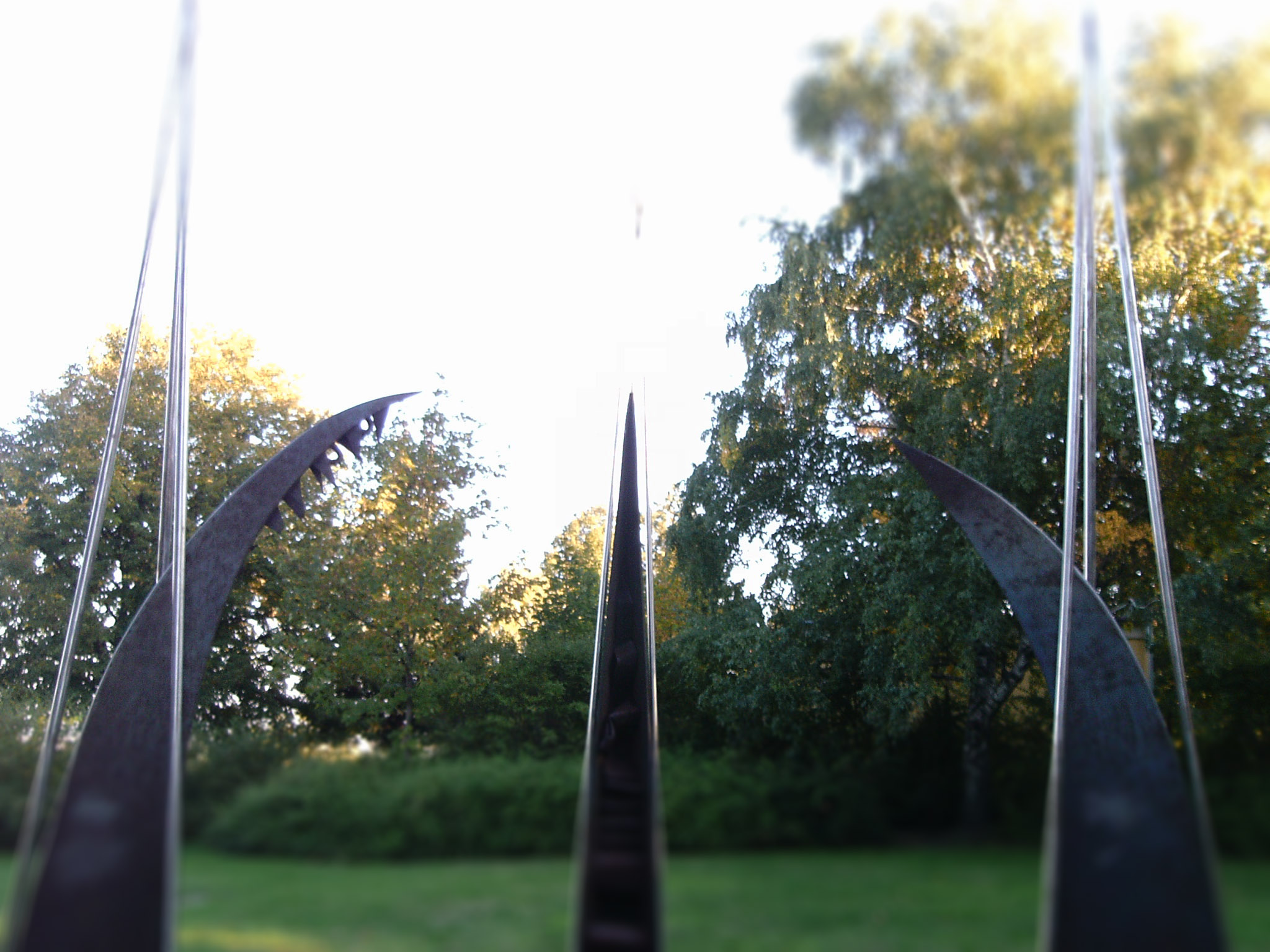

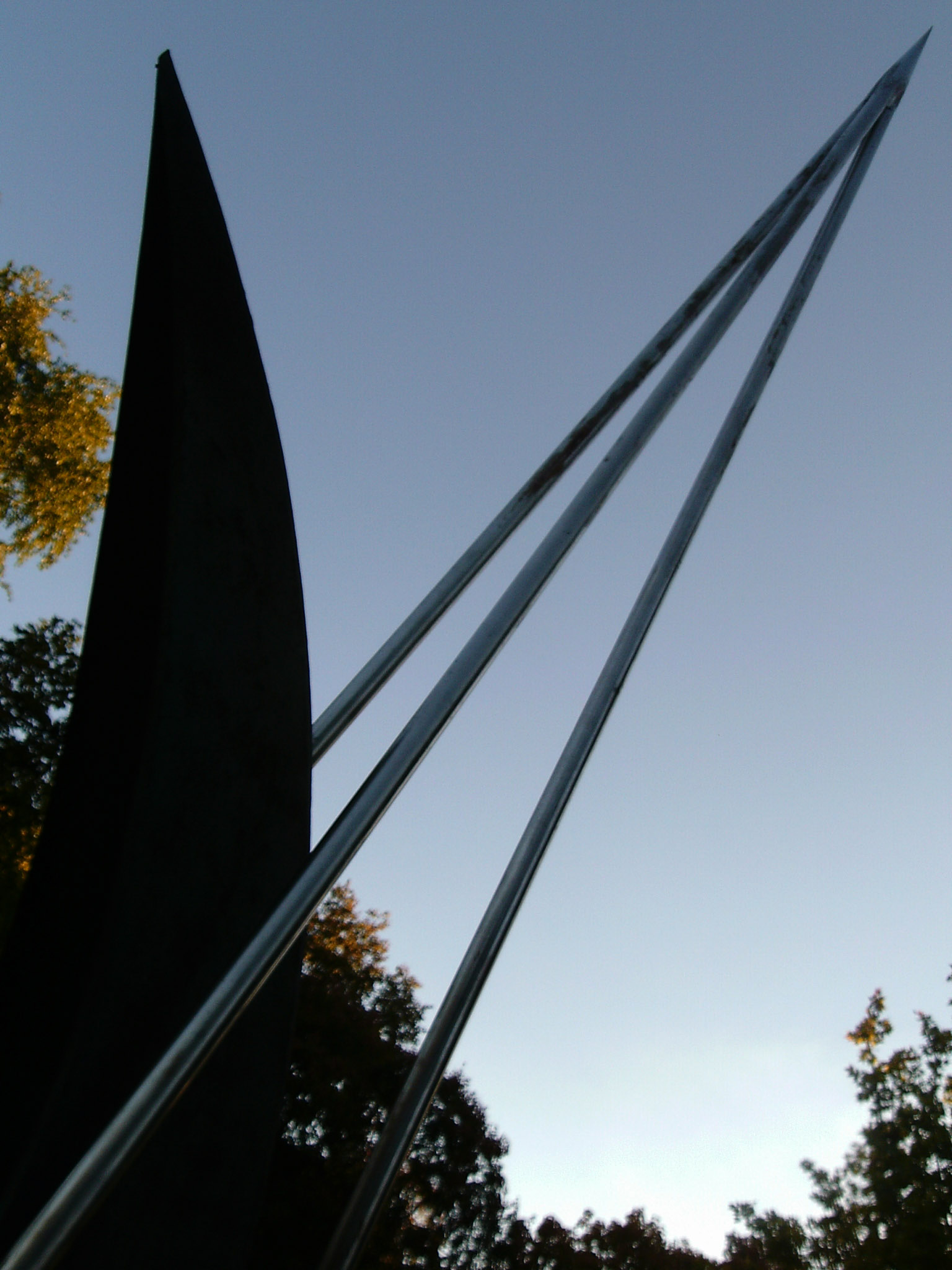
