= Moder =

Moder may refer to:

- Moder (river), a tributary of the Rhine, in France
- Moder (surname)
