= Géza Samu =

Hungarian sculptor

- Born: 2 December 1947
- Died: 6 October 1990 (aged 42)

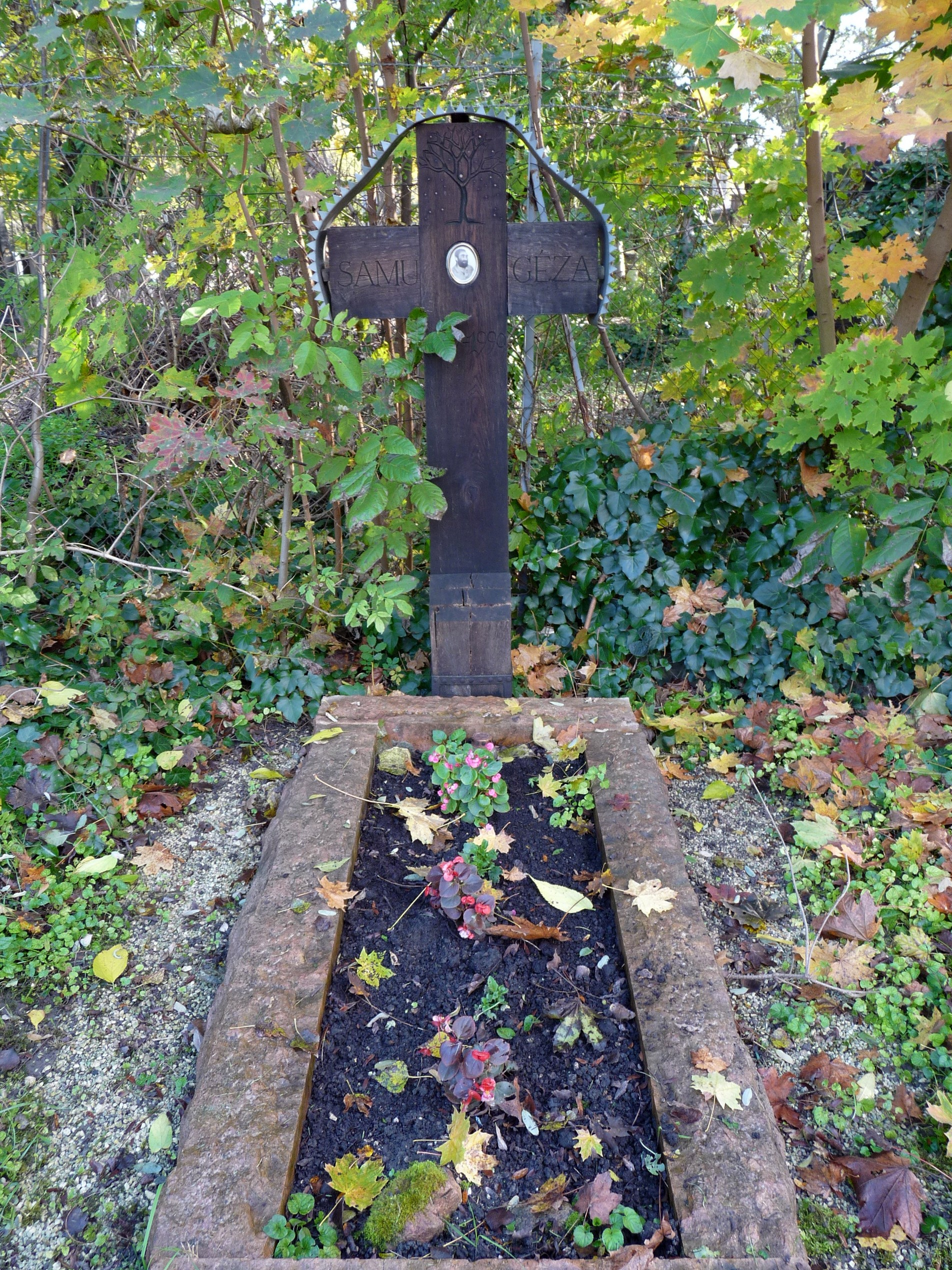
Grave of Géza Samu (1947–1990) Hungarian sculptor, in the Óbuda cemetery (49-I-60).

Géza Samu (2 December 1947 – 6 October 1990) was a Hungarian sculptor.

Géza Samu's sculpture can be visited in International Steel Sculpture Workshop and Symposium near the Danube. Sculptors of Géza Samu was in Municipal Picture Gallery, Budapest, in 1999. The Géza Samu Award was established in 2004. Name of Géza Samu is mentioned usually with József Jakovits artist, György Chesslay, Mihály Schéner. His course of life began in the 1970s. He participated in the XLIII. Venice Biennale in 1988. Géza Samu created many installations, environments and assemblages. He used wood, iron, stone, bone and vegetable seeds, bronze and alabaster also to make his sculptures. Because of his popularity the Géza Samu Museum was founded.

== Links ==
- Profile of Géza Samu artfacts.net
