= Frits Vanen =

Dutch painter and sculptor

Frits Johan Vanèn (born 7 April 1933 in Amersfoort) is a Dutch painter and sculptor.

Vanèn uses universal, geometric symbols in his artworks like squares, cubes, circles. From the elements, he visualizes water and light topics. The viewer's momentary perception finds hidden laws of nature in the artworks of Frits Vanen.

== Frits Vanen artworks ==
- 1969 5 years Dutch Sculpture, Centraal Museum Utrecht.
- 1989 International Steel Sculpture Workshop and Symposium, Dunaújváros, Hungary
- 1990 The obvious, an object of observation. Municipal Museum Roermond, Dutch Sculpt. Assoc.
- 1993 Striking Sculptures, Groeneveld /Baarn
- 1994 Space for Sculptures, Doesburg/Utrecht
- 1994 Radius of Action in Dialogue, Daelenbroek/ Herkenbosch.
- 1996 Drechtoevers Sculpture Park, Zwijndrecht
- 1996 Multiples, Beerenburght Gallery, Eck en Wiel.
- 1996 4th International Biennial of Sculptural Drawings, Vigadó Gallery, Budapest
- 1997 Small- Sculpture, Townhall and gardens of Middenbeemster.
- 1997 The Masters of Drawing and Graphic Arts, 1997 4th International Biennial, Györ Hungary.
- 1997 10th jubilee of The 4th Dimension Gallery Plasmolen

== Links ==
- Frits Vanen
