= Béla Szeift =

Hungarian sculptor, graphic artist, and painter

Béla Szeift (1944, Gödöllő – 2012) well known as a Hungarian sculptor, graphic artist, and painter.

Béla Szeift learned from János Kmetty sculpture. Béla started exhibit, when he was 22 years old. He presented his sculptors in France and many Hungarian galleries. Béla Szeift participated with his metal art sculptor in the International Steel Sculpture Workshop and Symposium in 1987. From 1969 he applicated objects to his works, he creates objects also, he effectuated the In memoriam Lajos Kassák object. Géza Bene effected to Béla Szeift's art. He represented his applications in Derkovits Club in 1969 with Árpád Szabados, Emil Parrag, András Orvos etc.

== Béla Szeift's art ==
- 1968 – Stúdió '68, Kunsthalle, Budapest
- 1978 Outdoor Sculpture Exhibition, Budapest
- 1976 Vajda LSG, Szentendre
- 1975 Stúdió '75, Ernst Museum, Budapest
- 1993–97 – I-III. National Pastel Biennial, Balassa Bálint Museum, Christian Museum, Esztergom

== Links ==
- bio of Béla Szeift
