= Munkácsy (crater) =

Crater on Mercury

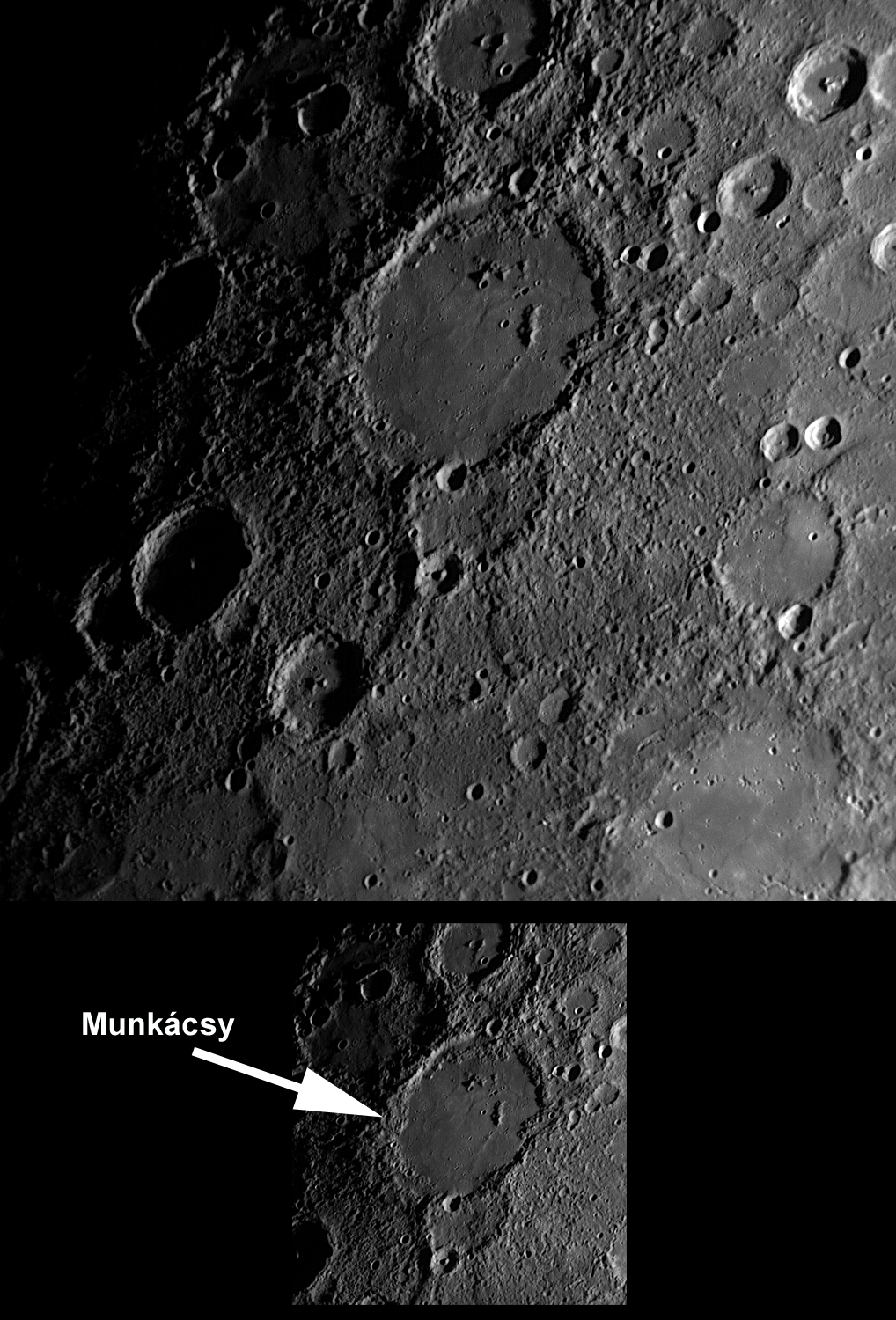
- Image from MESSENGER's first flyby in January 2008
- Feature type: Peak-ring impact basin
- Location: Raditladi quadrangle, Mercury
- Coordinates: 21.95°N 258.86°W
- Diameter: 193 km (120 mi)
- Eponym: Mihály Munkácsy

Munkácsy, named after Mihály Munkácsy, is a crater on Mercury. Munkácsy originally had a double-ring basin structure, but most of the inner ring was buried when the basin was flooded with volcanic lava. Only a few remnants of the ring poke up through the lava, although low ridges in the lava seem to trace out much of the rest of the ring's circumference. Munkácsy is one of 110 peak ring basins on Mercury.

The name of the crater was adopted by the International Astronomical Union in 2009. Munkácsy is named for the Hungarian painter Mihály Munkácsy.

The crater Fonteyn is to the northwest of Munkácsy, and the crater Raditladi is to the northeast. Guinness crater is to the southwest.

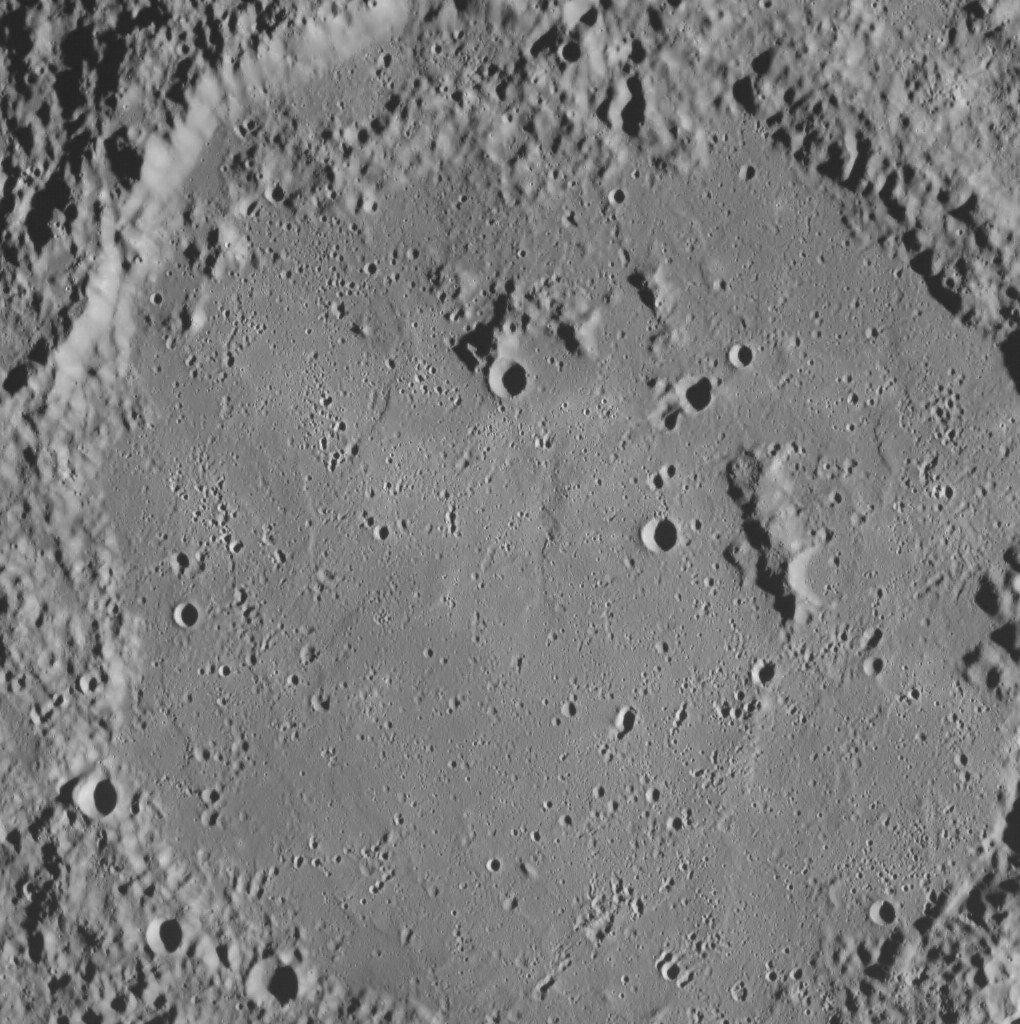
Most of the crater

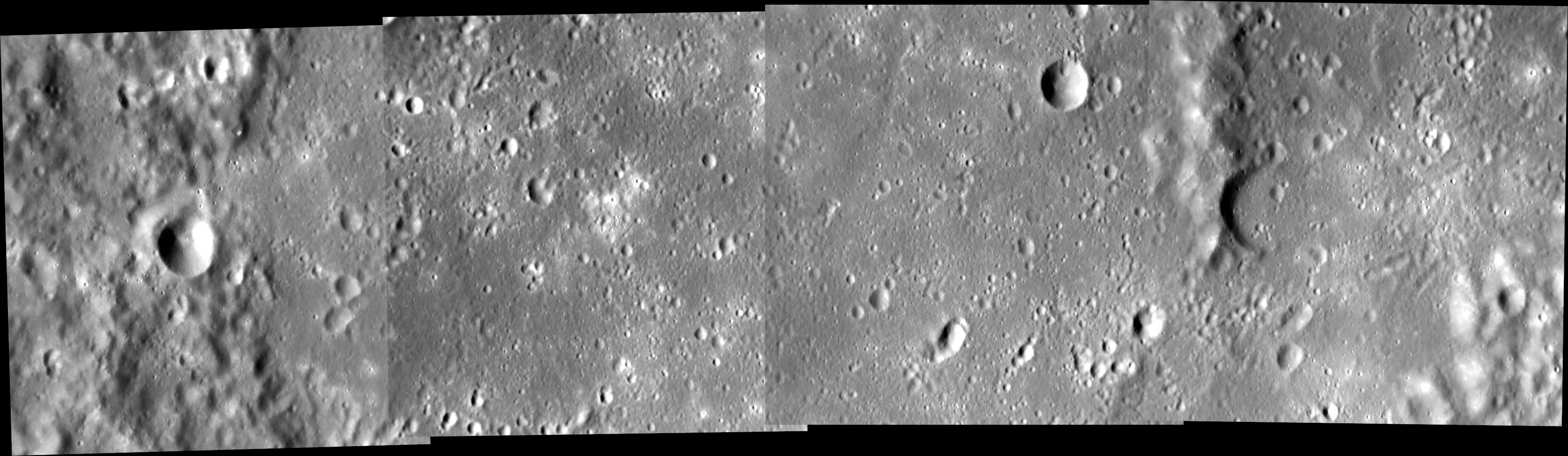
Mosaic across the central crater
