= Guinness (crater) =

Crater on Mercury

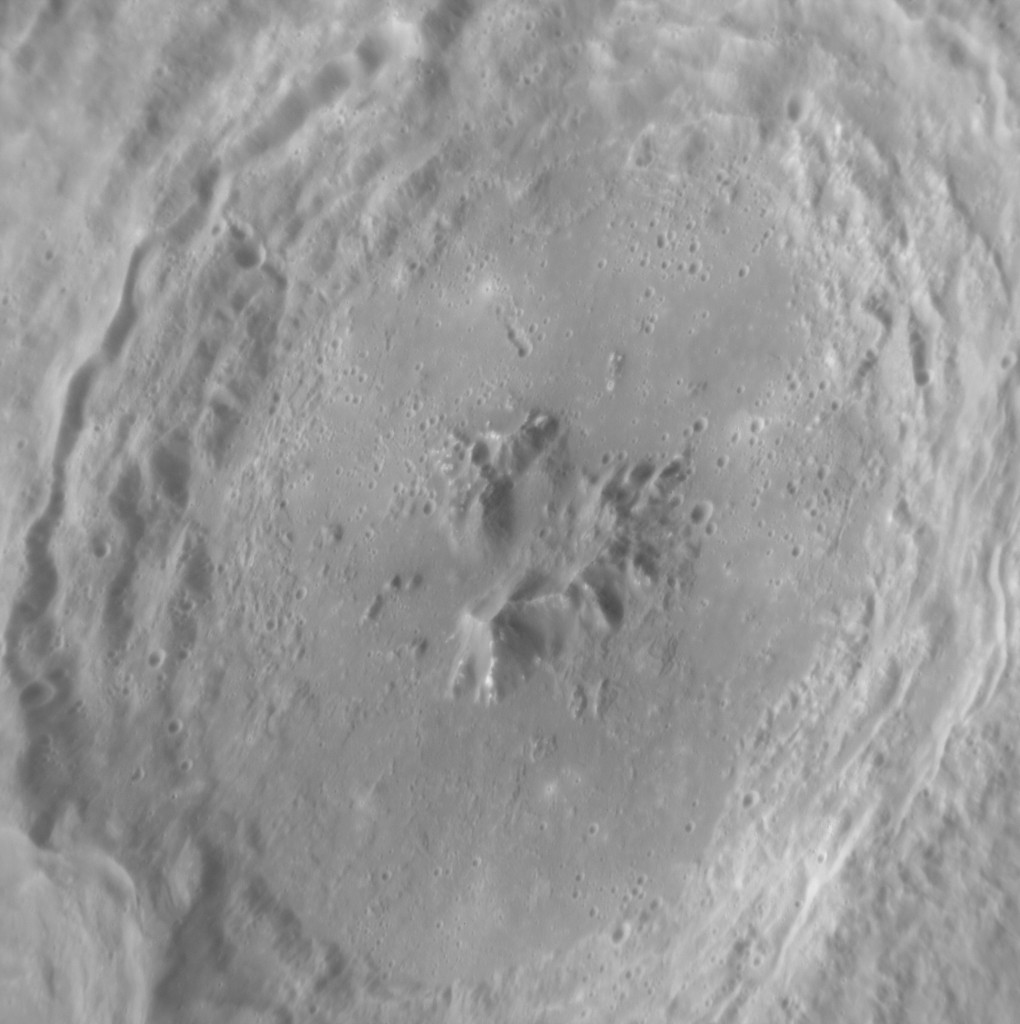
- MESSENGER NAC
- Planet: Mercury
- Coordinates: 15.79°N 266.28°W
- Quadrangle: Eminescu
- Diameter: 97.0 km (60.3 mi)
- Eponym: May Guinness

Guinness is a crater on Mercury. Its name was adopted by the International Astronomical Union (IAU) on February 7, 2025. The crater is named for Irish painter May Guinness.

The central peak complex of Guinness is a dark spot associated with hollows.

Guinness is to the southwest of the crater Munkácsy.

== Views ==
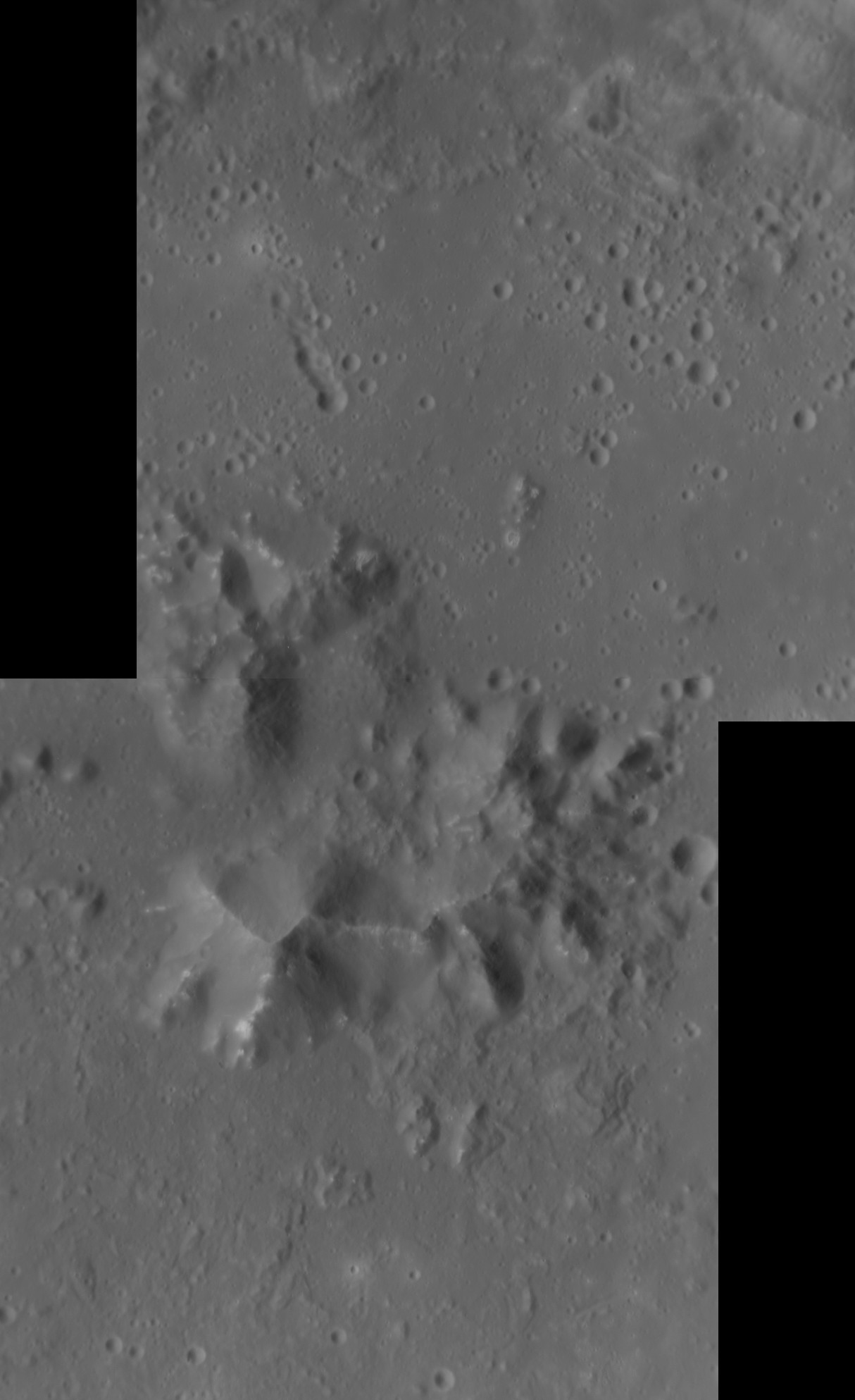
Detail of central peak

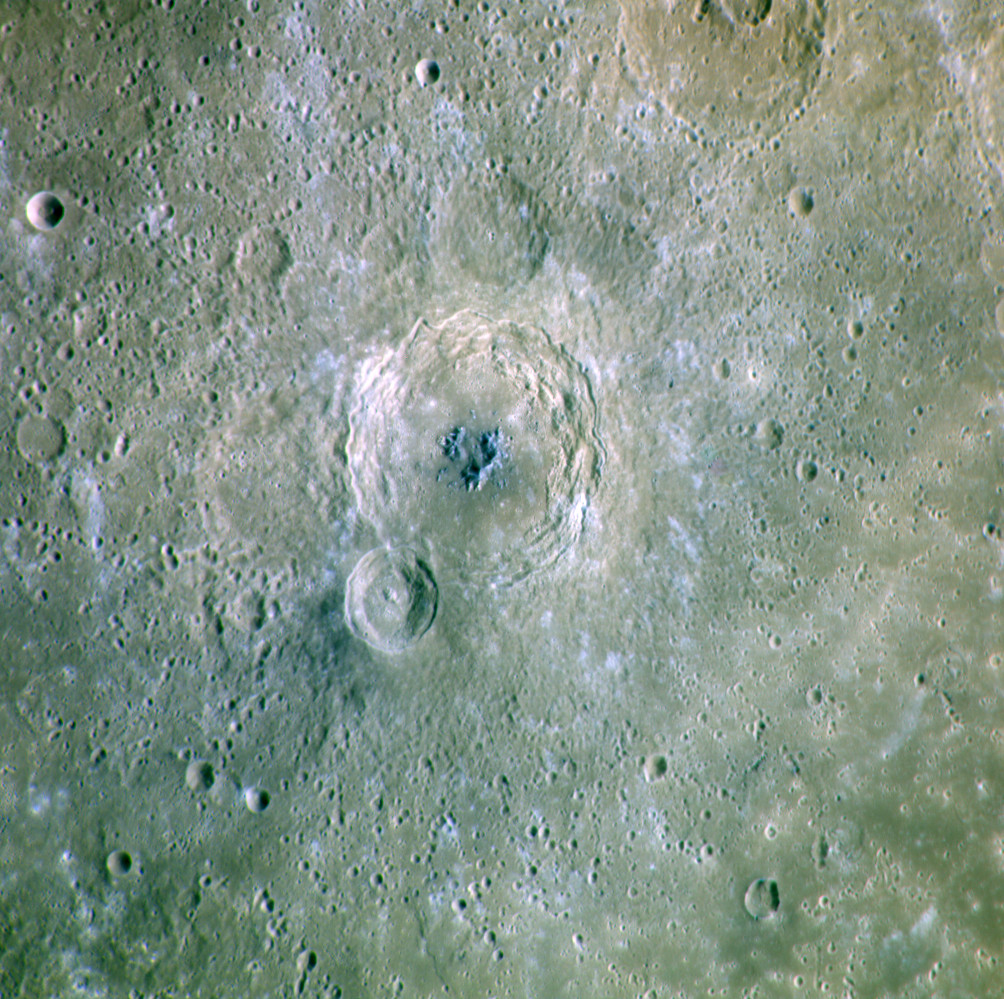
Exaggerated color view
