= Moder (surname) =

Moder is a surname. Notable people with the surname include:

- Daniel Moder (born 1969), American cinematographer
- Jakub Moder (born 1999), Polish footballer
- Jozef Móder (born 1947), Slovak footballer
- Ladislav Móder (1945–2006), Slovak footballer
- Mary Moder (1905–1993), American voice actress
- Matthias Moder (born 1963), East German hammer thrower
- Paul Moder (1896–1942), German Nazi politician and military officer
- Paul Moder (actor), Australian actor
- Rezső Móder (born 1954), Hungarian artist
