= Vladimir Kopteff =

American sculptor

Vladimir Kopteff (Viipuri, 1932 – Helsinki, 2007) was a Finnish sculptor.

== Vladimir Kopteff art presentations ==
- 1969 – Strindberg Gallery Helsinki
- 1970 – TM Gallery Helsinki
- 1971 – The Gallery of the Artist's Association of Helsinki
- 1972 – Gallery Artek Helsinki
- 1974 – International Steel Sculpture Workshop and Symposium
- 1975 – Kluuvin galleria Helsinki, Museum Eger, Hungary
- 1977 – Gallery Vecu Antwerp, Belgium
- 1978 – Gallery Margaretha de Boeve, Assenede Belgium
- 1980 – Taidegraafikot Galleria Helsinki
- 1981 – KOP Olunkylä Helsinki
- 1982 – Artlisa Galleria Pori
- 1983 – Ässä Galleria Helsinki
- 1985 – Galleria Tavastia Hämeenlinna
- 1986 – Kluuvin Galleria Helsinki
- 1987 – International Steel Sculpture Workshop and Symposium, Dunaújváros, Unkari
- 1989 – The Nationale School of Fine Arts, Brussel, Belgium
- 1993 – International Steel Sculpture Workshop and Symposium
