= Gábor Heritesz =

Gábor Heritesz is a Hungarian sculptor. He won the 1998 Munkácsy Mihály Award.

== Early life ==
He was born in Budapest in 1948,

Heritesz was taught sculpture by Laborcz Ferenc. He won the prize of the Institute of Public Education in 1977, having spent time studying sculpture on a tour in Bulgaria and Germany.

He became a constructivist sculptor, expressing his art through geometric form. Heritesz participated in the 1987 International Steel Sculpture Workshop and Symposium.

Minimalism characterized his style, and he used many different types of materials such as precious wood, polished steel, brazen, and iron. Heritesz created new sculptures in Győr Sculptor Workshop and in Tokai Sculptor Workshop.

== Works ==
=== Group exhibitions ===
- 2012 KOGART, Budapest
- 2011 Contemporary Sculptures of the KOGART Contemporary Art Collection, Dom Umenia, Bratislava
- 1986 III. International Bienniale of statuette, Schwabenlandhalle, Fellbach
- 1983 Results artistic symposiums, I., statuary, Műcsarnok, Budapest – Gallery of Józsefvárosi, Budapest – Hungarian medal, London

=== Works in collections ===
- Cavellini, Marialaura Marazzi Brescia
- Communa de Villasimius, Cagliari
- Franco Dagani, Brescia
- Gaudens Pedit, Lienz
- Giuseppe Baldini, Bologna
- Neue Galerie am Landesmuseum Joanneum, Graz
- Roland Riz, Bolzano

=== Public sculptures ===
- Metalplastic (1987, Dunaújváros, outdoor sculpture park)
- II. World War monument (limestone, black granite, 1991, Iregszemcse, Kossuth Square)
- Naturalness (wood, 1993, Nagyatád, sculpture park)

== Links ==
- biography of Gábor Heritesz
