= Fonteyn (crater) =

Crater on Mercury

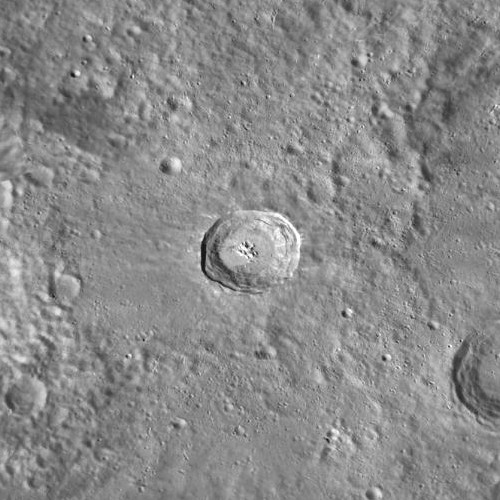
- MESSENGER WAC mosaic of Fonteyn
- Feature type: Central-peak impact crater
- Location: Raditladi quadrangle, Mercury
- Coordinates: 32.82°N 264.49°W
- Diameter: 29 km (18 mi)
- Eponym: Margot Fonteyn

Fonteyn is a crater on Mercury. Its name was adopted by the IAU in 2012, after the English ballet dancer Margot Fonteyn.

The crater Munkácsy is to the southeast of Fonteyn.

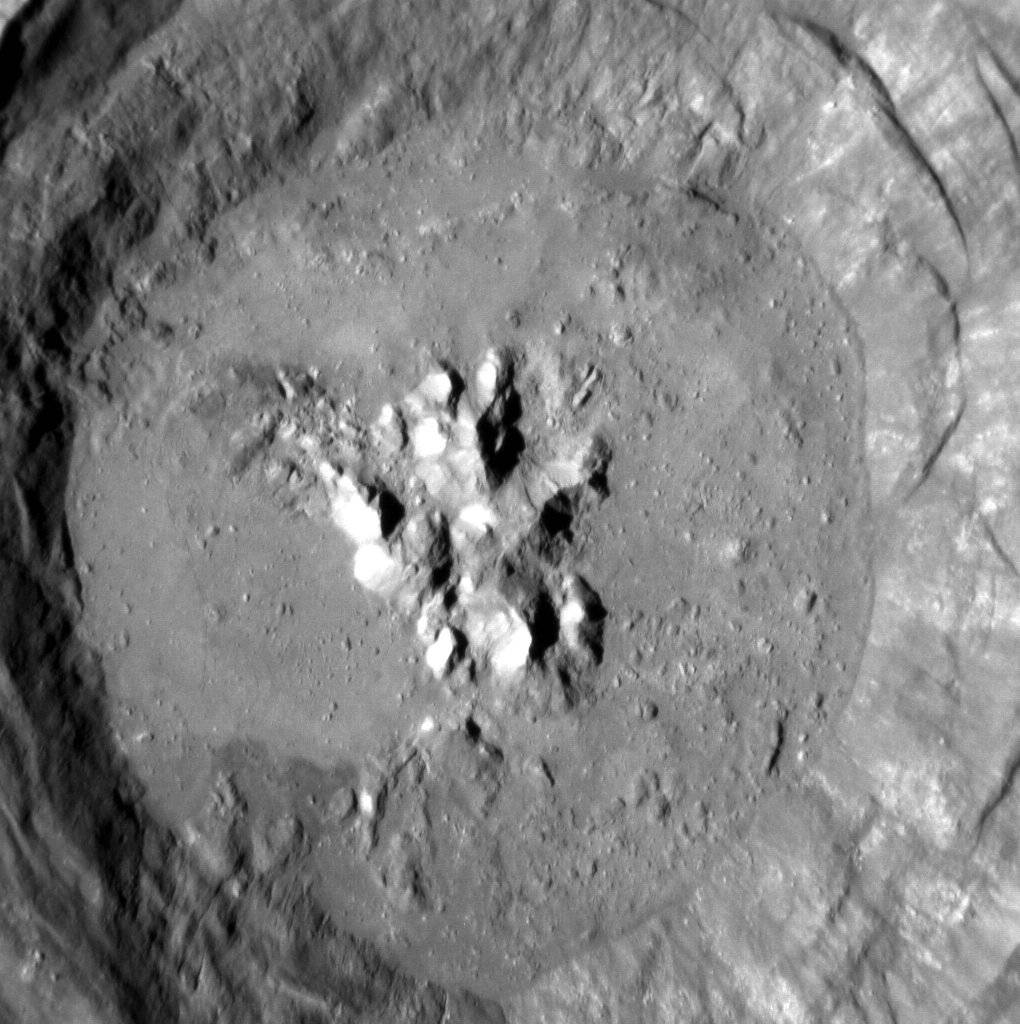
Fonteyn crater interior, showing detail of the central peak complex and texture of the impact melt on the crater floor.
