= Sándor Fodor =

Hungarian sculptor

- Born: 1954 (age 71–72); Dunaújváros, Hungary
- Known for: Sculptor
- Notable work: Dózsa
- Style: Figurative

Sándor Fodor (Dunaújváros, Hungary, 1954) well known as a Hungarian sculptor.

József Somogyi, famous Hungarian sculptor, taught Sándor Fodor. Sándor Fodor went to Italy field trip during his education years from 1967 to 1977. Sándor Fodor participated with his metal art sculptor in the International Steel Sculpture Workshop and Symposium in 1987. Sándor Fodor just as József Somogyi creates figurative sculptors usually with nobel bronze metal. His Dózsa public art sculptor can be found in the Hungarian city Hatvan.

== Links ==
- Sándor Fodor
