= Pál Böhm =

Hungarian painter (1839–1905)

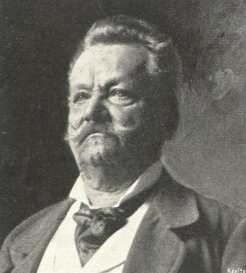
- Pál Böhm
- Born: December 28, 1839; Nagyvárad, Hungary
- Died: March 29, 1905 (aged 65); Munich, Germany
- Known for: Painter
- Movement: Orientalist

Pál (Paul) Böhm (28 December 1839, Nagyvárad - 29 March 1905, Munich) was a Hungarian genre painter.

== Life and work ==
He first studied drawing with his father, who was a maintenance engineer at the bishop's manor. After finishing elementary school, he tried his hand at many crafts, including carpentry, coppersmithing and toy making. In 1859, he joined a group of scenery painters and learned that craft from Antal Haan. In 1862, he finally decided to become a painter, eventually travelling to Vienna, where he copied the works on display in the Belvedere Palace. In 1865, he returned to his hometown and attempted to make a living by painting portraits and altarpieces. He also briefly operated a painting school that was attended by László Paál.

Two years later, he was sufficiently established to earn a decent living and moved to Budapest, where he exhibited with the National Society of Hungarian Fine Arts. In 1871, he received a scholarship from Tivadar Pauler, the Minister of Religion and Education. This enabled him to travel to Munich, where he quickly became part of the city's artistic life and associated with a group of Hungarian painters led by Géza Mészöly. On several occasions, he stayed in the Tisza region, where he painted and sketched, but settled in Munich permanently in 1875. After this point, his paintings lost some of their freshness and are generally considered by critics to be rather commercial.

== Selected paintings ==
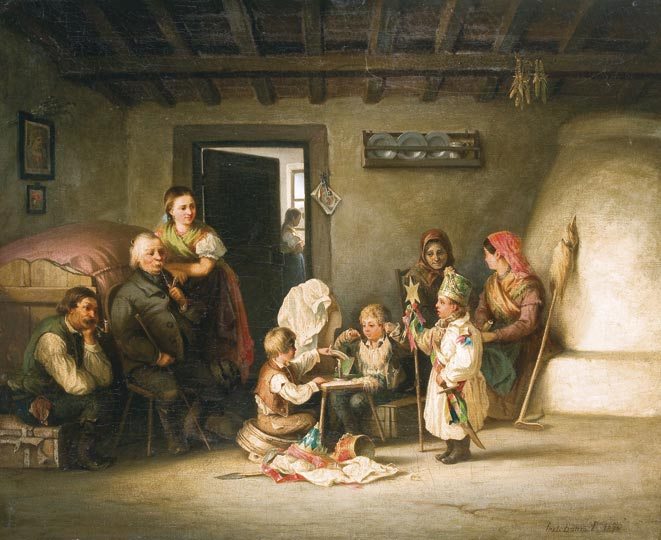
Preparing for the Nativity (1870)

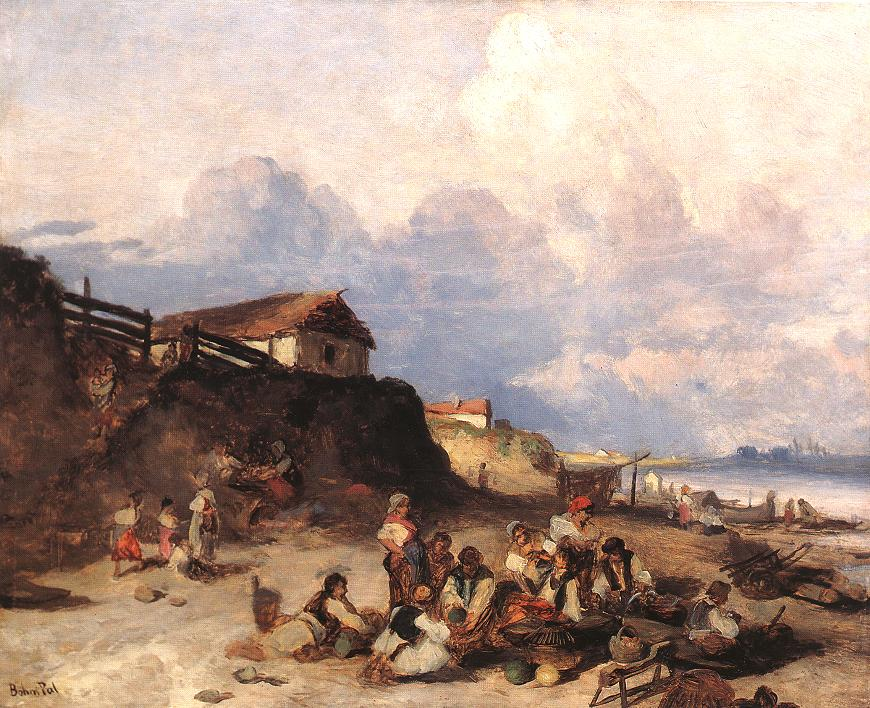
Scene on the Banks
of the Tisza River (1873)

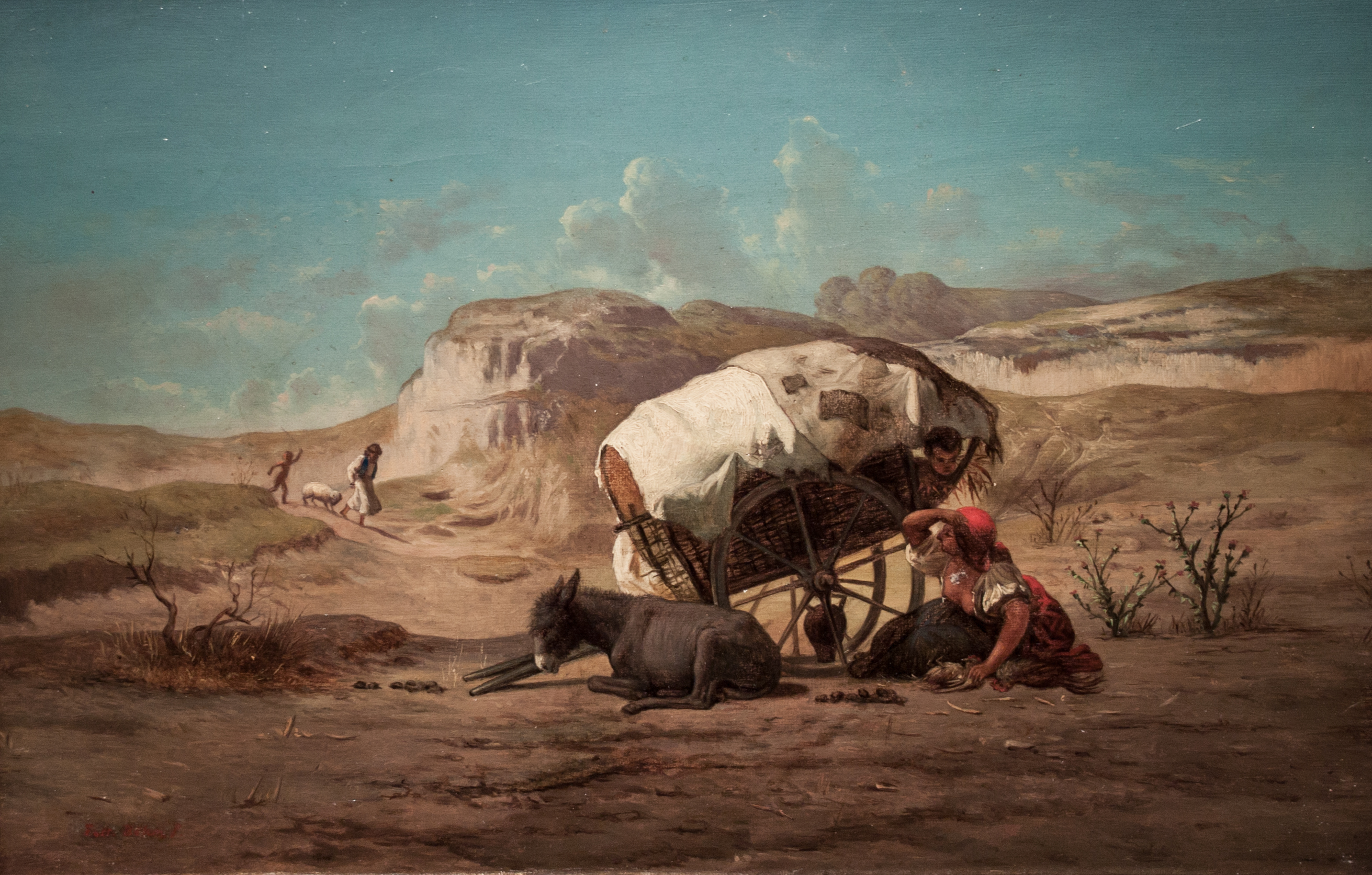
The Tumbrel
(date unknown)

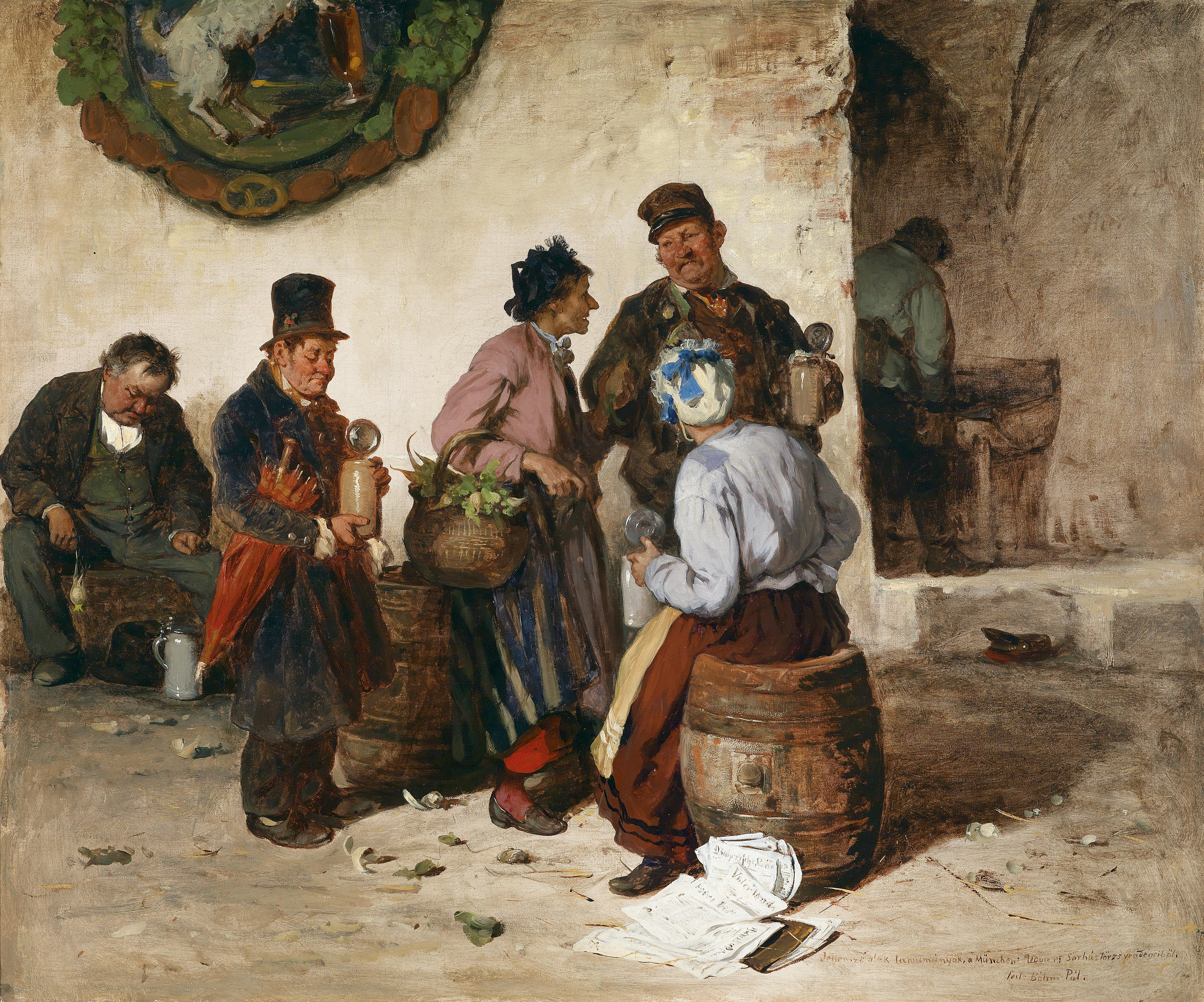
At a Brewery in Munich
(date unknown)
