= László Paál =

Hungarian Impressionist landscape painter

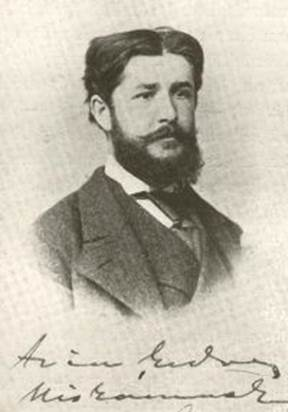
László Paál (1873)

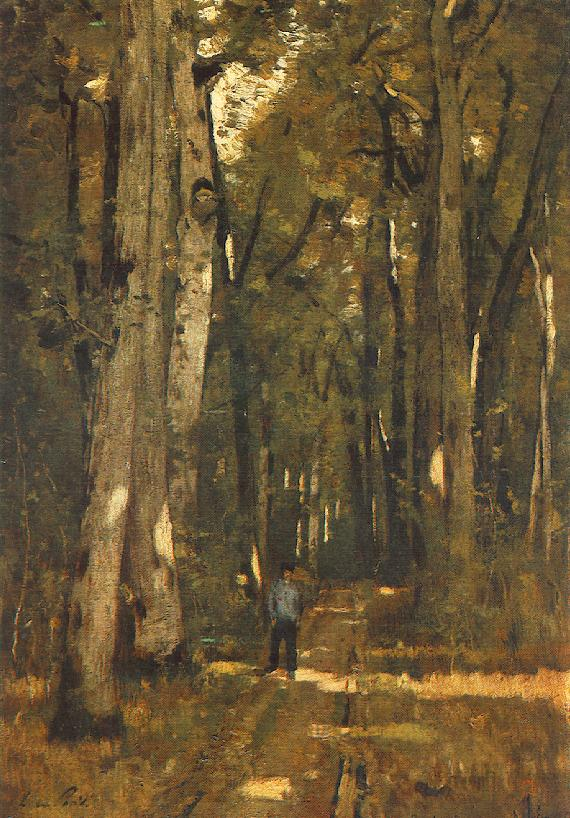
Path in the Forest of Fontainebleau (1876)

László Paál (30 July 1846, Zám, Transylvania, Austrian Empire - 4 March 1879, Charenton-le-Pont, France) was a Hungarian Impressionist landscape painter.

== Life ==
He was descended from a noble family and his father was a postmaster, which resulted in frequent moves for the family. He displayed an early talent for art and his first lessons came from Pál Böhm in Arad. Upon his father's request, he went to Vienna in 1864 to study law, but began preparatory studies at the Academy of Fine Arts and became a student of Albert Zimmermann in 1866. Three years later, he participated in a major exhibition in Munich, where he first came into contact with painters of the Barbizon school.

In 1870, he and Eugen Jettel took a study trip to the Netherlands and, later that same year, he entered the Kunstakademie Düsseldorf on the recommendation of his boyhood friend, Mihály Munkácsy. This was followed by an invitation to London, made by a major art dealer there, and his discovery of the works of John Constable.

After 1873, he married and lived at the Barbizon art colony, was a regular participant in the Salon and won a medal at the Exposition Universelle (1878). By this time, his health had noticeably deteriorated (possibly from tuberculosis) and he suffered an accident at home, which resulted in a serious brain injury. He was placed in a nursing home, but never recovered, dying in the spring of 1879 at the age of 33.
