= József Seregi =

Hungarian sculptor and ceramist

József Seregi (born December 10, 1939, in Budaörs) is a Hungarian sculptor and ceramist.

József was a participant of artist colonies at Prilep, Hoyerswerda, Dunaújváros, Burgas and Lindabrunn. József joined the DunapArt Artist Association in 1987. He creates large public sculptures and small statuettes. He uses various type of materials, emphasizing stone, bronze and ceramics. József's sculpture can be visited in International Steel Sculpture Workshop and Symposium near the Danube. He exhibited in Bicske (1978), Regensburg (1989), Grevenbroich (1993). Some works are in public collections, such as Déri Museum and Hungarian National Gallery. His most notable figurative sculptures are Positive and negative forms (New Danube City), Seated Woman (Hoyerswerda), and John Lippa Monument (limestone, bronze, Budapest).
