= László Halász =

László Halász may refer to:

- László Halász (cyclist)
- László Halász (rower)
- Laszlo Halasz (conductor)
