= Tracy Mackenna =

British sculptor (born 1963)

Tracy Mackenna (born 1963) is a British sculptor and artist. She was Course Director at Duncan of Jordanstone College of Art and Design.

== Education ==
Tracy Mackenna studied at the Glasgow School of Art between 1981 and 1986. She is a Royal Scottish Academy's Academician.

== Career ==
In 1986 and 1987, Mackenna worked and lived in Hungary. Exhibitions of her works were held in Hungary, France, Ireland and Scotland during that time period.

Returning to Glasgow, Mackenna was a founding director of Glasgow Sculpture Studios in 1988. She produced If Crocodiles flew on wings.... as an artist in residence at the Glasgow Garden Festival. She has lectured at Gray's School of Art in Aberdeen. Mackenna has been a Course Director for the Master of Fine Arts program at Duncan of Jordanstone College of Art and Design.

Mackenna and Edwin Janssen created multidisciplinary works for exhibition with themes such as cultural identity, concepts of place, and life and death.

The artist Tracy Mackenna, working lately with the Dutch-born Edwin Janssen, has developed accessible participatory methods and displays varied interest in Scottish nationhood, as a visual distillation of the debates surrounding the Scottish people's notions of Scottishness.

— Craig Richardson

Her affiliations include Board of the Scottish Sculpture Workshop, Faculty of Fine Arts at The British School at Rome, Steering Group Pépinières Européennes pour Jeunes Artistes and The Scottish Arts Council's Reference Group for National Policy for Public Art and Visual Arts Awards Panel.

== Works ==
A partial list of works of Tracy Mackenna and Edwin Janssen:

- Ed and Ellis in Schiedam (1998)
- The Netherlands, (2012)
- The Poem Pedlar (2012)
- War as Ever (2012)
- Seeing is Believing (Onomatopee, Eindhoven)
- Truth, Error, Opinion
- Shotgun Wedding
- A Perfect Image of Ourselves

== Galleries and museums ==
Her works have been shown in:

- Cooper Gallery, Huntington, New York
- Collective Gallery, London, 1986
- Graeme Murray Gallery, Edinburgh, 1988
- Duna Gallery, Budapest, 1988
- Migros Museum für Gegenwartskunst, Zürich
- Scottish National Portrait Gallery, Edinburgh
- Museum of Contemporary Art Tokyo
- Ikon Gallery, Birmingham
- Centre for Contemporary Arts, Glasgow
