= Mihály Munkácsy =

Hungarian painter (1844-1900)

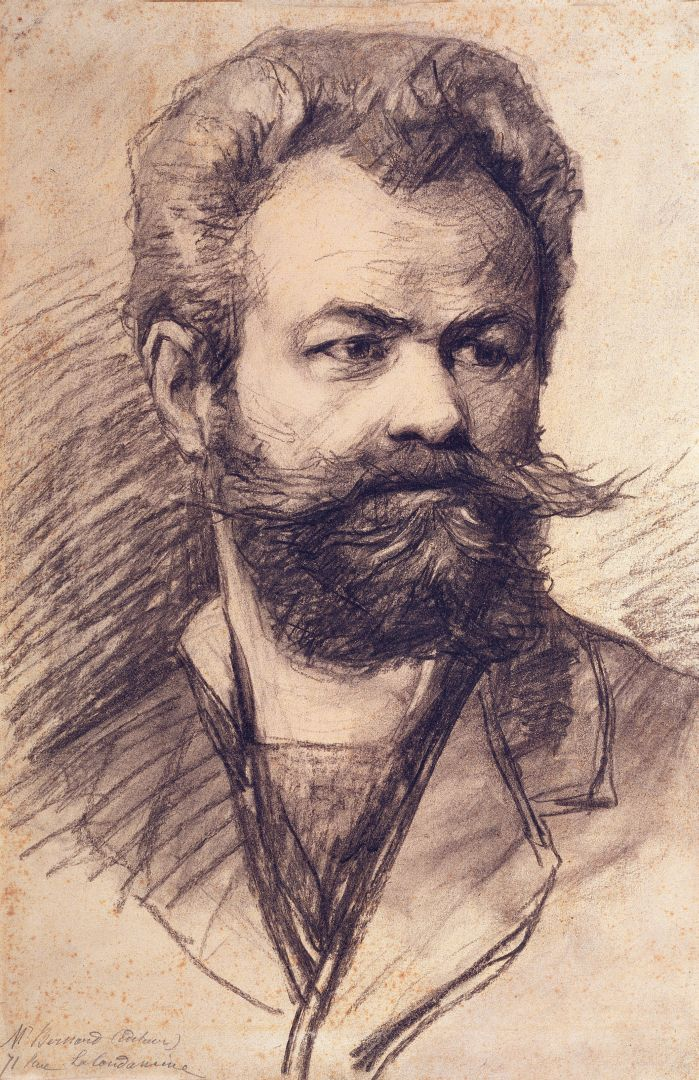
- Self-portrait drawing (1870s)
- Born: Mihály Leó Lieb; 20 February 1844; Munkács, Kingdom of Hungary (now Mukachevo, Ukraine)
- Died: 1 May 1900 (aged 56); Endenich, Bonn, German Empire
- Known for: Painter
- Movement: Realism, Düsseldorf school of painting
- Spouse: Cecile Papier
- Awards: Gold Medal (Paris Salon 1870)

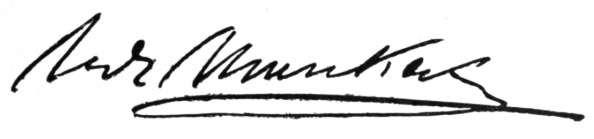
Mihály Munkácsy's signature

Mihály Munkácsy (Hungarian pronunciation: [ˈmihaːj ˈmuŋkaːtʃi]; 20 February 1844 – 1 May 1900) was a Hungarian painter. He earned international reputation with his genre pictures and large-scale biblical paintings.

== Early years ==
Munkácsy was born as Mihály Leó Lieb (Hungarian: Lieb Mihály Leó) to Mihály Lieb, a bureaucrat of Bavarian origin, and Cecília Reök, in Munkács, Hungary, Austrian Empire, the town from which he later adopted his pseudonym. After being apprenticed to itinerant painter Elek Szamossy, Munkácsy went to Pest, the largest city in Hungary (now part of Budapest), where he sought the patronage of established artists. With the help of the landscape artist Antal Ligeti, he received a state grant to study abroad. In 1865, he studied at the Academy of Vienna under Karl Rahl. In 1866, he studied at the Munich Academy, and in 1868 he moved to the Kunstakademie Düsseldorf to study with the popular genre painter Ludwig Knaus. In 1867, he travelled to Paris to see the Universal Exposition.

After his Paris trip, his style became lighter, with broader brushstrokes and tonal colour schemes - he was probably influenced by modern French painting seen at the Exposition.

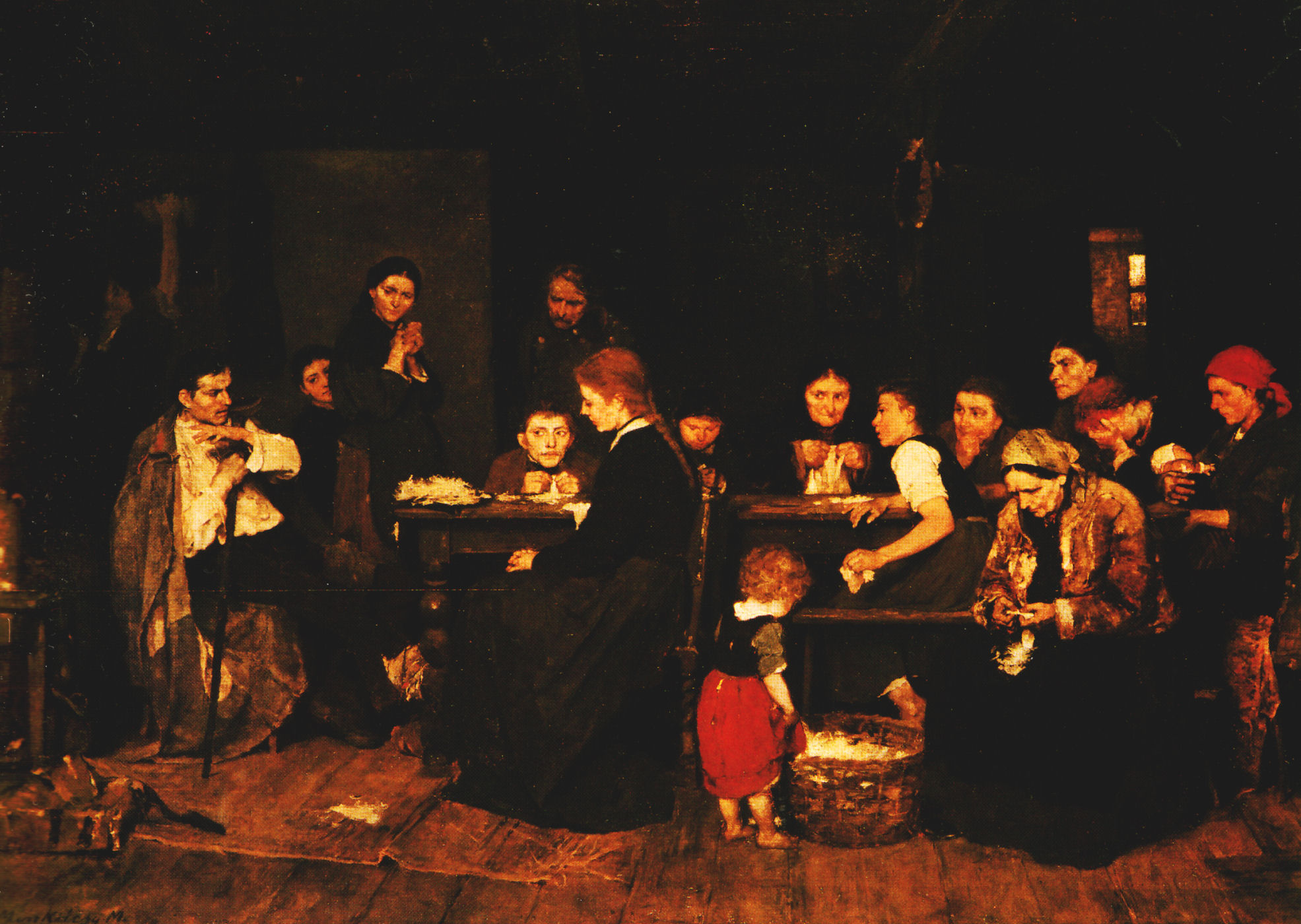
Pluckmakers (Tépéscsinálók) by Mihály Munkácsy (1871)

In his early career Munkácsy painted mainly scenes from the daily lives of peasants and poor people. First he followed the colourful, theatrical style of contemporary Hungarian genre painters (e. g. Károly Lotz, János Jankó), for example in The Cauldron (1864) or Easter Merrymaking (1865). In the next years he paid more attention to the landscape around his figures (Storm in the Puszta, 1867). From the Düsseldorf genre painters he learnt to represent different emotions in his figures and to treat them as a group (The Last Day of a Condemned Man, 1869). He is associated with the Düsseldorf school of painting.

== The Last Day of a Condemned Man ==
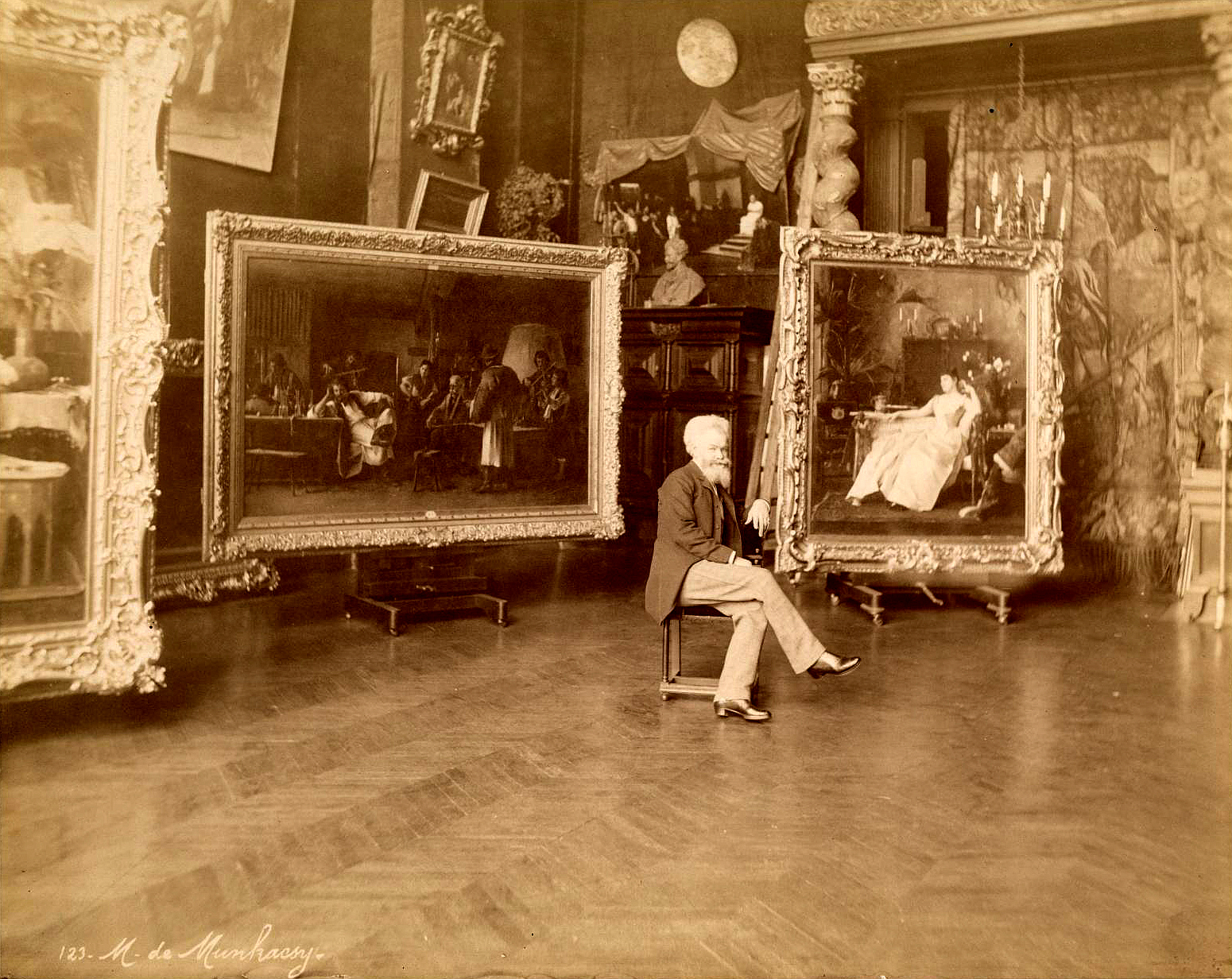
Mihály Munkácsy in his studio

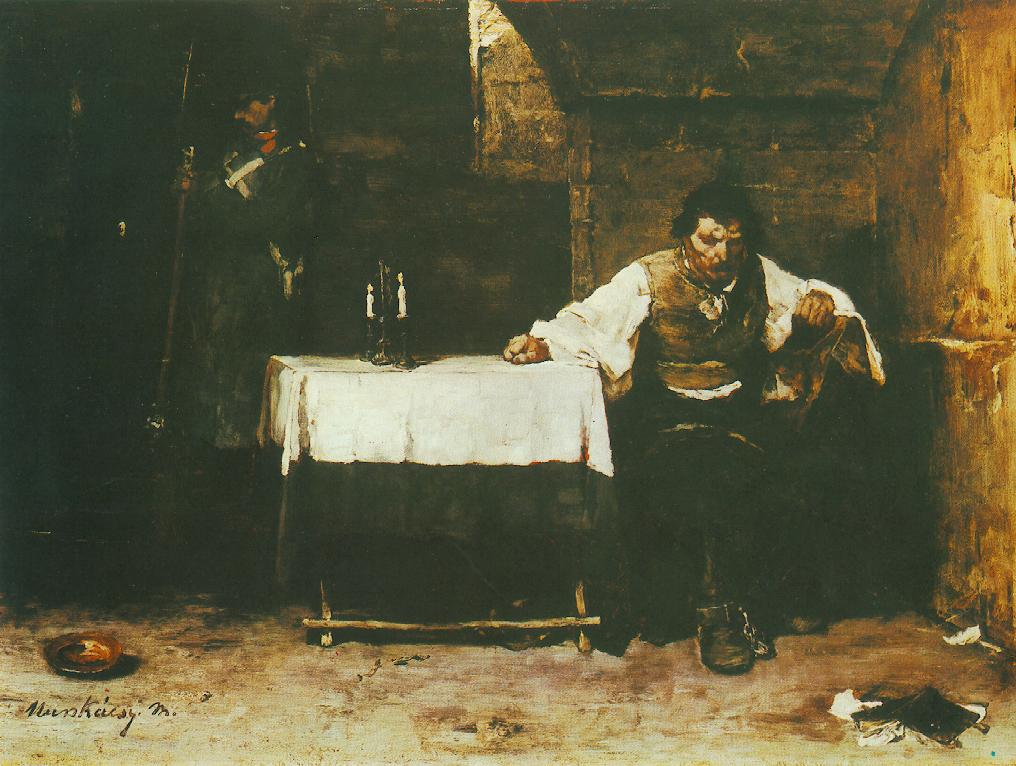
The Last Day of a Condemned Man, 1869

In 1869, Munkácsy painted his much acclaimed work The Last Day of a Condemned Man, considered his first masterpiece. The picture was rewarded with the Gold Medal of the Paris Salon in 1870. It made Munkácsy a popular painter in an instant. It suggests torture caused by oppression, moral uncertainty and reactions to an impending tragic end in visual form. However, it aptly captures the capabilities of the Hungarian master in painting.

Munkácsy, together with his friend, the landscapist László Paál, moved to Paris, where he lived until the end of his life. He continued to paint genre pictures like Making Lint (1871) and Woman Gathering Brushwood (1873). The zenith of his career was between 1873 and 1875, when he painted Midnight Ramblers, Farewell, Churning Woman, and Pawnshop. He married the widow of Baron de Marches in 1874, after which his style evolved; departing from the typical subjects of realism, he produced colourful salon paintings and still lifes.

In the late 1870s he also worked in Barbizon, together with Paál, and painted fresh, richly coloured landscapes, such as Dusty Road, Corn Field, and Walking in the Woods. The assimilation of László Paál's style is apparent in the landscapes painted during the 1880s, such as Avenue and The Colpach Park. His realist portraits, including of Franz Liszt and of Cardinal Haynald, were also made during this time.

In 1878, he painted a historical genre picture, The Blind Milton Dictating Paradise Lost to his Daughters, which marked a new milestone in his oeuvre. It is set in a richly furnished room. The picture was bought (and successfully sold) by Austrian-born art dealer Charles Sedelmeyer, who offered Munkácsy a ten-year contract. This deal made Munkácsy wealthy and an established member of the Paris art world.

== Trilogy ==
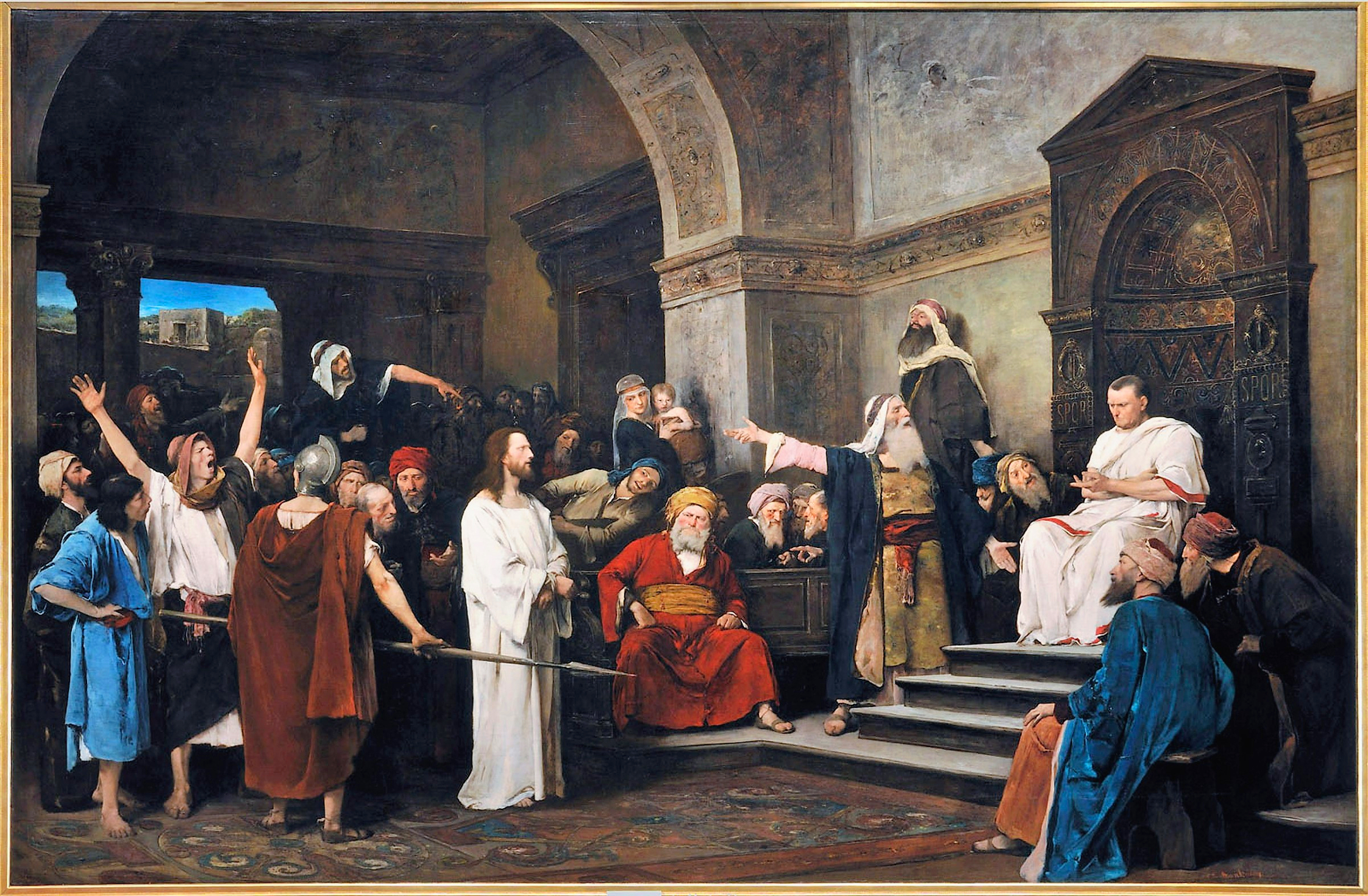
Christ in front of Pilate, 1881

Sedelmeyer wanted Munkácsy to paint large-scale pictures which could be exhibited on their own. They decided that a subject taken from the Bible would be most suitable. In 1882 Munkácsy painted Christ in front of Pilate, followed by Golgotha in 1884. The trilogy was completed with Ecce Homo in 1896.

Sedelmeyer took these three huge paintings on tour across Europe and the United States. The first two were purchased by US department store magnate John Wanamaker. After Wanamaker's death they were exhibited in the Grand Court of his Philadelphia store every Easter, with special Lenten music programs often arranged around them. The spaciousness of the Grand Court favorably accommodated the paintings' heroic size. During other parts of the year they were kept in a special vault adjacent to the Wanamaker Organ. Wanamaker reportedly paid the highest price for its time ever paid to a living artist. For years the Hungarian government sought to gain ownership. When the store chain was bought by Michigan shopping-mall magnate A. Alfred Taubman, the popular paintings were quietly auctioned in 1988, Joey and Toby Tanenbaum bought Christ in front of Pilate, and they donated it to the Art Gallery of Hamilton (AGH) in 2002. The AGH loaned it to the Déri Museum in Debrecen from 2002 until 2007, and again from 2009 until 2014. In 2009, all three were installed in a special wing of the Déri Museum. At that point, Ecce Homo! (1896) and Golgotha (1884) were respectively owned by the Hungarian state and by Hungarian-American art collector Imre Pákh. After the painting was returned to Canada, the Hungarian government sought to purchase it outright and in February 2014, it bought the painting for $5.7 million.

Munkácsy did not abandon genre painting, but his settings changed. In the 1880s he painted many salon pictures, set in lavishly furnished homes of rich people. His most often depicted subjects were motherhood (Baby's Visitors, 1879), the happy moments of domestic life (The Father's Birthday, 1882), children and animals (Two Families in the Salon, 1880). His elegantly dressed, dainty young women also appear in landscape settings (Three Ladies in the Park, 1886). These pictures were extremely popular (especially among US buyers) and fetched high prices. Beside these urban subjects Munkácsy also continued to paint rural scenes and dramatic, intensely emotional landscapes.

== Last phase: 1887–1896 ==
Towards the end of his career he painted two monumental works: Hungarian Conquest for the House of Parliament, and a fresco, Apotheosis of Renaissance, for the ceiling of Kunsthistoriches Museum in Vienna.

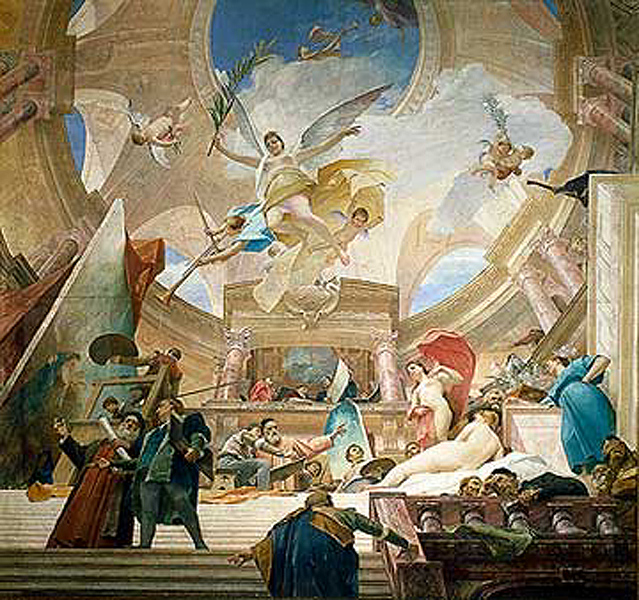
Glorification of the Renaissance, ceiling painting of the grand staircase of the Kunsthistorisches Museum in Vienna, 1888

He was commissioned to paint the large ceiling painting of the Kunsthistorisches Museum in Vienna. The work, completed in 1888, was titled Glorification of the Renaissance.

Although Munkácsy, who was very conscious about earthly comfort and social prestige, became a celebrity, he was always unsure and always questioning his own talent. By the 1890s, his depression grew into a severe mental illness which was probably intensified by the syphilis which he contracted in his youth. His last pictures are troubled and sometimes even bizarre (e.g. Victim of Flowers, 1896).

Towards the end of his life when disease was demanding more and more of his energy and finally darkness descended on his mind, he completed two pictures involving several figures. In one of them, Strike (1896), he illustrated the subject of the picture, rather unusual at his time, in a new style of character portrayal with the old passionate approach only superficially present.

== Death ==
In the summer of 1896 Munkácsy's health sharply declined. After treatment in Baden-Baden, he retired to Colpach and Paris. Later he was taken to a mental hospital at Endenich near Bonn. He collapsed and died there on 1 May 1900. On 9 May he was buried in the Kerepesi Cemetery, Budapest.

== Legacy ==
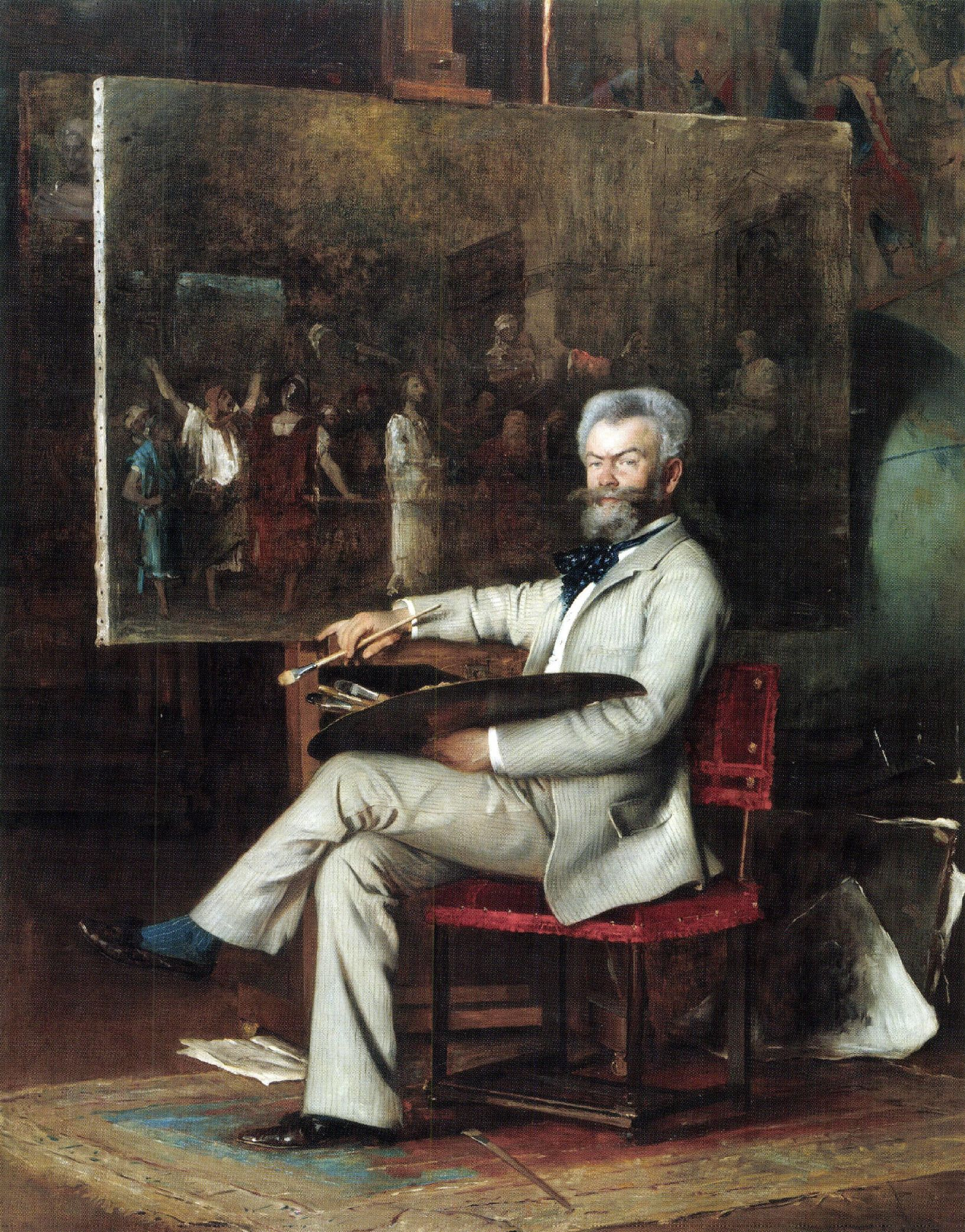
Portrait of Mihály Munkácsy in his studio by Hans Temple (1887)

Neither 19th century visual art nor the historical developments of Hungarian art can be discussed without considering Munkácsy's contributions. His works are considered the apogee of national painting. He was a standard-setter, an oeuvre of reference value. He was one of the few with whom the antiquated colour techniques of 19th century Austro-Hungarian painting reached its most powerful and most lavish expression.

In 2005, the Hungarian National Gallery organized in Budapest the first ever comprehensive exhibition of Munkácsy's paintings scattered throughout the world. As many as 120 pieces were borrowed from different institutions, museums and private collections. The exhibition catalogue published on the occasion, entitled Munkácsy a nagyvilágban (Munkácsy in the World) also included a number of reproductions of his paintings. The three-month exhibition was a feast for Hungarians who had little access to his original works. Paintings by Munkacsy are in the Milwaukee Art Museum, Dayton Institute of Art (Ohio), and the Albany (New York) Museum of Art and History, and The Condemned is part of the Founding Collection at the Frye Art Museum in Seattle (Washington). His paintings also hang in the Arad Art Museum (Romania) and the Ferenc Mora Art Museum (Szeged, Hungary).

- Mihály Munkácsy is honored by Hungary by issuing a postage stamps: on 1 July 1932 which bears his portrait; on 18 March 1977 his painting “Flowers” was depicted on a postage stamp in the series Flowers by Hungarian Painters.
- Honored by Luxembourg by issuing two postage stamps on 20 May 1996.
- A crater on the planet Mercury was named in his honor.

== Bibliography ==
- James Joyce "Royal Hibernian Academy 'Ecce Homo'", 1899.
- Végvári, Lajos: Munkácsy Mihály élete és művei (the Life and Work of Mihály Munkácsy), Budapest, 1958.
- Munkácsy a nagyvilágban / Munkácsy in the World. Exhibition Catalogue. Ed. by Gosztonyi, Ferenc. Hungarian National Gallery – Szemimpex Kiadó, Budapest, 2005.
