= Daniel Halasz =

Swedish media executive

Daniel Halasz (born in 1976 in Gothenburg, Sweden) is an advertising executive living and working in Copenhagen, Denmark. He is best known for his work within content marketing and advertising for which his campaigns has won numerous awards. He is the former CEO and founder of the award-winning production companies Feist ApS and DBM, and currently holds the position as Head of Production at Grey Group in Denmark, where he's also part of the leadership team.

Halasz grew up in Gothenburg, Sweden and later lived in Barcelona, Hawaii, Los Angeles, London, and Copenhagen. After receiving a BA in Communications, Halasz was one of only 12 students accepted to the prestigious MA degree in Film & TV Producing from Royal Holloway, University of London. Halasz also holds an associate degree in Journalism from Gothenburg University.

Halasz has worked as a full-time Producer and Creative Director for companies such as Viasat Broadcasting, The Walt Disney Company and Discovery Communications. The two companies he founded have developed campaigns for Tier 1 brands such as Audi, Red Bull, HBO, Velux and IBM.

In 2004 Halasz directed and produced the documentary "Söndrige Sondre" (Broken Brother) which premiered at The Gothenburg International Film Festival and later aired on the Swedish TV channel SVT 2. The documentary, which was critical to his brother's diagnosis of schizophrenia and incarceration to a mental hospital, stirred up a public debate about the Swedish mental healthcare system. The film eventually led to his brother's release from the mental institution.

Halasz has won a number of awards throughout his career, most notably Cannes Lions, Effie Awards and the Promax BDA awards for excellence in Content Marketing & Promotion. In 2014, Halasz also received the honorary ´Best Marketing Team of the Year´ award from Promax BDA Europe for his role in Discovery Networks Nordic's in-house marketing team.

Halasz is the grand nephew of the pioneering animator John Halas, known for movies such as Animal Farm and Snip & Snap.

https://dk.linkedin.com/in/danielhalasz8
