= Rezső Móder =

Rezső Móder (born July 14, 1954, in Dunaújváros, Hungary) is a Hungarian sculptor, graphic artist, painter.

Rezső Móder participated with his metal art sculptor in the International Steel Sculpture Workshop and Symposium in 1987. During his education his teacher was Károly Koffán, Pál Gerzson. Rezső Móder got a lot of honors, won a lot of awards, one of them is the Munkácsy Mihály Award from 2001. Rezső was reward with Hincz Gyula Award in 1974, with Pro Pentele Award in 2005. Rezső Móder was the leader of the "Light – Voice – Color – Place" Contemporary art Festival and the organizer Instrumentum mobile festivals. Rezső Móder with dr. János Sipos founded the Dunaújvárosi Art Association in 1997. His Musical Sculpture Park was established in 1996. Móder was active to create art associations such as Society of Graphic Artists, Hungarian Society of Painters, Hungarian Sculptors Society.

== International ==
- 2003 Church Gallery, Komárno, Slovakia
- 2000 Kunsthalle Budapest, Budapest
- 1998 Institute of Contemporary Art, Dunaújváros
- 1997 Institut français de Budapest
- 1990 Gallery of Miskolc, Miskolc
- 1989 Kunsthalle Györ

== Links ==
- bio of Rezső Móder
