= Mihály Schéner =

Hungarian sculptor, painter, graphic artist, and ceramist

Mihály Schéner (Medgyesegyháza, Hungary, January 9, 1923 – Budapest, May 11, 2009) was a Hungarian sculptor, painter, graphic artist, and ceramist.

About 60 of Schéner's metal sculptures are on display in International Steel Sculpture Workshop and Symposium near the Danube. He created sculptures at the Wood Sculpture Artist Colony in Nagyatád. Public sculptures are on display around the city of Szombathely. Schéner has traveled to Paris and Stockholm. Some of Schéner's paintings are on display in the Mall Gallery and the Grosvenor Gallery, both located in London.

== Links ==
- Profile of Mihály Schéner
