= Károly Halász =

Hungarian painter (1946–2016)

Károly (Hopp-)Halász
- Born: 28 January 1946; Paks, Hungary
- Died: 27 November 2016 (aged 70); Budapest, Hungary
- Education: Pécs Arts Grammar School
- Known for: multimedia art, sculpture, installation art, video art, and performance

Károly Halász (Károly Hopp-Halász; 28 January 1946 – 27 November 2016) was a Hungarian multimedia artist and co-founder of the Hungarian neo-avant-garde artist group Pécs Workshop (Pécsi Műhely). His multi-faceted œuvre can be seen as an extension of a constructivist language – which remained central throughout his career – to a wide range of media from video, performance, and installation to painting, sculpture, and graphics, as well as various thematic focuses from the deconstruction of mass media to institutional critique.

== Biography ==
=== Early life ===
Halász, one of two children of a town official and a housewife, was born in Paks on 28 January 1946. Between 1961 and 1965, he was a student in the department of decorative painting at the Pécs Arts Grammar School. He became familiar with and influenced by the international neo-avant-garde tendencies – especially Op and Pop Art – by attending the lectures of Géza Perneczky, one of the most influential Hungarian art historians of the time. After graduation, Halász started to work at the Bauxite Mine of Pécs as a decorative artist, an experience that was influential in the formation of his own style and served as a common denominator among a group of young artists, gathered around artist and teacher Ferenc Lantos (1929 – 2014).

=== Early works and the foundation of the Pécs Workshop (1968–1972) ===
The Studio of Applied Arts of Pécs was formed by Lantos and a circle of committed former students of the Pécs Arts Grammar School as a platform for collaborative experimentation and (self-)education. The neo-avant-garde artist group Pécs Workshop (Pécsi Műhely) grew out from this studio, co-founded by Halász, Károly Kismányoky (1943–2018), Sándor Pinczehelyi (1946) Ferenc Ficzek (1947 – 1987) and Kálmán Szijártó (1946) in 1968 (formally in 1970). In the early period of the group, neo-constructivist tendencies were dominant, inspired by summer workshops in the enamel factory of Bonyhád between 1969 and 1971, where they created geometric compositions with industrial enamel in collaboration with the factory workers. Halász, under the influence of Bauhaus and Op art, also created numerous geometric paintings (e.g. Color Series, 1970) and enamel works (e.g. Radial Enamel (Red-Blue), 1969, Structures with Pipes, 1970) as well as sculptures (e.g. Cubes, 1972). In 1971, he found the motive of high stand, for him a sort of geometric equivalent of Dürer's magic square in Melencolia I, which led to the High Stand series, his largest geometric-conceptual body of work, that embodied in numerous montages, paintings, and sculptures (e.g. Sculpture I-III, 1978).

=== Conceptual works and performances (1972–1982) ===
From 1971, the focus of the Pécs Workshop, including Halász, shifted towards Conceptual, Pop and Land Art. Halász started a formative European tour in 1972, during which he attended the Documenta 5 at Kassel, a 100-day series of performances and events, directed by Harald Szeeman.

==== Alternative museums (Minimuseum, Whatnot Museum, Museum of the Future, etc.) ====
Halász's frequent journeys, the constant experience of transition, and the radically different possibilities and perspectives of art in West- and East-Europe led to the creation of portable and evanescent alternative "museums". These works can be associated with the institutional critique of the documenta's section "artist's museums", with works by Marcel Broothaers, Herbert Dristel, Ben Vautier, and Marcel Duchamp, while they also mirrored the conditions of exhibiting progressive art in a socialist country, where modern and neo-avant-garde tendencies were officially rejected and therefore not represented by art institutions. Whatnot Museum (1972) consists of a shelving unit with jam jars, resembling a pantry, with reproductions from Kazimir Malevich's Black Square to Robert Smithson's Spiral Jetty and Halász's own works. In the artist's words: "they are thoughts, far-off works, and one's own works out away for use in the future". This future usage of artworks is envisioned in The Museum of the Future (1977), a set of injection ampoules, with which, instead of visiting and contemplating, one can simply injects the experience of artworks from Lynda Benglis, Mario Merz, Marcel Broodthaers, Wolf Vostell, Lucas Samaras and others. This tongue-in-cheek vision resembles the words of the art historian Éva Körner on Hungarian Conceptual art that "the impact of Western art came here as a serum, and everybody used it to satisfy their own burning needs."

==== Works with television (Modulated Television, Private transmission, Pseudo-video) ====
Inspired by the writings and the works of László Moholy-Nagy, he started to experiment with photography and lightboxes, which led to the idea of TV object, a geometrical composition of two intersecting cuboids from steel, fixed on a television screen. This served as an arranging filter for television programs like the West Germany-Brazil soccer match in 1973, creating a hyperconstructed/deconstructed experience and chance-compositions, cached by the camera (e.g. Modulated Television II [1972], Modulated Television III [1973]). In Private Transmission (1974) he himself became the program, as he lived and slept in the empty shell of a TV for a day, while he created "Pseudo-videos" (1975) by replacing the TV screen with mirrors set at right angles to each other, which led to geometric self-portraits. Combining and extending Pseudo video and Private Transmission, Halász made a complex half-an-hour video action An Indian in Holland (1978) in Amsterdam Videoheads. According to the documentation of LIMA, "'Indian’ refers to "someone who lives far away from Western society, has no knowledge of technological and electronic developments, and therefore uses the medium more freely". Accordingly, Halász experimented with unusual ways of using television, from painting over his face on the monitor with the help of a closed-circuit set-up to sitting cross-legged inside the empty TV cabinet.

=== Later life and career ===
He moved back to his hometown Paks in 1979, and as a public educator, he founded the Paks Visual Experimental Retreat, an annually organized summer camp for artists, in the spirit of the Studio of Applied Arts of Pécs. In 1991, Halász also co-founded and was appointed as the first director of the Paks Pallery based on his neo-avant-garde collection. He received the Mihály Munkácsy Prize, the highest Hungarian state award for outstanding œuvres in fine arts, in 2006. After a long-term illness, he died in Paks on 27 November 2016.

From the second half of the eighties, he returned to painting and joined the neo geo movement (Monolith Structures [1987–1988], Neo-Geo-pictures [1989];, Picture Plans [1991–2004]). In his Open Geometry series, from 1987, he juxtaposed elements of neo geo stripes and dots with his photographs, mainly depicting body parts of people from ethnic minorities., while some pieces from the Monolith Structures were combined with monochrome columns and mundane objects, such as chairs and baskets.

== Exhibitions ==
Solo exhibitions

(selected)

1969 – Fiatal Művészek Klubja, Budapest (with Ferenc Ficzek)

1982 – King St. Stephen Museum, Székesfehérvár

1984 – Atelier Perneczky, Köln

1992 – Künstlerhaus Bethanien, Berlin (with Imre Bukta)

1997 – Geometria Aperta, Galeria Bedoli, Viedana

2010 – Kofferbe pakolt konstruktivizmus, Paksi Képtár, Paks

2016 – Magasles, acb Gallery, Budapest

Group exhibitions

(selected)

1969 – Pécsi Műhely, Pincegaléria, Pécs

1977 – CAYC International Video Festival, Barcelona

1978 – Hongaarse Konstruktivsche Kunst, 1920–1970, Hertogenbosch–Utrecht–Schiedam

1979 – Works and Words, De Appel, Amsterdam

1980 – Pécsi Műhely 1970–1980, Csók István Gallery, Székesfehérvár; MMK, Paks

1982 – Új-szenzibilitás, Fészek Gallery, Budapest

1985 – Drei Generationen Hungarischer Künstler, Neue Galerie am Landesmuseum Joanneum, Graz

1987 – Neue Senzibilitat, Ungarische Künstler der 80er Jahre, Museum der Kunst, Dortmund

1991 – Positionen. Ungarische Kunst der 90er Jahre, Künstlerwerkstatt, München

2009 – Akzent Ungarn, Neue Galerie am Landesmuseum Joanneum, Graz

2017 – Parallel Avant-garde. Pécs Workshop 1968–1980, Ludwig Museum, Budapest

== Works in collections ==
(selected)

Gallery of Modern Hungarian Art, Pécs

Hungarian National Gallery, Budapest

King St. Stephen Museum, Székesfehérvár

Kiscell Museum, Budapest

LIMA, Amsterdam

Ludwig Museum – Museum of Contemporary Art, Budapest

Marinko Sudac Collection, Zagreb

Neue Galerie am Landesmuseum Joanneum, Graz

== Awards ==
(selected)

1979 – Council of Ministers of the People's Republic of Hungary

1996 – Order of Merit of the Hungarian Republic Knight Cross

1997 – Fine Artists' Prize of the Soros Foundation

2006 – Mihály Munkácsy Prize
