= List of Hungarian sculptors =

This is a list of Hungarian sculptors. For painters see List of Hungarian painters

== A ==
- Makrisz Agamemnon (1913–1993)
- Károly Antal (1909–1994)
- Maurice Ascalon (1913–2003)

== B ==
- Károly Bebo (1712–1779)
- András Beck (1911–1985)
- Fülöp Ö. Beck (1873–1945)
- István Beöthy (1897–1961)
- Lajos Berán (1882–1943)
- László Beszédes (1874–1922)
- Miklós Borsos (1906–1990)
- Jeno Bory (1879–1959)

== C ==
- Heinrich Charasky (1656–1710)
- Joseph Csaky (József Csáky) (1888–1971)
- Marianne Csaky (1959–)

== D ==
- Gyula Donáth (1850–1909)
- Orshi Drozdik (1946–)

== E ==
- Erzsébet Schaár (1908–1975)

== F ==
- János Fadrusz (1858–1903)
- Sándor Boldogfai Farkas (1907–1970)
- Béni Ferenczy (1890–1967)
- István Ferenczy (1792–1856)
- Magda Frank (1914–2010)

== H ==
- János Horvay (1873–1944)

== I ==
- Miklós Izsó (1831–1875)

== K ==
- Ede Kallós (1866–1950)
- János Kass (1927–2010)
- Mihály Kolodko (1978–)
- Sámuel Kornél (1883–1914)
- Margit Kovács (1902–1977)
- László Kutas (1936–2023)

== L ==
- Petri Lajos (1884–1963)
- László Lakner (1936–)
- Miklós Ligeti (1871–1944)

== M ==
- Géza Maróti (1875–1941)
- László Marton (1925–2008)
- Ferenc Medgyessy (1881–1958)
- Gustave Miklos (1888–1967)
- Ödön Moiret (1883–1968)

== P ==
- János Pásztor (1881–1945)
- Pál Pátzay (1896–1979)
- Lajos Petri (1884–1963)

== R ==
- József Reményi (1887–1977)
- József Róna (1861–1939)

== S ==
- Mihály Schéner (1923–2009)
- Alajos Stróbl (1856–1926)
- Zsigmond Kisfaludi Stróbl (1884–1975)
- István Szentgyörgyi (1881–1938)
- László Szlávics, Jr. (1959–)

== T ==
- Eduard Telcs (1872–1948)
- Amerigo Tot (Tóth Imre) (1909–1984)

== V ==
- Imre Varga (1923–2019)
- György Vastagh (1868–1946)

== W ==
- Nándor Wagner (1922–1997)
- József Lénárd Wéber (1702–1773)

== Z ==
- György Zala (1858–1937)
- Rudolf Züllich (1813–1890)

== See also ==
- List of Hungarians
- List of sculptors
