= Oil bleaching =

Oil bleaching (Hungarian: olajszőkítés) is the process of chemically converting gas oil that has been rendered unfit for use as a fuel into a usable fuel. Oil refining was one of the most profitable illegal "businesses" in Hungary after the fall of communism, estimated to have saved hundreds of billions of forints in the 1990s. The "oil scandal" started in 1991–1992, but became more widespread from 1993.

== Before bleaching ==
In the 1970s, before the two oil crises, the price of various oils (petrol, diesel) was low. A large proportion of Hungarian households heated their homes with household heating oil (HTO). The oil price explosion that occurred at the time also had an effect in Hungary, but HTO could be bought cheaper, for half or even a third of the price, because of the state subsidy on it, than gas oil, which has the exact same composition. Consequently, many people bought HTO and used it in vehicles.

== Ferrocene and bleaching ==
In 1990, a government decree stipulated that fuel oil must be coloured with an additive. To do this, a compound called ferrocene was used, which dyed the oil red. The fuel oil coloured by the addition of ferrocene became unsuitable for use as a motor vehicle fuel because it destroyed the engine in such quantities. The products imported as fuel oil were to be coloured at customs, which opened the door to abuse. If the customs officer was successfully bribed, the consignment could be sold as diesel without further interference.

If the dye was already in the oil, it was neutralised by acidification: the sulphuric acid and other chemicals would bring the oil back to its original colour - this was called oil colouring. In the meantime, the price difference between HTO and diesel oil became even greater. The peak was in 1994, when it was 44 forints per litre. For the bleachers, this was a small investment and a big profit, but it also happened that, as the companies were fictitious, they did not even pay the oil purchase price.

== Steps against bleaching ==
In August 1993, a steering committee was set up in the Ministry of Industry and Trade to curb the emerging oil mafia. From 1 January 1995, fuel oil was only sold on tickets, but the tickets were counterfeit. At that time, heating oil was bought for several times the price of the officially issued tickets, and in the 1994-1995 heating season 350 million litres more HTO were consumed than was needed to heat households. In 1995 the prices of fuel oil and diesel were standardised. The move was a good one, with many people giving up on squeezing. After that, the business was importing petroleum derivatives, for which less duty had to be paid. Only the really capital-intensive companies, which had been granted import licences, were able to do this. These companies imported spindle oil, household oil and industrial oil, which they sold as diesel oil. Customs had to be bribed to do this. Finally, in 1998, an excise duty was imposed on petroleum products, to be collected immediately. These measures significantly reduced the scope for misuse of oil.

== Parliamentary committee of inquiry ==
In February 2000, on the initiative of FKGP politician and MP László Pallag, Parliament set up an ad hoc committee to investigate the oil and related corruption cases. On 8 June, Zsolt Nógrádi, who claimed to be a member of the oil mafia in Bács-Kiskun County, made shocking allegations during his committee hearing: he spoke about the involvement of several leading politicians and three parliamentary parties, as well as the customs and finance police and the police. He also accused Sándor Pintér, former Minister of the Interior and National Police Chief, Iván Szabó, former Finance Minister and Sándor Lezsák, former President of the MDF, among others, of collaborating with the oil mafia. However, no evidence has been found and the parties involved have filed and won lawsuits against Pallag, who made his testimony public.

According to an investigation report published by the Prosecutor General's Office in March 2000, between 1991 and 1999, 4,300 offences - counterfeiting, smuggling, customs fraud - were committed in the distribution of petroleum products. Most of the 340 defendants on trial were sentenced to prison. According to the document, in many cases the perpetrators could not be found and the work of the criminal authorities was hampered by problems of legal interpretation. To this day, new information continues to emerge, but the case cannot be closed once and for all. The former players in the oil affair are keeping each other at bay, and anyone who tries to tip the scales is endangering the whole system. For conspiratorial reasons, the oil tycoons have named themselves after Hungarian painters. "Rippl-Rónai" was Gábor Drobilich, "Tivadar Csontváry Kosztka" was Tamás Portik, and László Radnai was known as "Károly Lotz".

== Further information ==
- Joób Sándor (2007-06-29). "Republic of Hungary - oil republic". Index.hu.
- Csikász Brigitta (2007-06-24). "Tibor Karancsi: "Irén did not take the threats seriously"". HVG.hu.
- Sulinet - The oil bleaching
