= Miklós Borsos =

Hungarian sculptor and medallist

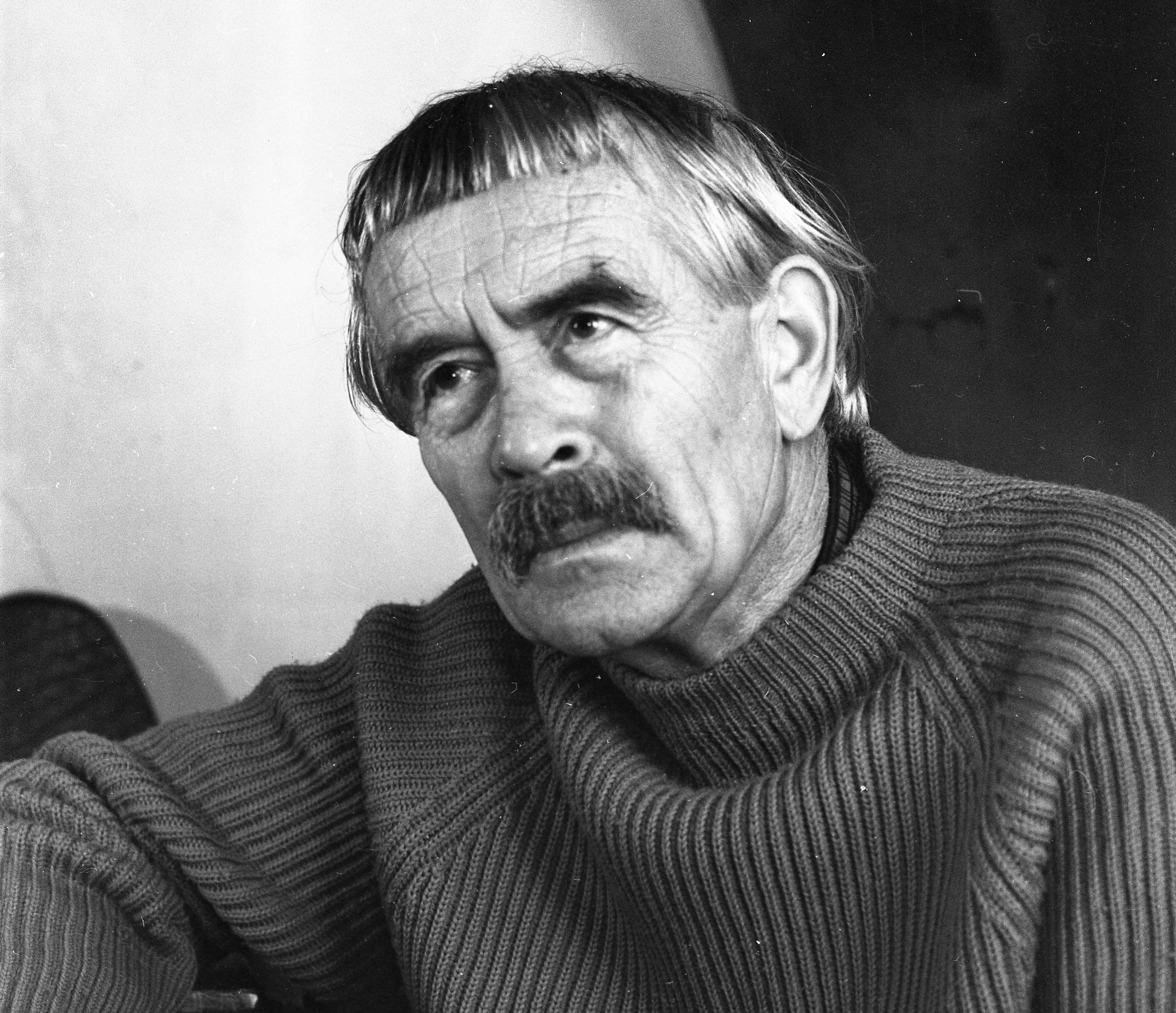
- Borsos in 1972
- Born: 13 August 1906; Nagyszeben, Kingdom of Hungary
- Died: 27 January 1990 (aged 83); Budapest, Hungary
- Occupation: sculptor

Miklós Borsos (13 August 1906 – 27 January 1990) was a Hungarian sculptor and medallist. His style integrated elements of archaic art and classicism with modern elements.

== Biography ==
Born in Nagyszeben, Transylvania, Kingdom of Hungary (present-day Sibiu, Romania), he and his family fled to Győr in 1916, after the Romanian invasion; they settled there in 1922. Borsos and his wife lived in the same Győr house until the end of World War II.

He became interested in art and particularly sculpture in the late 1920s. He initially began as a painter, he dedicated his interest to sculpture during the 1930s, and became accomplished in the latter art by 1940. In 1928 and 1929 he spent travelled from Venice to Marseille. In 1929 he briefly trained at the Hungarian University of Fine Arts under Oszkár Glatz, which was his only formal training.

Up to the end of the 1940s, Borsos' art was tightly connected to the modern Hungarian plastic art represented by Fülöp Ö. Beck, Béni Ferenczy, and Ferenc Medgyessy. From about 1950 onwards, he developed more intellectual, abstract, and experimental approaches. Borsos's form of expression and the subjects of his art were connected with the intensity of his experiences and views.

Borsos had his first public showing in 1941 in Budapest at the Tamás Galéria. He later had shows around Europe, including Linz, Austria (1964), Venice (1966), and Rome (1967), Zürich, Graz and Locarno in 1967.

Borsos made use of all sculptural genres, and enriched them with several new solutions. He developed embossing of copper plates (which was a rare technique at that point in history), and produced a number of sculptures for public places and sepulchral monuments focusing on a modern environmental culture which often bore a deep personal message and reflected great intimacy (combining symbolic motifs of natural life, as well as cultural values). Human and animal figures were common subject, and his forté was not in fine detail but in creating overall masterpieces.

Borsos also became focused on portrait art during the late 1950s and 1960s, where his work integrated aspects of nature, atmosphere, as well as cultural and spiritual traditions into a new genre of sculptural art. Works of this period include the Portrait of József Egry (1952), Sybilla Pannonica (1963), Lighea (1968), The Young Parca (1964), and Canticus Canticorum (1977).

In 1979, Borsos opened the Miklós Borsos Art Gallery in Győr, formerly a courthouse of the Győr Bishopric. It is situated in the oldest neighbourhood of the city, near the Saint Michael Chapel, and is now the Miklós Borsos City Art Museum.

== Awards ==
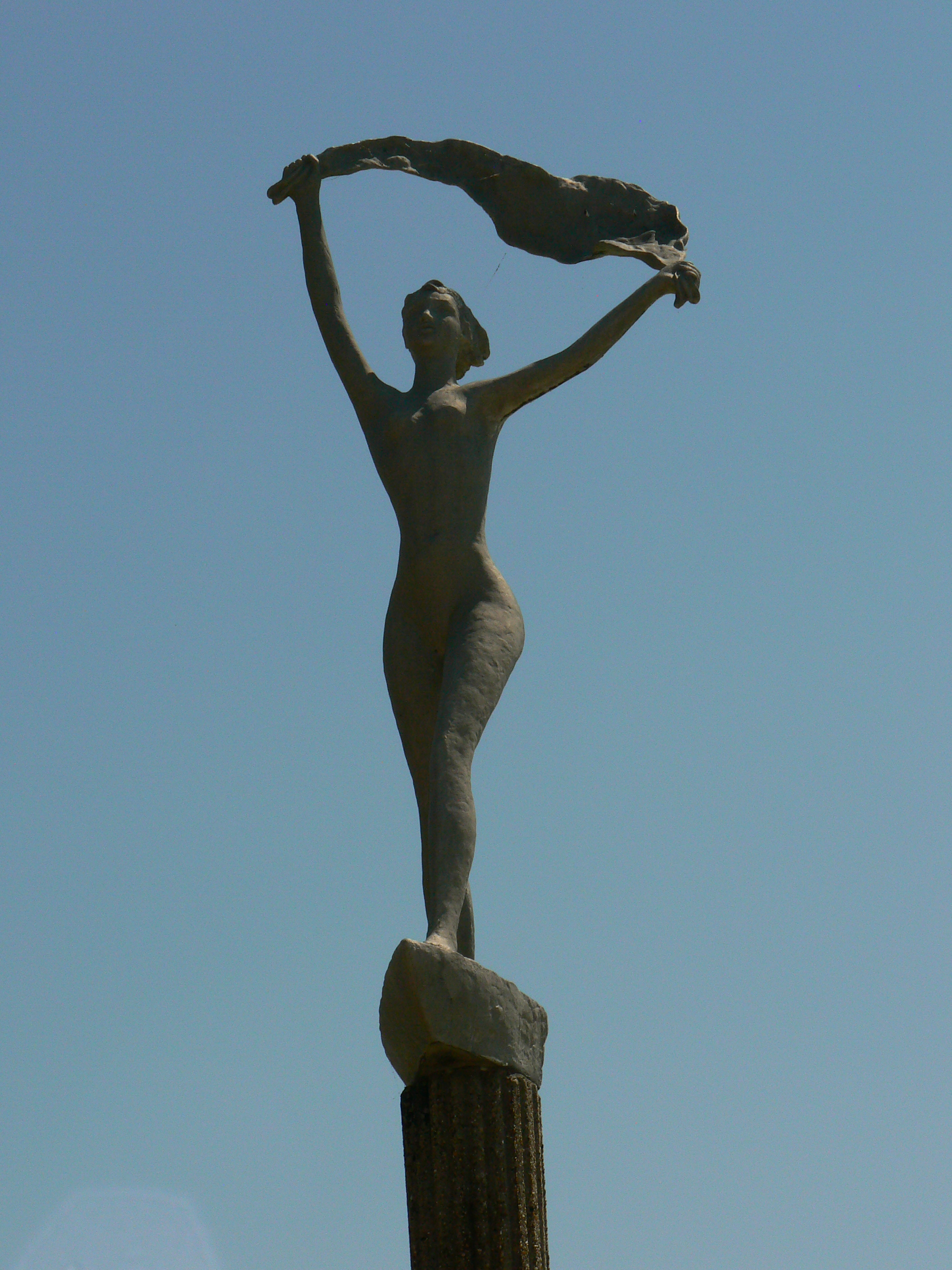
Sculpture in Balatonfüred

Miklós was awarded the title Artist of Merit of the Hungarian People's Republic in 1967. His other honors include:

- 1954 Munkácsy Award
- 1957 Kossuth Prize
- 1959 Premio Carrara
- 1969 National Small Sculpture Biennial, Pécs Pot
- 1972 Outstanding Artist
- 1977 First National Medal of Art, Béni Ferenczy Prize.
- 1950 Attila József Prize, 1950
- 1961 Rippl-Rónai Award, 1961
- 1963 Szegedi Nyári Tárlat Award, 1963
- 1964 József Egry Prize, 1964
