= Arnold Graffi =

German physician (1910–2006)

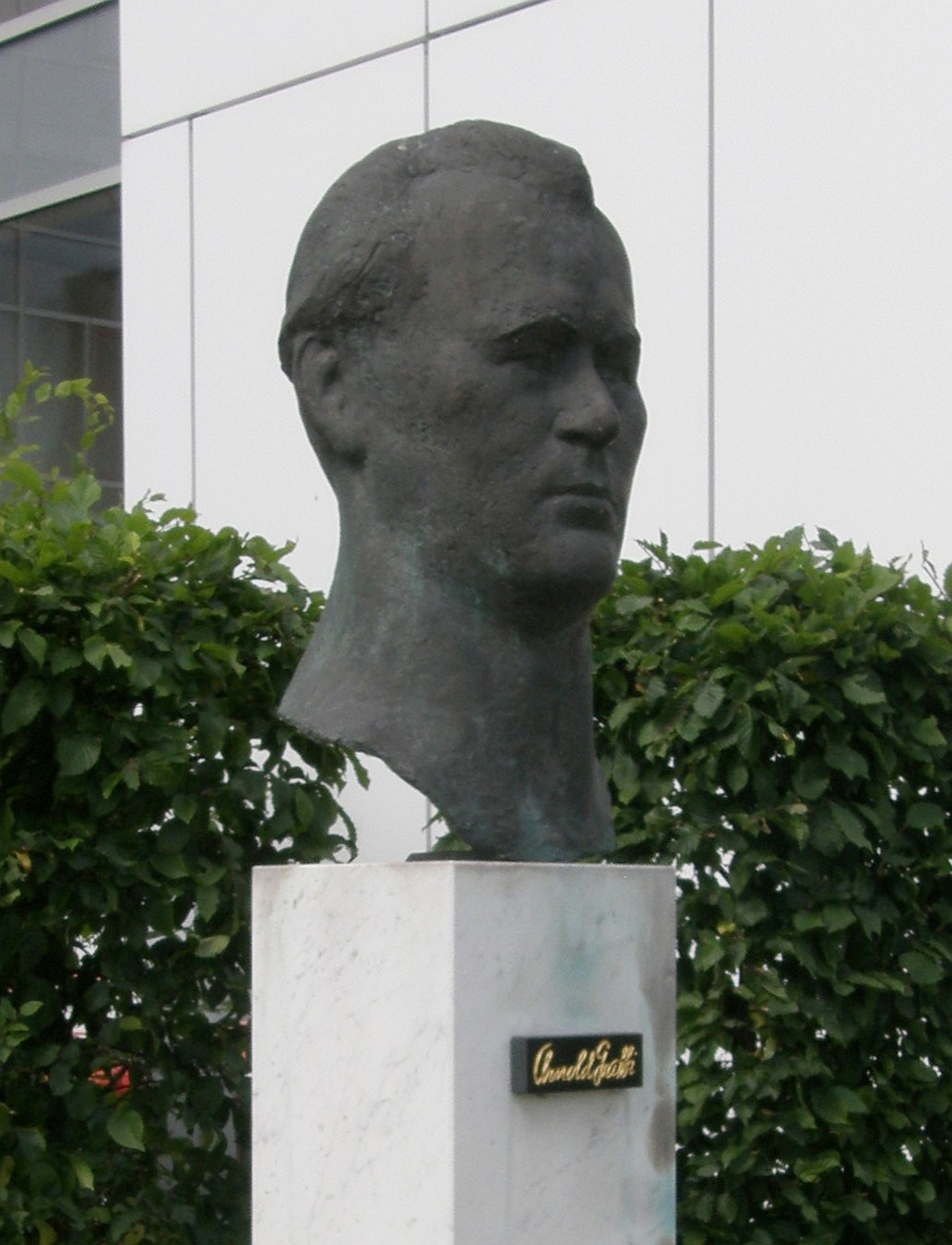
Bust of Arnold Graffi, by Gerhard Rommel.

Arnold Graffi (19 June 1910 – 30 January 2006) was a pioneering German doctor in the area of experimental cancer research. He was the first to identify viruses that induce tumours. He also studied chemical carcinogens. Along with Heinz Bielka he wrote an influential textbook on cancer research titled Probleme der Experimentellen Krebsforschung (1959).

== Life and work ==
Graffi was born in the Saxon town of Bistritz (Bistrița) in Transylvania, then part of Austria-Hungary. His father was a teacher. Graffi completed his gymnasium in 1928 and went to Germany where he studied medicine at Marburg, Leipzig, and Tübingen before receiving his doctorate at the Charité in Berlin. He was influenced by Albert Dietrich in Tübingen to study cancer. He studied cell culture with Tivadar Huzella, hormone research with Karl Junkmann at Schering labs and Otto Warburg at Berlin. Graffi worked under Richard Otto at the Paul Ehrlich Institute in Frankfurt. He taught at the Humboldt University of Berlin from 1949 becoming a professor in 1951 and working there until 1975, when he retired. In 1948 he worked at the newly established Institute of Medicine and Biology in Berlin-Buch under the directorship of Walter Friedrich. At the time of his retirement he was director of the Institute of Cancer Research.

Graffi made use of the fluorescence property of the carcinogen benz-pyrene to trace its movement through cells following its addition to the skins of mice. He noticed that it accumulated around the mitochondria which suggested to him that mutations of organelles might lead to cancer. In 1954 he discovered the tumor-inducing (retro)virus now known as the Graffi murine leukemia virus. He also found a hamster polyoma virus in 1967. After retirement Graffi continued to be involved in cancer research, but more in the area of chemotherapy and the problems related to it.

Graffi received many honors including the Academy of Natural Scientists Cothenius Medal (1977), the Paul Ehrlich and Ludwig Darmstaedter Prize (1979); and the Helmholtz Medal (1984). He also received an honorary doctorate from the University of Leipzig in 1990, and the Cross of the Order of Merit from the German government in 1995. Apart from his work he took an interest in art and was a watercolour landscape artist as well as a music composer. When he died in Berlin in 2006, his funeral service included several of his music compositions played on the organ.
