= Lajos Petri =

Hungarian sculptor

Lajos Petri (until 1928 Lajos Pick; 10 June 1884 – 25 August 1963) was a Hungarian sculptor of Jewish origin. His work was part of the art competitions at the 1928 Summer Olympics and the 1936 Summer Olympics. He was born in Szeged, Hungary and died in Budapest.

== Life ==
The Pick family was the owner of the famous Hungarian Pick Salami factory established by Márk Pick in 1869. The factory, owing to Italian workers, became a market leader in 1883, and it has remained the most reputed salami producer in the country ever since, especially noted for Winter Salami.

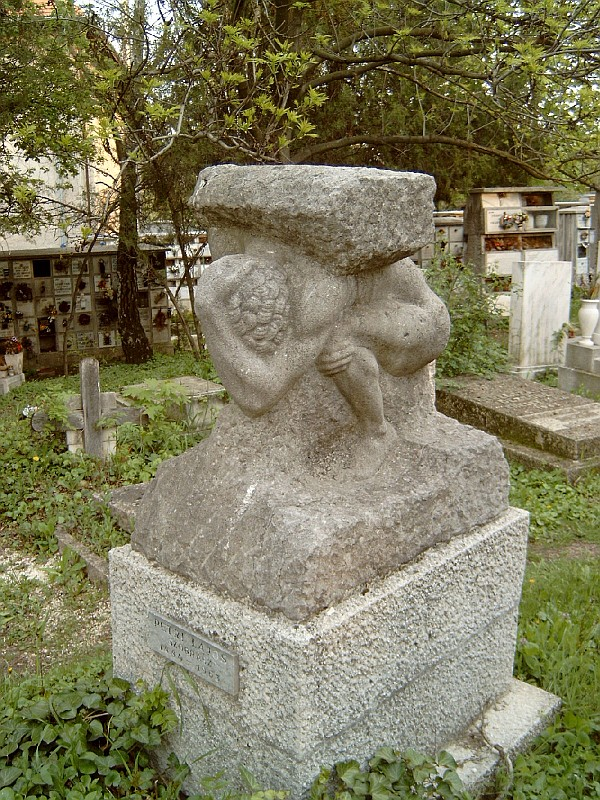
The tombstone of Lajos Petri in the Farkasrét Cemetery

Having passed the Matura examination, he started studying law in Budapest and began to take lectures on art history. He regularly attended the lectures of the art historian and art critic Gyula Pasteiner (1846 –1924); the philosopher, aesthete, translator and theatre critic Bernát Alexander (1850–1927); and literature historian Gusztáv Heinrich (1845–1922). During this period, he was more interested in athletics rather than in art. After having passed two basic exams (in German Rigorosum) in law, he continued his studies in Berlin. The German metropolis changed the young man's life. He attended the lectures of du Bois-Reymond and Heinrich Wölflin (1864–1945), the Swiss art historian. At the university library, he read a lot by Shakespeare, Leo Tolstoy and Anton Chekhov and he had the opportunity to visit international exhibitions, which decisively directed him towards art. He decided to become a sculptor. He returned home to announce his decision to his father, who would not share his enthusiasm. He was made to stay at his father's house. Two bitter years passed by, yet he promised his mother that he would not go against his father's will, and he finished his university studies. In May 1907 he obtained his degree at the faculty of law, yet already in the week of the graduation ceremony he left the family home and – with the recommendation of a remote relative of his – he met the sculptor Eduard Telcs (Ede Teltsch, 1872–1948). Telcs, who had studied at the Academy of Fine Arts Vienna accepted Pick as an apprentice. Pick's characteristic style developed during the two years that he spent at the atelier of Telcs, and he learnt a lot from him. As he writes: “He [Telcs] taught me to respect art, to despise the inferior devices meant for effect and to recognise the worthlessness of kitsch” – and he adds – “What I learnt from him is that the artist shall be honest regarding his emotions and trustworthy when he creates a piece of art. Besides these, it is indifferent what we will call conservatism or modernism or whatever movement. The question is how much an artist has got to say and to what extent he is able to express it”.

Petri moved to Belgium so that he could establish his own atelier in Brussels and so that he could introduce himself in an international milieu. In Brussels at the height of the history of Belgian sculpture, he himself influenced several artists. He made acquaintance with Jules Lagae (1862–1931) and Egide Rombeaux (1865–1942), who frequently visited him in his atelier. Later he described how his style changed in the following way:

"Looking at the sculptures of my earlier years, it is clear that it was the form that enjoyed priority to the disadvantage of the drama and emotionality. It was only the liberation of the later years that brought the perfection and completeness of emotionality, when the form of my sculptures started to bear only a secondary meaning. I recognised that due to the sophisticated elaboration, the strength of expression weakened, and I tended to lose my capability of making the dynamics of the sculpture perceptible and the spontaneity of the message was gone, yet spontaneity is the best device to achieve effect. The esprit of a message has an increased effect when we deliver it spontaneously" .

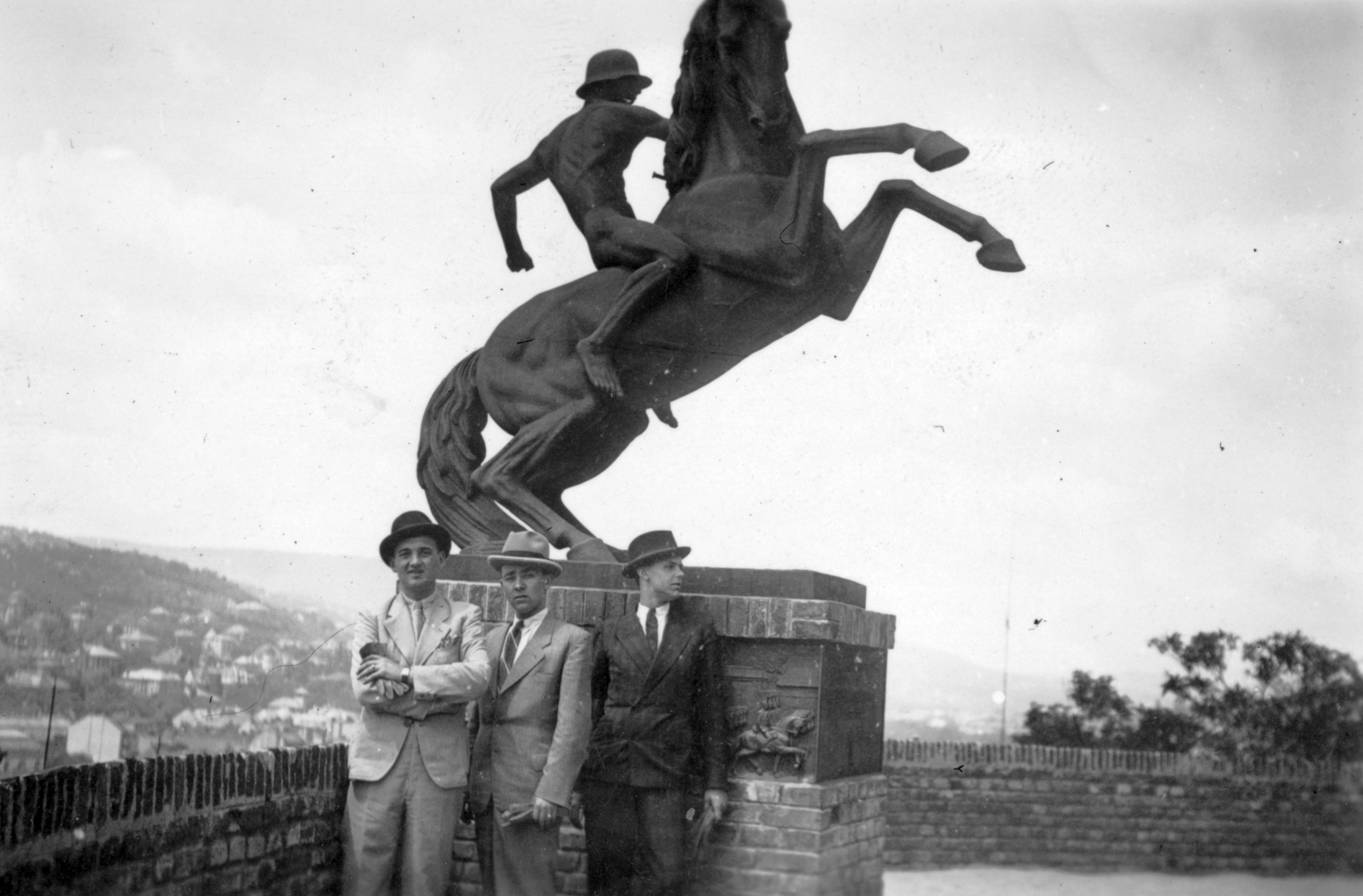
[https://www.kozterkep.hu/378#vetito=204276 A Fortepan photo taken of Lajos Petri's Monument to the 2nd Regiment of the Transylvanian Hussars erected in Buda Castle

He spent the following twelve years of his career in Belgium, where he was regarded as a significant sculptor famous for his portraits. His style of figurative sculpture started to evolve here. He made the following sculptures in Belgium: Runner at the starting line, Life and Dancing girl (1911) – the latter can be considered the most modern sculpture in its time.

World War I affected his career as well; it forced him, as many of his colleagues, to have a pause. Then in 1922, he participated in a group exhibition in Stockholm, which was followed by an individual exhibition in the Ernst Museum in Budapest. Although Lajos Petri had already become a successful sculptor at an international level by this time, he was not really accepted in his home country.

During the period between 1925–1940, almost his entire time was consumed by submitting his applications to calls announced by the state. This was a bitter epoch for him as his applications, which required plenty of months of work, were in most of the cases rejected by the political establishment.

The year 1935 brought the recognition that he had been longing for as he received the greatest order from the Hungarian state, a monumental statue, a hussar on horseback. In Hungary, this monument is considered one of the greatest examples of statues in classical style commemorating historical events. Following this, he received several orders from the state, yet World War II interrupted this new, successful period of his career. During the disasters of the war, one of his friends, Zoltán Kodály, the internationally acknowledged Hungarian composer and the president of the Hungarian Academy of Science, helped him survive the inhumane era. After the war, Kodály, who also played a leading role in rebuilding the cultural life in Hungary, supported Petri further on. Petri's spirit was not broken, and finally, after the war, he began to receive many orders from the state. He also proved to be very productive in other fields; he held lectures on art: The conflict of art and the public, The role of art criticism and beauty in the new art and The real face of Michelangelo. He also started to publish his studies: From clay to marble, Depicting sport in art and About Monumentality.

His reputation did not fade in Belgium; a long article was written about him in the Brussels literary magazine Le Musée du Soir, and he had the pleasure of having an exhibition once more in Brussels in 1959. His entire career was introduced at a comprehensive exhibition at the Nemzeti Szalon in Budapest in 1960 and then in the same year at the Hall of Art (in Hungarian Műcsarnok) in Budapest.

Petri about the portrait: “The similarity of the portrait to its model is a complex thing. The sculptor cannot create this similarity solely by observing the model in every detail. What the sculptor needs is understanding and affection, interest in the model and identifying himself/herself almost entirely to the model’s thoughts and emotions. Egocentric and condescending people, who lack these, will never create a good portrait; not even of those whom they love. This is why Michelangelo called the portrait, as such, the peak of all sorts of art. Furthermore, this is the reason why a certain connection will have developed between its creator and its model by the time the portrait is completed.

He argued that the beauty of the model should is not to be confused with the beauty of the sculpture, since a beautiful subject can yield kitsch and an unconventional one a masterpiece. This led to rejection to approaches drawn from fashion and cosmetics, holding that the greatest value lay in “intensifying all the characteristics of a face”.

At the end of his career, he returned to Szeged, his hometown situated on the riverbanks of the Tisza. Here he had a last exhibition at the Móra Ferenc Museum. He died at his atelier on 25 August 1963. He played an outstanding role in Hungarian and European sculpture. Today, Lajos Petri's sculptures are exhibited at the Hungarian National Gallery.

== Exhibitions ==
=== Individual exhibitions ===
- 1922: Ernst Museum, Budapest
- 1960: Nemzeti Szalon, Budapest
- 1960: Hall of Art, ‘Műcsarnok’ in Budapest
- 1963: in the city of Szeged (Hungary)

=== Selected works at group exhibitions ===
- 1922: Konstakademien, Ungerske Konstutställningen, Stockholm
- 1928: Hungarian Exhibition, Rome
- 1940: Spring Exhibition at the Hall of Art ‘Műcsarnok’, Budapest
- 1959: Exhibition in Brussels

== List of sculptures ==
The list below is based on the translation of the booklet Petri Lajos szobrászművész gyűjteményes kiállítása published by the Nemzeti Szalon in 1960 (p. 15–18). The booklet was published for the exhibition of Lajos Petri at the Műcsarnok in Budapest in 1960. The numbers are identical with the numbers in the booklet; however, not each and every statue and portrait of Petri is indicated. E.g. Petri's Monument to the 2nd Regiment of the Transylvanian Hussars is referred to on pages 10–11, yet it is not listed later among the 147 statues and portraits.

1. Zoltán Kodály (1908, plaster)

2. Bathing Girl, Fürdőző leány (1909, bronze)

3. Young Girl, Fiatal leány, „Mary” (1909, marble)

4. Portrait of Gyula Juhász (1883–1937), Hungarian poet (1909, stone, Szeged)

5. Nude figure, Akt (1910, plaster)

6. At the Starting Line, Startoló (1910, bronze)

7. Life, Élet (1912, plaster)

8. Miss G. W. (1912, plaster)

9. Melisande (1914, bronze)

10. Torso, Torzó (1914, bronze)

11. Dancing Girl, Táncoló lány (1911, bronze)

12. Portrait of Lajos Károlyi (1915, bronze)

13. Portrait of a young girl (1916, plaster)

14. Little Horseman (1917, plaster)

15. Portrait of Mrs Borsay (1917, marble)

16. Nun, Apáca (1918, marble)

17. Portrait of Margit Kaffka (1880–1918), Hungarian poet (1918, plaster)

18. Puci I. (1921, marble)

19. Desire, Vágy (1922, plaster)

20. Having Rest, Pihenő (1923, bronze)

21. Danae (1923, plaster)

22. Puci II. (1923, marble)

23. Puci III. (1923, plaster)

24. Sunrise, Napkelte (1925, plaster)

25. Sorrow, Bánat (1925, plaster)

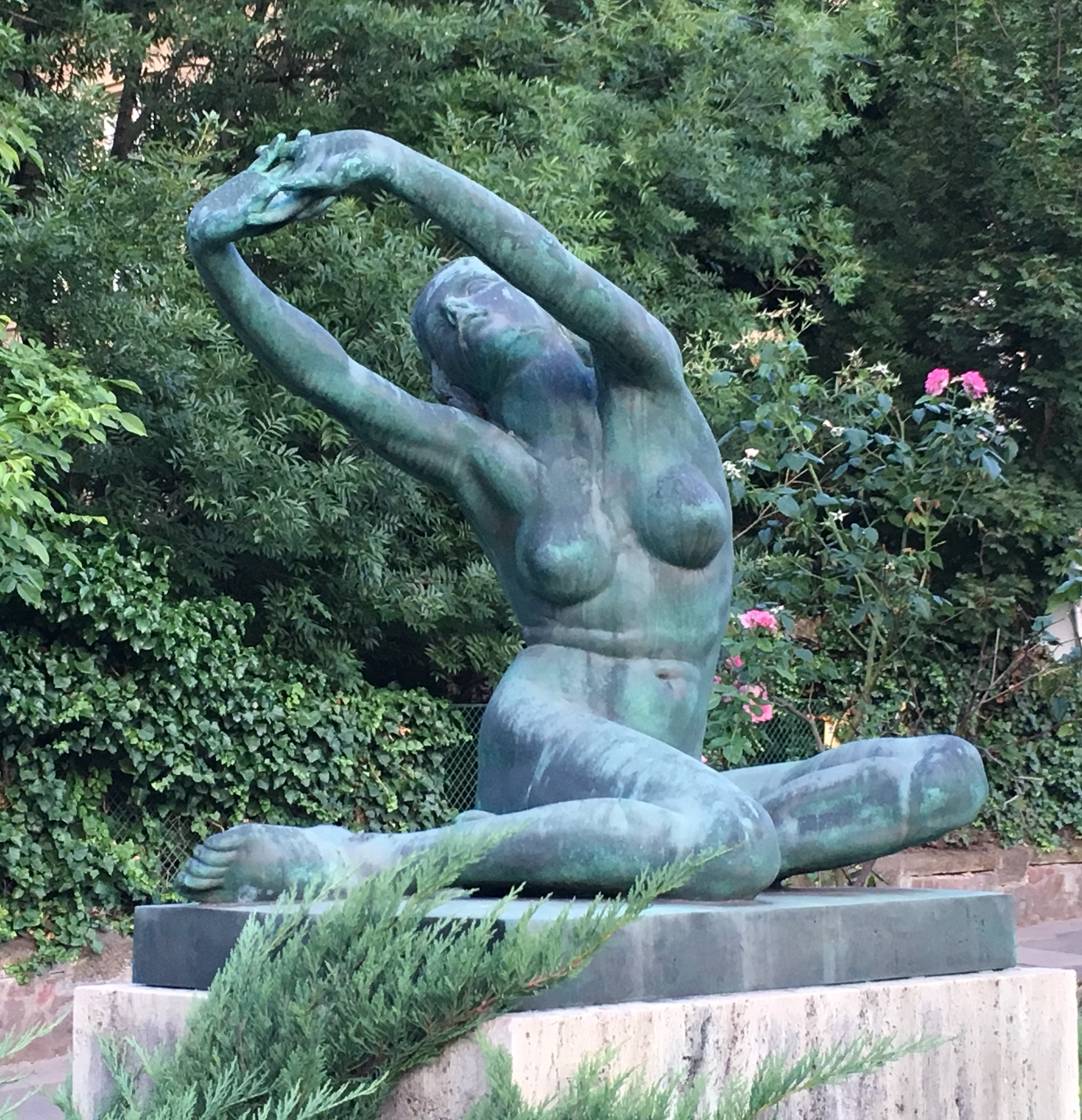
Awakening / Sorrow, Ébredés / Bánat (1937, bronze). [http://www.budapest-foto.hu/Ebredes-banat_szobor_3.htm Budapest, Hűvösvölgyi út 22-24.

26. Peasant Girl, Parasztlány (1926, marble)

27. Portrait of Éva Botond (1926, terracotta)

28. Portrait of Zdenka Ticharich (1927, bronze)

29. Zoltán Kodály II. (1927, bronze)

30. Girl Combing her Hair (1927, marble)

31. My Mother (1928, bronze)

32. Endre Ady (submitted to the call of Ady's tomb monument in 1928, plaster)

33. Student I. (1929, plaster)

34. Student II. (1929, plaster)

35. Kiss, Csók (1930, marble)

36. Peasant, Földművelő (1930, plaster)

37. Kató Jellencz (1931, marble)

38. Kató Jellencz (1931, plaster)

39. Draft submitted to the Lechner call (1931, plaster)

40. Wood carver, Kopjafafaragó (1931, terracotta)

41. Daysi Szijjas (1932, marble)

42. György Fráter (1933, bronze)

43. Dezső Szabó (1879–1945), Hungarian writer (1934, bronze)

44. Portrait of Aladár Tóth (1934, plaster)

45. Jacob and the Angel, Jákob és az angyal (1935, plaster)

46. Portrait of Györgyi Botond (1935, marble)

47. At the starting line (bigger version, 1935, plaster) Nagy startoló

48. Portrait of István Szőnyi (1894–1960), Hungarian painter (1936, plaster)

49. Portrait of Eugen Harthog (1937, plaster)

50. Portrait of Károly Kernstock (1873–1940), Hungarian painter (1937, plaster)

51. Submitted proposal for a tomb monument, Síremlékpályázat (1937, plaster)

52. Submitted proposal for Imre Madách's statue, szoborpályázat (1939, plaster)

53. Imre Madách (1823 –1864), Hungarian aristocrat, writer, poet, lawyer and politician (1939, terracotta)

54. Sorrow, Bánat (small version, 1940, plaster)

55. Nude figure (1940, terracotta)

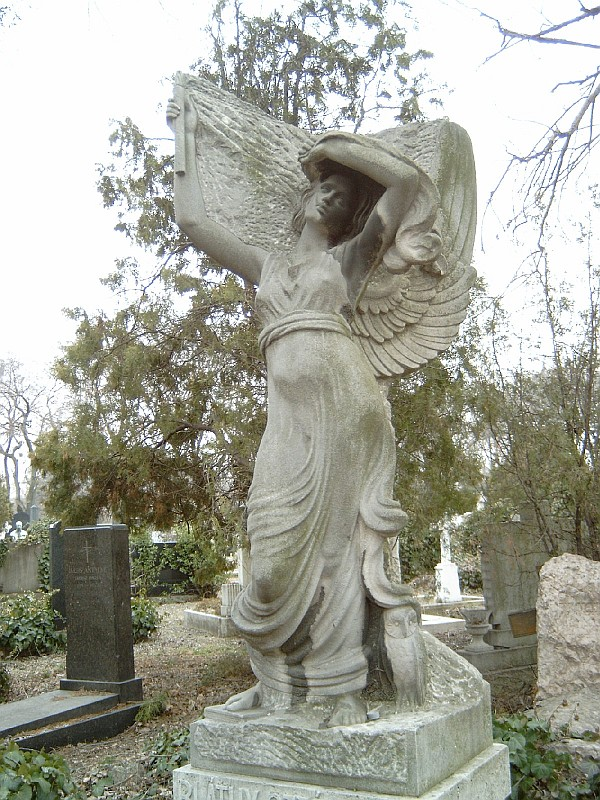
Tombstone of Ottó Bláthy

56. A draft for the tombstone of Otto Titusz Bláthy (1941, plaster)

57. A draft for the portrait of József Grősz (1942, plaster)

58. Portrait of Mrs. Langsfeld (1944, plaster)

59. Frederich van Salingen (1944, plaster)

60. Puci IV. (1944, plaster)

61. Portrait of Piroska Vörös (1945, plaster)

62. Ági Salacz (1945, artificial stone)

63. Sorrow, Szomorúság (1945, plaster)

64. Portrait of Árpád Szakasits (1945, plaster)

65. Portrait of Elza Simó (1945, plaster)

66. Portrait of Judith Mendelényi (1945, plaster)

67. Tukij (1945, artificial stone)

68. Portrait of Imre Ungár (1946, bronze)

69. Builders of the City, Városépítők (1946, plaster)

70. Gyula Juhász II. (1947, plaster)

71. Attila József (1905–1937), Hungarian poet(1947, plaster)

72. Water skiing girl, Vizijöringes leány (1947, plaster)

73. Draft for the portrait of Gyula Juhász (1883–1937), Hungarian poet (1947, plaster)

74. Mr. Gardner (1948, plaster)

75. Portrait of Ági Vantiny (1949, plaster)

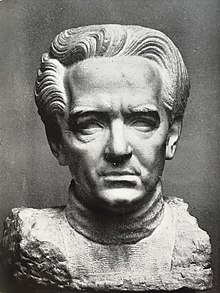
The portrait of Béla Balázs (1884–1949), Hungarian writer, poet, film critic and aesthete (1949, marble).

76. Portrait of Béla Balázs (1949, marble)

77. Sándor Petőfi (1950, marble)

78. Józsi Jenő Tersánszky (1950, marble)

80. Mrs. Balázs (1949, marble)

81. Olympic flame, Olimpiai láng (1950, plaster)

82. Skiing Girl, Síző leány (1950, plaster)

83. Relay Racing Girl, Női staféta (1950, plaster)
