= Fjellner =

Fjellner is a Swedish surname. Notable people with the surname include:

- Anders Fjellner (1795–1876), Sámi priest and poet
- Christofer Fjellner (born 1976), Swedish politician

== See also ==
- Fellner
