= Feulner =

Feulner (German pronunciation: [ˈfɔʏlnɐ]) is a German surname. Notable people with the surname include:

- Edwin Feulner (1941–2025), American political scientist
- Markus Feulner (born 1982), German footballer

== See also ==
- Fellner
