= Pólus Palace Golf Club =

Coordinates: 47°41′34.47″N 19°8′39.84″E

- Interactive map of Pólus Palace Golf Club

Club information
- Location: Göd, Hungary
- Established: 2005
- Type: private
- Owner: Péter Pólus
- Tota holes: 18
- Tournaments: Pólus Palace Masters Cup
- Website: poluspalace.hu/en/golf
- Par: 72
- Length: 6208 yd

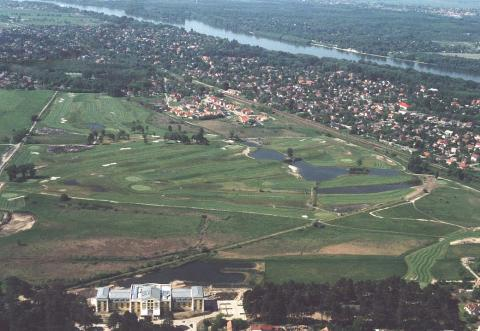
Pólus Palace Golf Club

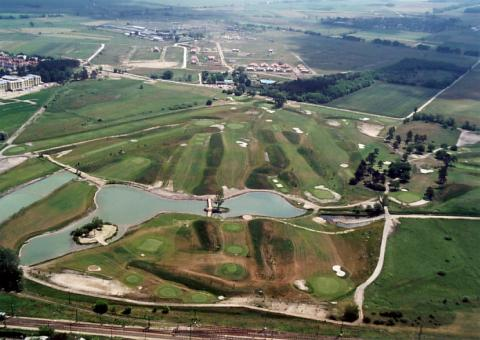
Pólus Palace Golf Club

Pólus Palace Golf Club was a golf course in Hungary. It was built by Péter Pólus, a Hungarian entrepreneur. It is privately owned.

The course is situated on a 178 acres (0.28 sq mi; 0.72 km^{2}), protected nature reserve, with a driving range with 16 sheltered stands and both pitching and putting greens, Polus Palace calls itself a "golf hotel". It hosted the Polus Palace Masters Cup golf tournament, sponsored by Chevrolet in 2005. The course also supports practising. The 6,208 yards (5,677 m) course has a day and night driving range with professional golfers offering instructions. A series of tournaments are being held from early spring till fall.

Registered players of the Club sometimes participate on charity golf events.
