= Ö. Fülöp Beck =

Hungarian sculptor

Ö. Fülöp Beck (Hungarian: Beck Ödön Fülöp, Beck Ötvös Fülöp, or Beck Ö. Fülöp, Hebrew: פולפ אדן (אטווש) בק; 1873, Pápa (Yiddish: פּופּאַ, פּופּע, Hebrew: פּוּפֶּא, פּאפּא, German: Poppa), Veszprém Co, Royal Hungary, Imp. & R. Austria – 1945, went missing in Budapest) was a Hungarian sculptor noted for his medal sculptures of Endre Ady, Sándor Petőfi, Ferenc Liszt, Mihály Babits and Kelemen Mikes creating over 500 in his career. Later in his career he created notable busts of Zoltán Kodály and Zsigmond Móricz and various tombs and developed a Post-Impressionism style influenced by elements of Art Nouveau.

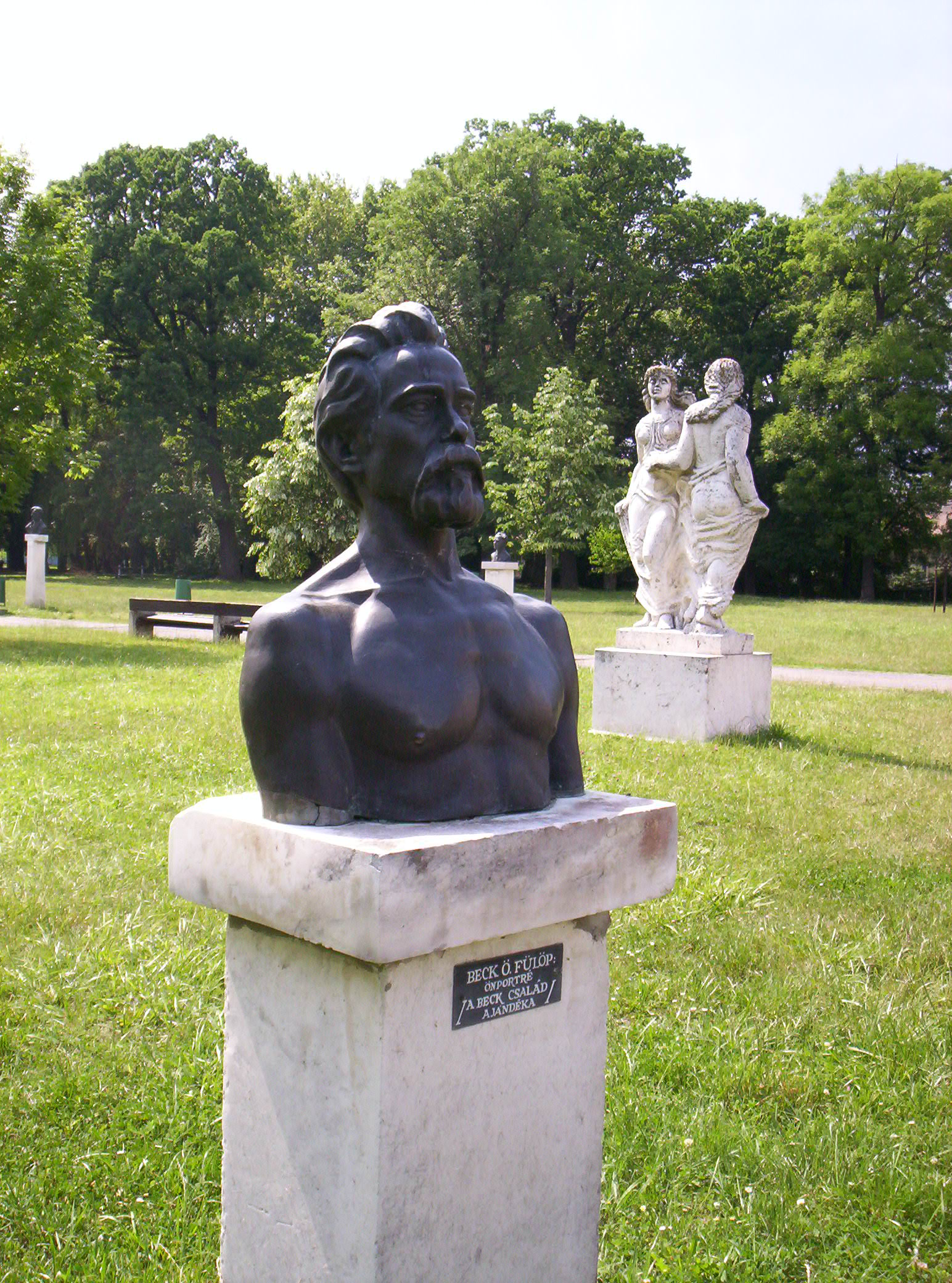
Self-portrait bust in his birthplace of Pápa

== Biography ==
Beck was born in a family of Jewish parents Pál Beck and Ernesztin Gold in Pápa, in 1873. In 1888 he studied at the School of Applied Arts in Budapest until 1893 when he after visiting Vienna travelled to Paris the following year. In Paris he participated in a competition which was to create the medal of the Millennium Exhibition. He won while he was the pupil of Ponscarme at the École des Beaux-Arts in Paris in 1895. In 1898 exhibition he exhibited his medals at the Museum of Industrial Design, the first year than medals had been showcased, later winning a silver medal at the World Exhibition in Paris in 1900. He spent a number of years in Germany and in Italy where he won the Grand Prix in Milan in 1906.

In Milan who grew interested in creating statues and moved back to his country, opening up a workshop in Göd. His earlier works include Animal Reliefs in 1911, Saint Sebastian in 1914, and Aphrodite in 1915 and was contracted to sculpturally decorate the Corvin department store in Budapest in 1916.

In 1928 he began working on tombs and memorials creating the Tomb of Baumgarten and Fellner's tomb in 1932, the Liszt Memorial in 1935 and the Kölcsey Memorial, and Iron Founders in 1943).

He died probably in Spring of 1945.

== See also ==
- András Beck (1911, Alsógöd, Göd–1985, Clamart), His son, a sculptor, medalist and college professor
- Vilmos Fémes Beck (1885, Budapest–1918, Budapest), a goldsmith, medalist and sculptor
- Judit Beck (1909, Budapest–1995, Budapest), His daughter, a painter, graphic artist, ceramic artist, textile- and puppet designer. The lovers of Miklós Radnóti, music- and art historian György Gombosi, né Georg Gruber (1904–1945, KZ Groß-Rosen), and wife of Tamás Major
