= Göd =

Small city in Pest County, Hungary

- Town
- Flag Coat of arms

- Location of Göd in Hungary
- Coordinates: 47.69397°N 19.14233°E
- Country: Hungary
- Region: Central Hungary
- County: Pest
- Subregion: Dunakeszi
- Rank: City

Area
  - Total: 22.84 km^{2} (8.82 sq mi)

Population (2017)
  - Total: 18,625
  - Density: 815.5/km^{2} (2,112/sq mi)
- Time zone: UTC+1 (CET)
  - Summer (DST): UTC+2 (CEST)
- Postal code: 2131
- Area code: +36 27
- KSH code: 23649
- Website: god.hu

Göd (Hungarian pronunciation: [ˈɡød]) is a small city in Pest County, Hungary. The city is northeast of Budapest.

== Economy ==
Göd has a thriving tourist trade. It has a thermal spa open almost 365 days a year with water rich in minerals. Along the M2 motorway Göd is the second town to the north of Budapest, and the first one without large socialist-era housing estates. That is, the green belt around Budapest starts with Göd on the left bank of the Danube.

The Samsung SDI Hungary plant is one of Samsung SDI's trio of advanced Lithium-ion automotive battery production facilities: the others are in Ulsan (Korea) and Xi'an. The plant at Göd is not far from the Austria-based battery pack division of Magna Steyr which was acquired by Samsung SDI in 2015 for $120 million. In 2016-2017, the Ulsan plant trained several employees for the Hungary plant. The Ulsan plant had supplied the BMW i3, but the Hungary plant will provide the BMW i3, i5, and X5 with advanced Li-ion batteries.

In February 2026, the Hungarian news outlet Telex reported that carcinogenic substances had been detected at more than 500 times the permitted level at the Samsung SDI plant, and alleged that the company failed to address or disclose the issue. According to Agence France-Presse (AFP), the allegations became public following the leak of a government surveillance report involving the monitoring of Samsung's local executives. Critics cited by Telex and AFP argued that the Hungarian government was reluctant to take measures such as temporarily closing the plant due to potential economic and political consequences. On the 11th, the Supreme Court of Hungary overturned a lower court's revocation of the plant's environmental certification.

== Infrastructure ==
Göd is connected to Budapest (via Dunakeszi, southbound) and to Vác (via Sződliget, northbound) by railway and public roads. On an average weekday, there are buses and trains every 30 minutes to both directions. Vác is 15 minutes by car and by train, and 25 minutes by bus. Budapest Nyugati railway station is 30 minutes by train. Because of these benefits, Göd is sometimes categorized as a dormitory town, but it has a vivid social life: civil organizations, churches, galleries, clubs, a monthly newspaper, that make it different from an average dormitory town.

== Gallery ==
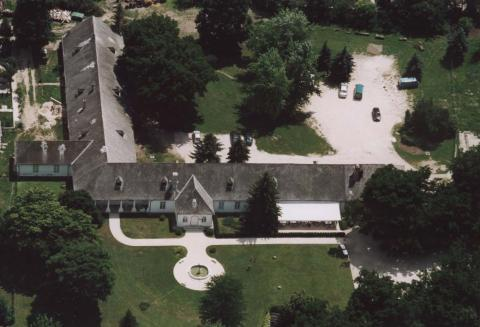

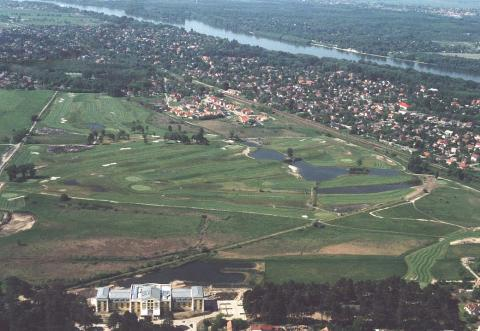

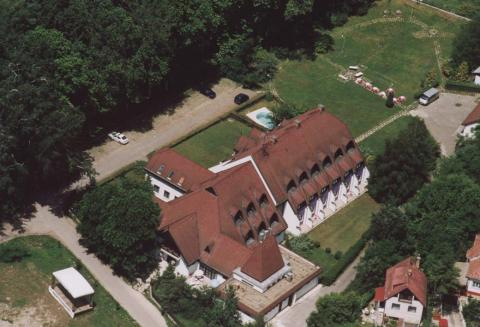

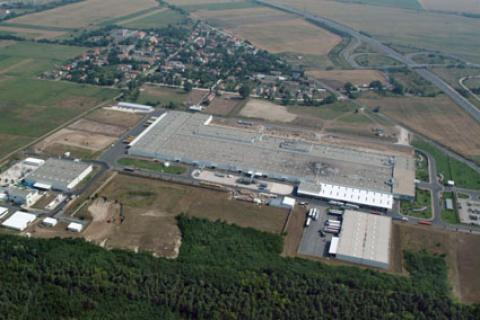

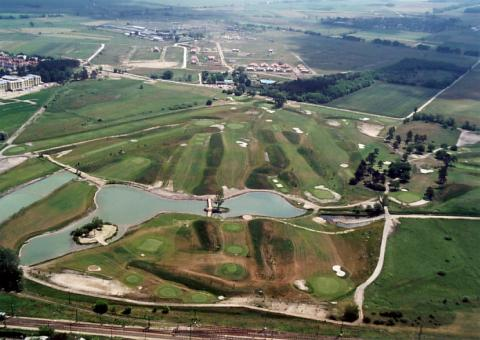

== Famous people ==
- Eugene Wigner – physicist and Nobel-prize winner
- Tivadar Huzella – biologist, cancer researcher, and founder of the Biology Research Centre of Göd
- Fülöp Beck Ö – sculptor
- Gabriella Lakatos – ballet-dancer
- Kálmán Latabár – actor
- Mór Kóczán – sportsman, athlete (javelin throw), Olympic bronze medalist, and Hungarian champion
- Zoltán Kammerer – sportsman (kayak), World Champion, European Champion, and Olympic Gold winner
- Colonel Miklós Kiss – hero of the Hungarian Revolution of 1848
- Gábor Koncz – actor
- László Arany – poet (son of János Arany)

== Twin towns – sister cities ==
Göd is twinned with:

- Marignane, France
- Monthey, Switzerland
- Paleu, Romania
- Yanoshi, Ukraine

== Sport ==
The local sports and football team is Gödi SE.
