= Tamás Portik =

Hungarian billionaire criminal (born 1967)

- Born: Tamás Horváth; December 14, 1967 (age 58); Celldömölk, Hungary
- Other names: Mindenki, Csontváry
- Organization: Energol Rt.
- Political party: MSZP
- Criminal charges: Incitement to murder
- Criminal penalty: 15 + 13 years
- Spouse: Marianne Pápai
- Partner: Alma Halmos-Riskó
- Children: 4

Tamás Portik (born 14 December 1967) is a billionaire Hungarian criminal, one of the key players in the oil mafia scandals of the 1990s. He was arrested by the police in 2012. In April 2013, the Portik-Laborc case, a political scandal, broke out. In the Prisztás murder case, the Metropolitan Court of Appeal sentenced Portik to 15 years in prison on 26 May 2016 for abetting manslaughter. In 2017, the court handed down a new final judgment in the Fenyő murder case, sentencing him to 13 years imprisonment.

== His life ==
Tamás Portik - born Tamás Horvát - was raised in a foster home. He later spent years in juvenile detention. His wife was Erika Kecskeméti, from whom he married. Tamás Portik. His former partner was Alma Halmos-Riskó - the mother of his four children - whom Portik courted with a hundred roses. Portik was a pimp after years in a juvenile prison and worked as a prostitute sponsor. He then became a bouncer in the nightlife of Budapest, a job his previous boxing experience made him well suited for. At work he met Gábor Drobilich, a well-known figure in the underworld of the time. His career as a businessman can be dated from there, and when he met Attila Ferencsik with Drobilich's help, the three of them started "oiling". In the 1990s, "oiling" was one of the main sources of income for organised crime in Hungary, the easiest way to raise capital after the regime change. In 1994, Tamás Portik participated in the founding of the Energol oil trading company. Energol Rt. was founded on 30 November 1994 by Gábor Drobilich, Attila Ferencsik, István Kerekes, Tamás Portik, Emil Gulyás, a German citizen, and his son, Emil Róbert Gulyás. The directors of the company were Gábor Drobilich, Attila Ferencsik and Tamás Portik.

Gábor Drobilich and Attila Ferencsik, the founders of Energol Rt., previously spent years in prison. Energol Rt. played a significant role in the oil exploration and production cases of the 1990s. Oil exploration was one of the most lucrative illegal activities in post-regime Hungary, estimated to have saved the Hungarian state hundreds of billions of forints in the 1990s. This activity made a significant difference to Portik's financial situation. In addition to discos, nightclubs and real estate speculation, Portik also wanted to exploit the opportunities offered by Internet trading. An investigation was launched in 1996 and an arrest warrant was issued in 1997, but by then Portik had "retired into illegality." In 2001, the Centre for the Coordination of Organised Crime (CCOC) was set up to carry out an analysis of Tamás Portik, but the material was shelved between 2002 and 2010.

Tibor Riskó's complaint to Ferenc Gyurcsány in December 2005

„The story is about a family of 21 who lived in love, happiness and honour. For the last two years, this family included my granddaughter, Alma Halmos-Riskó, and her four children. Unfortunately, the last ten years of our lives were dominated by the children's biological father, Tamás Portik, who we later found out was the most dangerous criminal wanted in Hungary and abroad for eight years, who became notorious in the Energol case (...). Tamás Portik regularly threatens, sometimes threatens the life of members of our family, keeps them under psychological terror, blackmails them, because we refused to help him in his illegal actions.”

In 2003, he asked Tamás Gyárfás, then a producer of Nap TV, to help him return home legally, and the police subsequently removed Portik from the wanted list, who returned as an entrepreneur. According to his mother Judit Riskó, Portik had completely transformed the personality of her daughter, who had four children by 2004. Portik had given birth to four children by 2004, and according to her mother Judit Riskó, Portik had completely transformed the personality of her daughter. Her grandmother's contact with her grandchildren has also become impossible. She currently uses an internet diary to send messages to her grandchildren.

Portik was finally arrested in 2012 in his Buda villa, which he had exchanged with media entrepreneur Tamás Gyárfás in August 1999. Portik owned the valuable house with his partner, Alma Halmos-Riskó.

In addition to the statute of limitations, Portik was charged with the 1996 murder of József Prisztás, the 1997 attempted assassination of entrepreneur Zoltán Seres, the 1998 murder of media entrepreneur János Fenyő, and the 1998 bombing of Aranykéz Street. Tamás Portik gave the order to kill Prisztás, was lured to the scene by his acquaintance Ferenc Fazekas, and shot in the head by Portik's bodyguard István Hatvani. Prisztás's mother said that before she died, she wanted to look into the eyes of the man who had her child killed. In the Prisztás murder case, the Metropolitan Court of Budapest sentenced him to 11 years in prison in the first instance on 10 February 2014. In October 2015, in the repeated first instance proceedings, the Metropolitan Court of Budapest sentenced Tamás Portik, accused of being an instigator of the crime, to 10 years in prison without final judgment. In May 2016, the Metropolitan Court of Appeal sentenced Portik to fifteen years imprisonment, aggravating the sentence imposed at first instance.

In 2012, Judit Riskó interviewed her son-in-law in a report on Hír television. In April 2013, the Laborc case broke out. Sándor Pintér, Minister of the Interior, declassified some wiretap transcripts which revealed that Sándor Laborc, the former head of the Hungarian secret service, and Tamás Portik had met at least twice in 2008. According to the transcripts, Portik said that "I am still doing well on the left and I will do everything within the legal framework to keep it that way in 2010."

In 2014, according to reports published on the atlatszo.hu portal, Portik's alleged partner, "the Fidesz think tank." Marianne Pápa is a businesswoman, Ferenc Szetlik is an entrepreneur (uncle of Árpád Habony) and the widow of opera singer József Kovács. However, Marianne Pápa denied this claim in a statement. "I, Marianne Pápa, hereby declare that I have not been and am not in a civil partnership with Tamás Portik, neither in the past nor at present, and that I have not been and am not in any business relationship with Tamás Portik."

In May 2017, the Budapest Court of Appeal announced a verdict in the Fenyő murder case, which resulted in the final sentences of life imprisonment for Jozef Rohác and thirteen years for Tamás Portik. The judge accused Judit Riskó, the grandmother of Tamás Portik's children, of bias and hatred. In the summer of 2017, the prison cell of the oil criminal, who was sentenced to 13 years for the murder of Tamás Boros and 15 years for the shooting of József Prisztás, was searched on false charges and documents were seized.

In January 2019, it was revealed that Tamás Portik's partner, Judit Riskó's daughter, had given István Dósa the audio recordings from which Tamás Gyárfás was first blackmailed a few months later. The Gyárfás-Portik investigation revealed 32 bags of evidence and audio from Tamás Portik's past to the police. According to the police, the crime scenes and audio recordings found in the Farkasréti cemetery may provide answers to the key events of organised crime in the 1990s and 2000s. According to several sources, one of Portik's "money managers" was András István Dósa, the first head of the charity branch of the MSZP. In an article published on the index.hu news portal on 24 January 2019, journalist András Dezső summarised many of the facts and myths surrounding the Portik case. According to him, the use of the found audio recordings is essentially up to the police leadership. Subsequently, police transcripts of the conversation between Portik and Gyárfás, which contain their conversations recorded in the 2000s, were published on the index.hu portal. The newspaper states in its article, which includes detailed information, that Gyárfás "enjoyed the company of the quick-witted man."

== Movie ==
The creators of the 2008 Hungarian comedy film Kaméleon expressed their special thanks to Tamás Portik, whose name appears after the credits, as one scene of the film was shot in a downtown café that belonged to his interests. It has been suggested that the film is actually about Tamás Portik and his former partner Alma Halmos-Riskó. This was always denied by the director Krisztina Goda (screenwriter Réka Divinyi), but the Halmos-Riskó family saw too many similarities in the film. According to them, practically all the characters and the story are identical to what happened in reality. András Vajna, the film producer and government commissioner responsible for the renewal of the Hungarian film industry, accused Portik of lying. According to Gábor Kálomista, "Portik made handwritten notes in the book to make the scenes more authentic. It turned out that several locations where we wanted to shoot belonged to him. He wanted to help us with that, which we accepted. There were times when we couldn't arrange roadblocks, but his guy made a phone call and a few minutes later there were police officers standing there in a huff."

== In culture ==
- Jozef Roháč is featured in the 1994 textbook Násilí (Violence) compiled by known Slovak sociologist and former VPN chairman Fedor Gál with other authors. One chapter is essentially a transcription of tape records of an interview conducted by Gál with Roháč probably in early 1993.
- A book Jozef Roháč – štvrťstoročie na úteku (Jozef Roháč – quarter-century on the run) by Slovak journalist Martin Mózer was published in 2010. The book has 328 pages and is written in Slovak.

== Further information ==
- Parliamentary documents, parliament.hu
- The Laborc-Portik affair: "The dung heap that has emerged here is thanks to the comrades", mno.hu
- Life of the Portik family, mno.hu
- Are the police also investigating Tamás Portik's wealth?, hvg.hu
- The police officers working on the Golden Hands Street case were threatened with their lives , nol.hu
- Olaj-ügy, kmonitor.hu
- He would have trampled you like shit!, index.hu.
- Németh Krisztina: The Rohác-Portik case. Pros and cons (2016)

== See also ==
- Crime in Hungary
- Nemzetbiztonsági Hivatal
