= András Beck =

Hungarian sculptor

Beck in 1969 with his famous Masque de Saint-John Perse

András Beck (1911–1985) was a Hungarian sculptor. He was noted for his symbolic and expressionist bronze statuettes and portrait busts.

His 3.5-metre-tall statue commemorating the death of Jan Palach was transported from France to the Czech Republic to be installed in Mělník, the city of studies of Jan Palach, on the occasion of the 40th anniversary of his death.

== Early life ==
Beck was born in Alsógöd in 1911. His father, artist Ödön Fülöp Beck, trained him from a young age, and he later became a pupil of Zsigmond Kisfaludi Strobl at the Hungarian Art School for three years, where his talent began to flourish. He left on a study trip to Berlin and then London, where his early works were exhibited.

== Career ==
From the 1930s he became well known for his expressionist sculpture, creating plaquettes of Árpád Tóth, Bartók, Móricz, and Thomas Mann. Between 1945 and 1955 he was hired to sculpt figures for display in various towns and cities. Settling permanently in Paris in 1956, in 1963 his lyrical works were exhibited at the Galerie Lambert.

In 1947 Beck was appointed the president of the Trade Union of Hungarian Artists, subsequently leaving for Paris, where in 1948 he became teacher of the Art School. During this tenure there he designed the Leonardo da Vinci Medal.

In the late 1960s he created Refugees (1967) and Dance (1969) and his famous Masque de Saint-John Perse bronze mask of writer Saint-John Perse.

By the late 1970s he was employed at the Mint in Paris, where a number of his works were exhibited but retired from active sculpture creation in 1980.

== Death ==
Beck died in Paris in 1985 in a car accident.
