= Ferenc Medgyessy =

Hungarian sculptor and physician

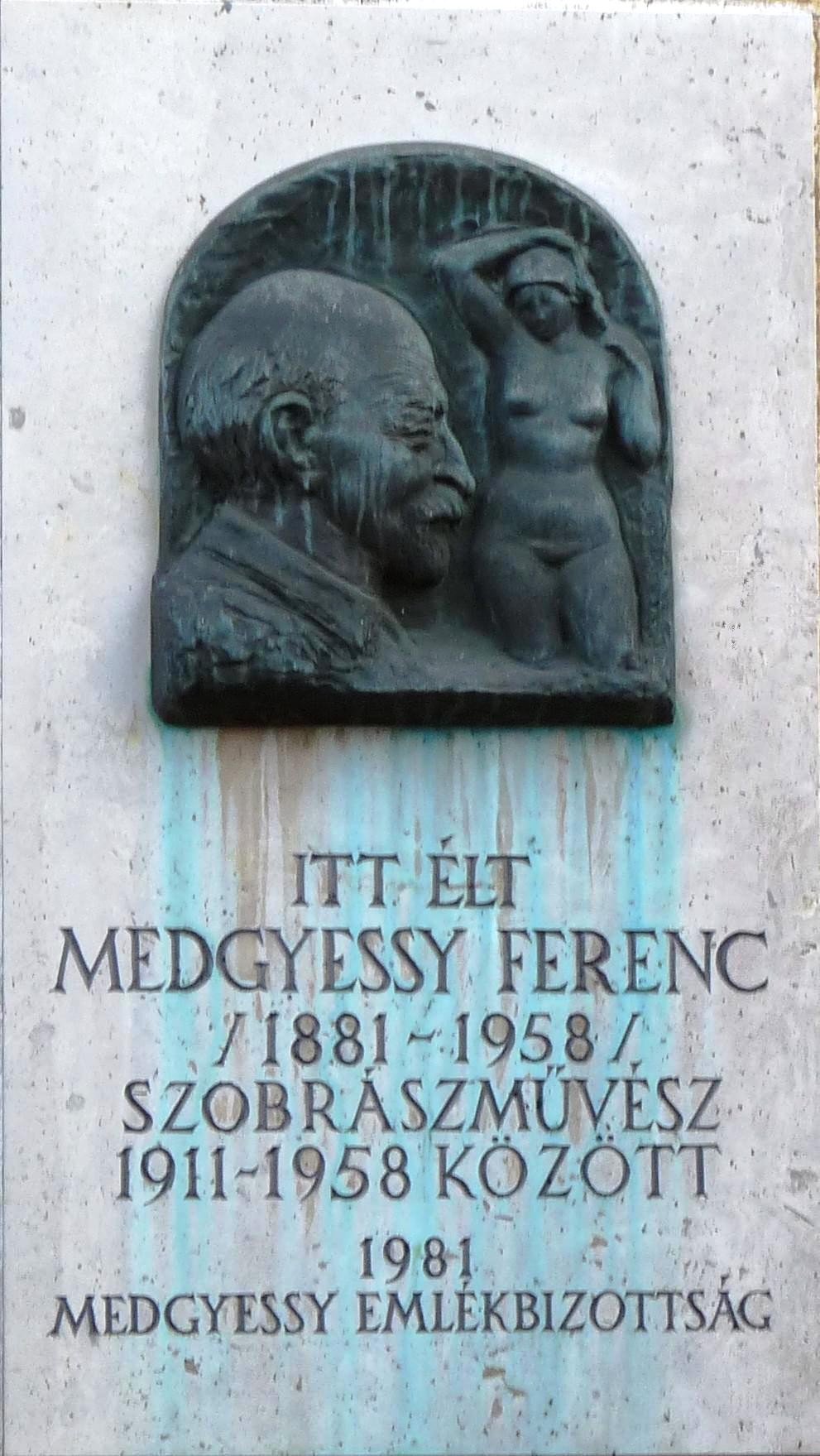
- Commemorative plaque to Mr. Ferenc Medgyessy (1881–1958) Hungarian sculptor and professor. It is affixed on a studio house of the artists’ colony of the Százados Street in Budapest where he lived and worked between 1911 and 1958. Author of the bronz relief is Mr. Iván Szabó. (Budapest, District VIII, Százados Street Nr 8).
- Born: 1881; Debrecen, Hungary
- Died: 1958 (aged 76–77); Budapest, Hungary
- Style: Folk realism

Ferenc Medgyessy (1881 in Debrecen, Hungary – 1958 in Budapest, Hungary) was a Hungarian sculptor and physician. After graduating in medicine he studied art in Paris. Later, he studied Michelangelo and the Etruscan art in Florence. His art was dominated by folk realism.

He was regarded as one of the significant innovators of 20th century Hungarian sculpture, drawing inspiration from classical antiquity as well as French sculptors such as Aristide Maillol and Charles Despiau. His work often emphasized the human figure, themes of labor, and the representation of everyday life, reflecting both social realism and a strong connection to Hungarian national identity.

In 1948 and 1957 he won the Kossuth Prize.
