= Zdenka Ticharich =

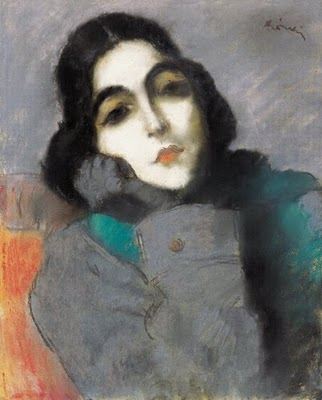
- Portrait of Ticharich by Jozsef Rippl-Ronai (1921)

Background information
- Born: Zdenka von Ticharich; September 26, 1900; Budapest
- Died: February 15, 1979 (aged 78) Budapest
- Occupations: pianist, composer, and music instructor
- Instruments: piano

Zdenka Ticharich (Zdenka von Ticharich) (26 September 1900 – 15 February 1979) was a Hungarian pianist, music educator and composer.

== Life ==
Zdenka Ticharich was born in Budapest. She studied with István Tomka at the National School of Music, and then with Ferruccio Busoni and Emil Sauer at the Berlin University of the Arts, and composition with Franz Schreker from 1923 to 1925. On March 11, 1929, Ticharich made her American debut at The Town Hall (New York City). Young composers from Schreker's class were popular in concert halls and opera houses in Germany but were forced into exile and their music banned by the Third Reich prior to World War II. From 1947-1969 Ticharich taught piano at the Budapest Academy of Music. She died in Budapest in 1979.

Capriccio by Berthold Goldschmidt (1903–1996) was composed for Ticharich in 1927. She was a popular subject for artist portraits:

- Woman with Lace Ödön Márffy (1878–1959), 1930
- Zdenka Ticharich and Csinszka Ödön Márffy, 1930
- Portrait of Ticharich Zdenka József Rippl-Rónai (1861–1927), 1921

== Works ==
Ticharich composed for voice, orchestra and solo piano. Selected works include:

- Suite for Piano (1928)
1. Praeludium
2. Scherzo-Valse
3. Notturno
4. Finale

Ticharich's compositions have been recorded and issued on CD, including:

- Franz Schreker's Masterclasses in Vienna and Berlin, Vol. 3, Kolja Lessing piano, EDA Records (2007)
