= Eduard Telcs =

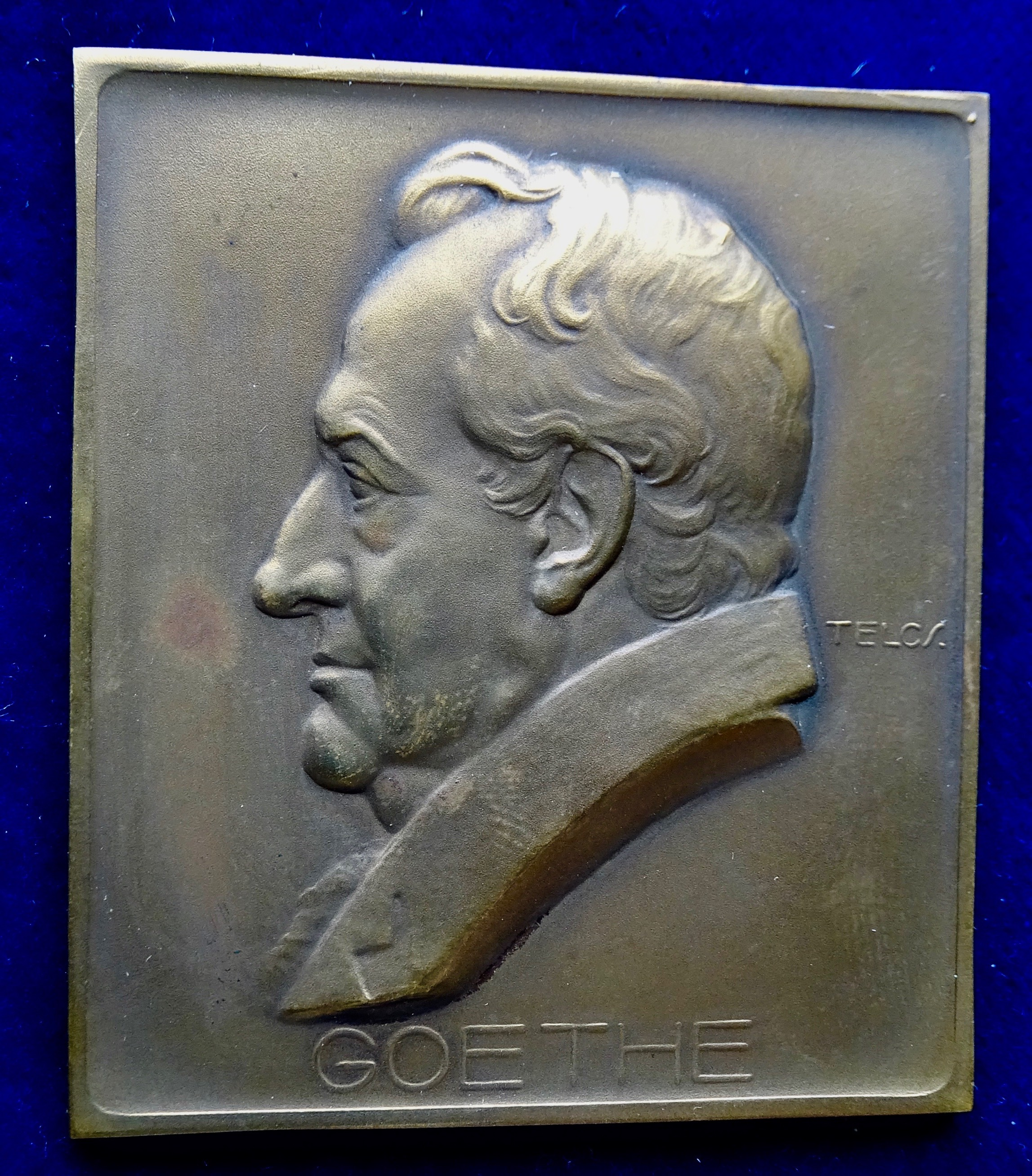
Netherlands, 1924 ND Ede Telcs' Plaque Medal Johann Wolfgang von Goethe

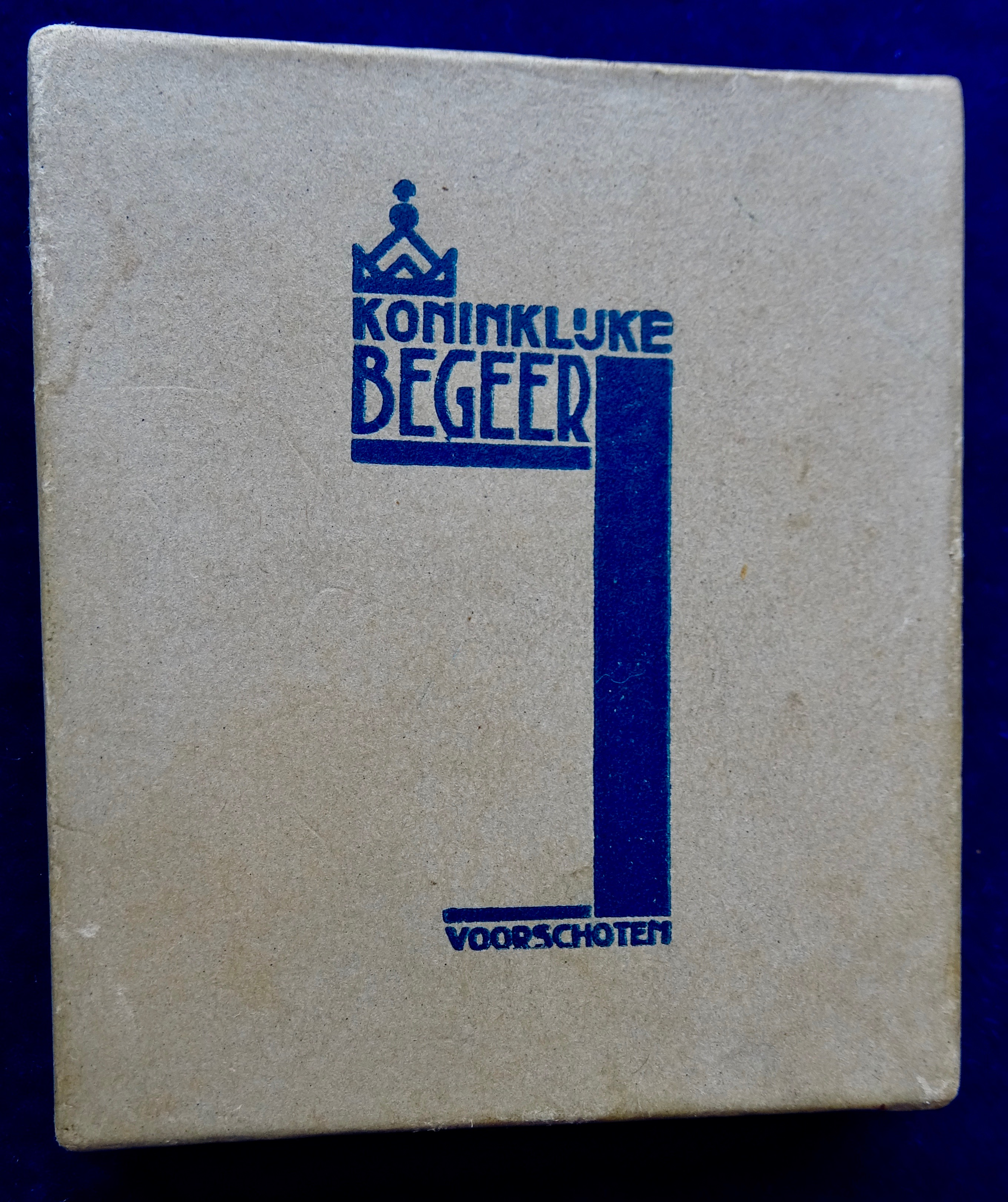
Art Deco box for Telcs' Goethe medal. Ede Telcs was Art Director during his time in The Netherlands from 1920 to 1924 at Koninklijke Nederlandsche Edelmetaal Bedrijven Van Kempen, Begeer en Vos, the editor of this plaque medal.

Eduard "Ede" Telcs was a Hungarian sculptor, and medallist; born at Baja, Hungary on 12 May 1872; died 1948 in Budapest. At the age of twelve he went to Budapest and studied decorative art, but he soon left that city for Vienna, where he was educated for four years in the Allgemeine Bildhauerschule, winning the Füger gold medal with his "St. Boniface Striking Down the Banner of Wotan." He next entered Professor Zumbusch's school, where he studied for three years, gaining the school's first prize with his "Two Drinkers," which 1894 won a medal of the second class at the World's Fair in Antwerp. Telcs attracted particular attention in 1900 by being awarded, for his monument in honor of Empress Elizabeth of Austria, first prize among many competitors. In 1905 he was commissioned to work on a statue of the poet Vörösmarty to be erected in Budapest, and another of Kossuth in Kecskemét, having been awarded both these commissions as a result of competition.

In World War II Budapest 1944 Telcs was ordered to wear the Jewish badge (Judenstern). Raoul Wallenberg helped to prevent his deportation into a Nazi extermination camp.

On 19 September 2008 on the 60th anniversary of his death a memorial was held in Baja at the house where he was born. Wreaths laid by the mayor and the member of parliament for the region. A special exposition was also opened on the same day at the museum. Telcs family members from all over the world gathered for this occasion.
