= József Rippl-Rónai =

Hungarian painter (1861–1927)

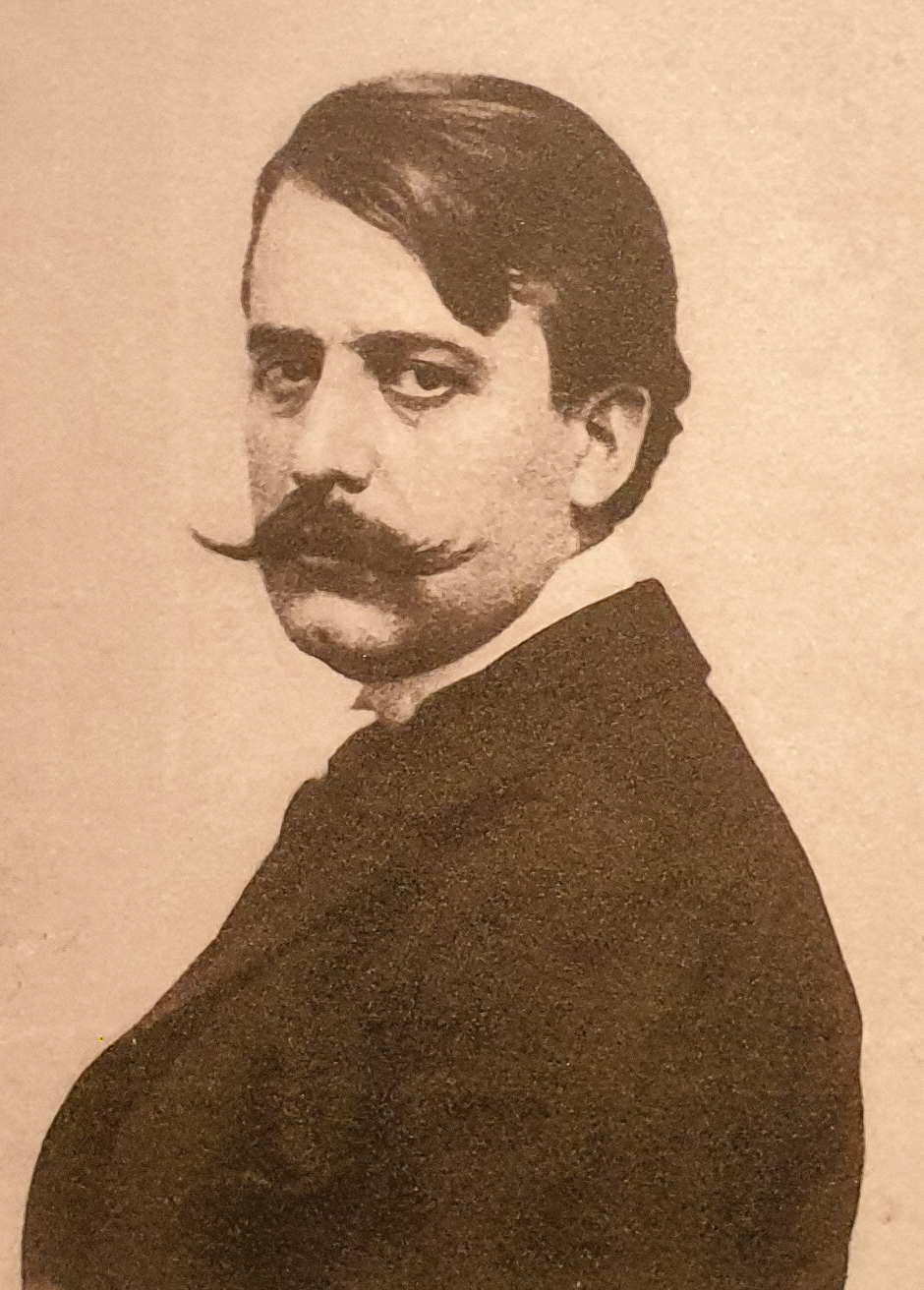
- József Rippl-Rónai in 1902
- Born: 23 May 1861; Kaposvár, Kingdom of Hungary, Austrian Empire
- Died: 25 November 1927 (aged 66); Kaposvár, Hungary
- Occupation: Painter

József Rippl-Rónai (23 May 1861 – 25 November 1927) was a Hungarian painter. He was among the first Hungarian exponents of artistic modernism.

== Biography ==
He was born in Kaposvár. After his studies at the high school there, he went to study in Budapest, where he obtained a degree in pharmacology. In 1884, he traveled to Munich to study painting at the Akademie der Bildenden Künste. Two years later, he obtained a grant which enabled him to move to Paris and study with Mihály Munkácsy, the most important Hungarian realist painter. In 1888, he met the members of Les Nabis and under their influence he painted his first important work, The Inn at Pont-Aven, notable for its dark atmosphere. His first big success was his painting My Grandmother (1894). He also painted a portrait of Hungarian pianist and composer Zdenka Ticharich (1921).

Later, he returned to Hungary, where critical reception was at first lukewarm, but he eventually had a successful exhibition entitled "Rippl-Rónai Impressions 1890-1900". He believed that, for an artist, not only is his body of work significant, but also his general modus vivendi, even including the clothes he wore. He thus became interested in design, which led to commissions such as the dining room and the entire furnishings of the Andrássy palace, and a stained-glass window in the Ernst Museum, (both in Budapest). Between 1911 and 1913, his exhibitions in Frankfurt, Munich, and Vienna were highly successful. His last major work, a portrait of his friend Zorka, was painted in 1919, and in 1927, he died at his home, the Villa Róma in Kaposvár.

== Selected paintings ==
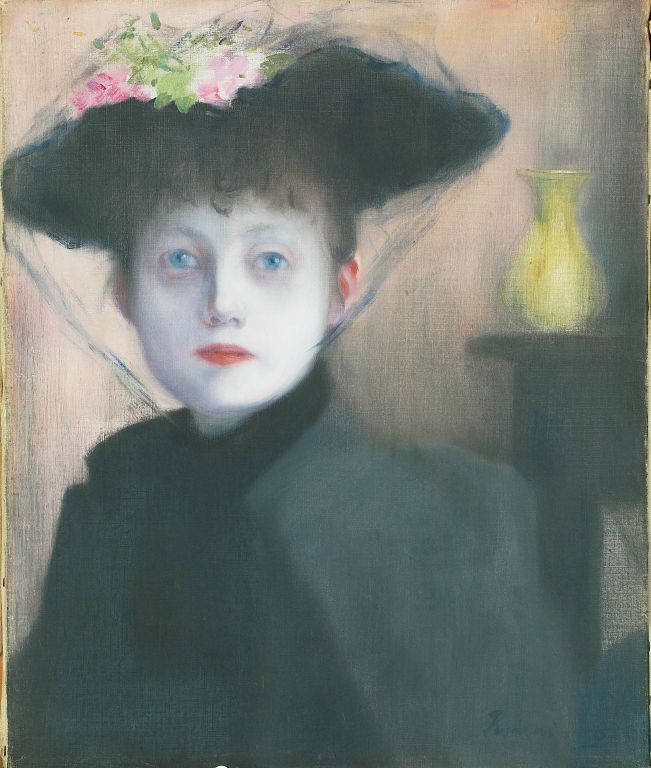
Parisian Woman (1891)

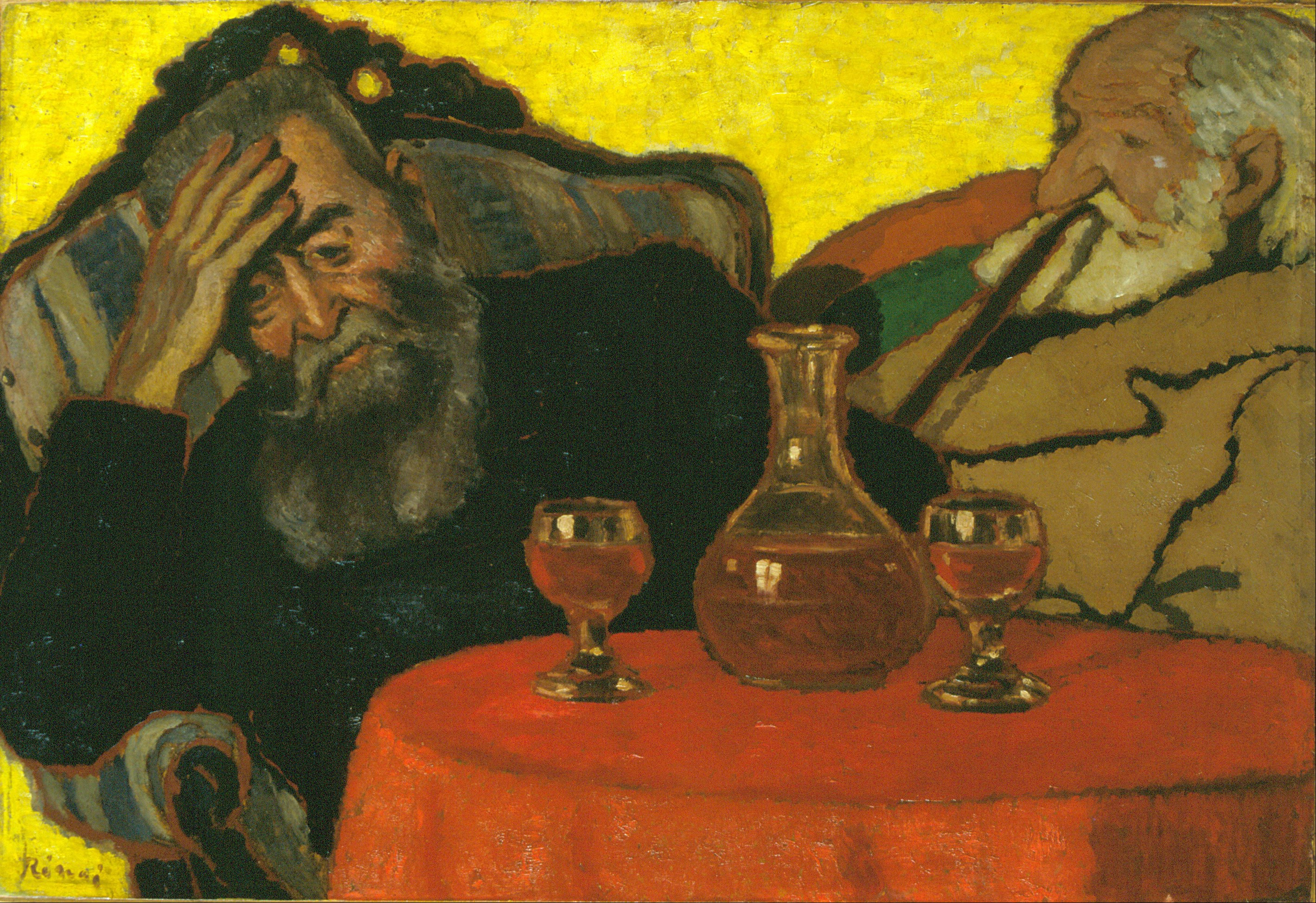
My Father and Uncle Piacsek with Red Wine (1907)

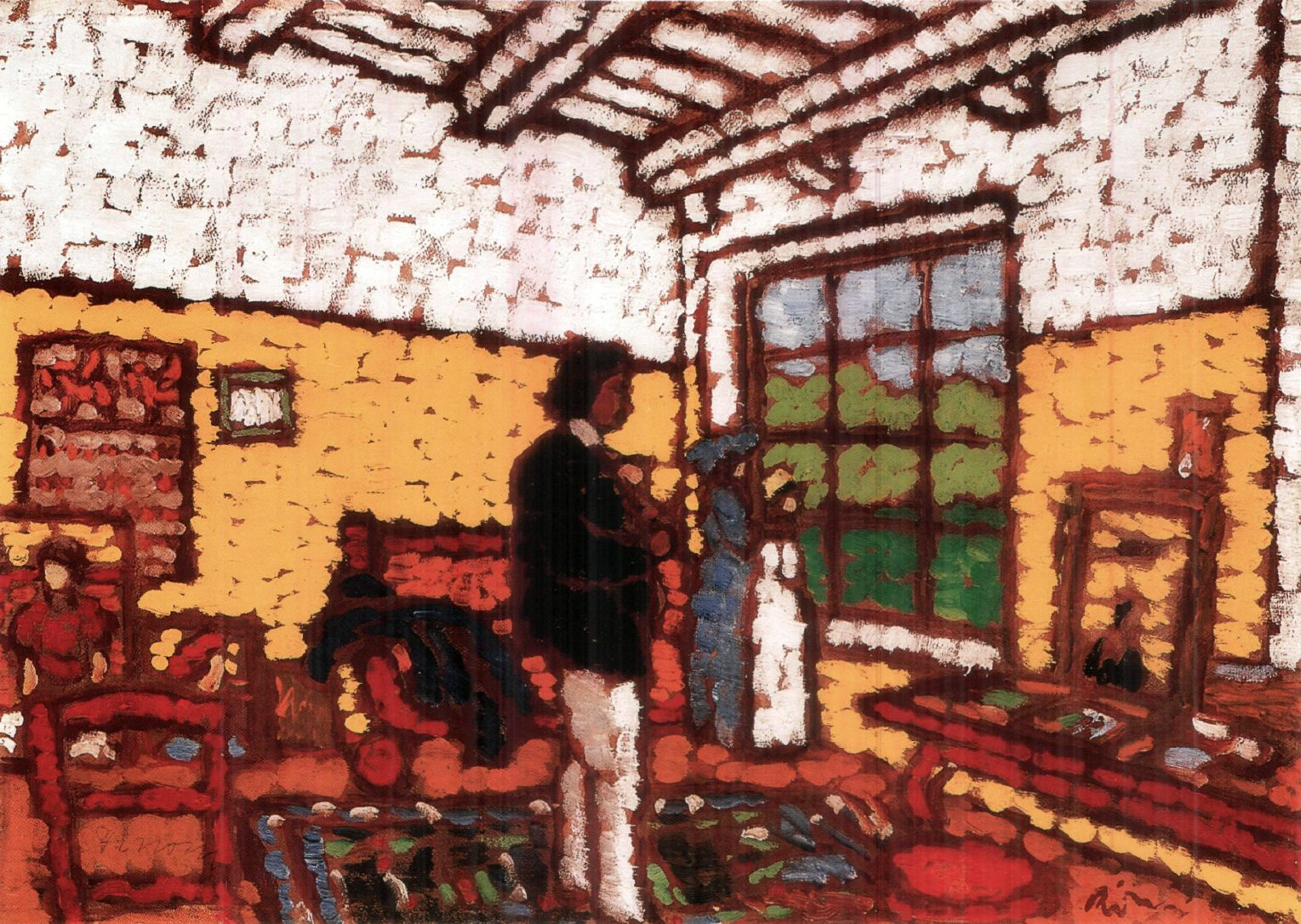
Studio at Kaposvár (1911)

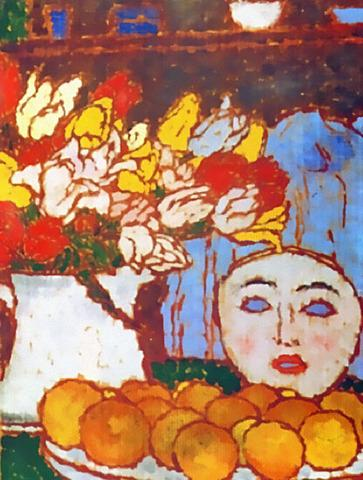
Still-life with Mask (1910)

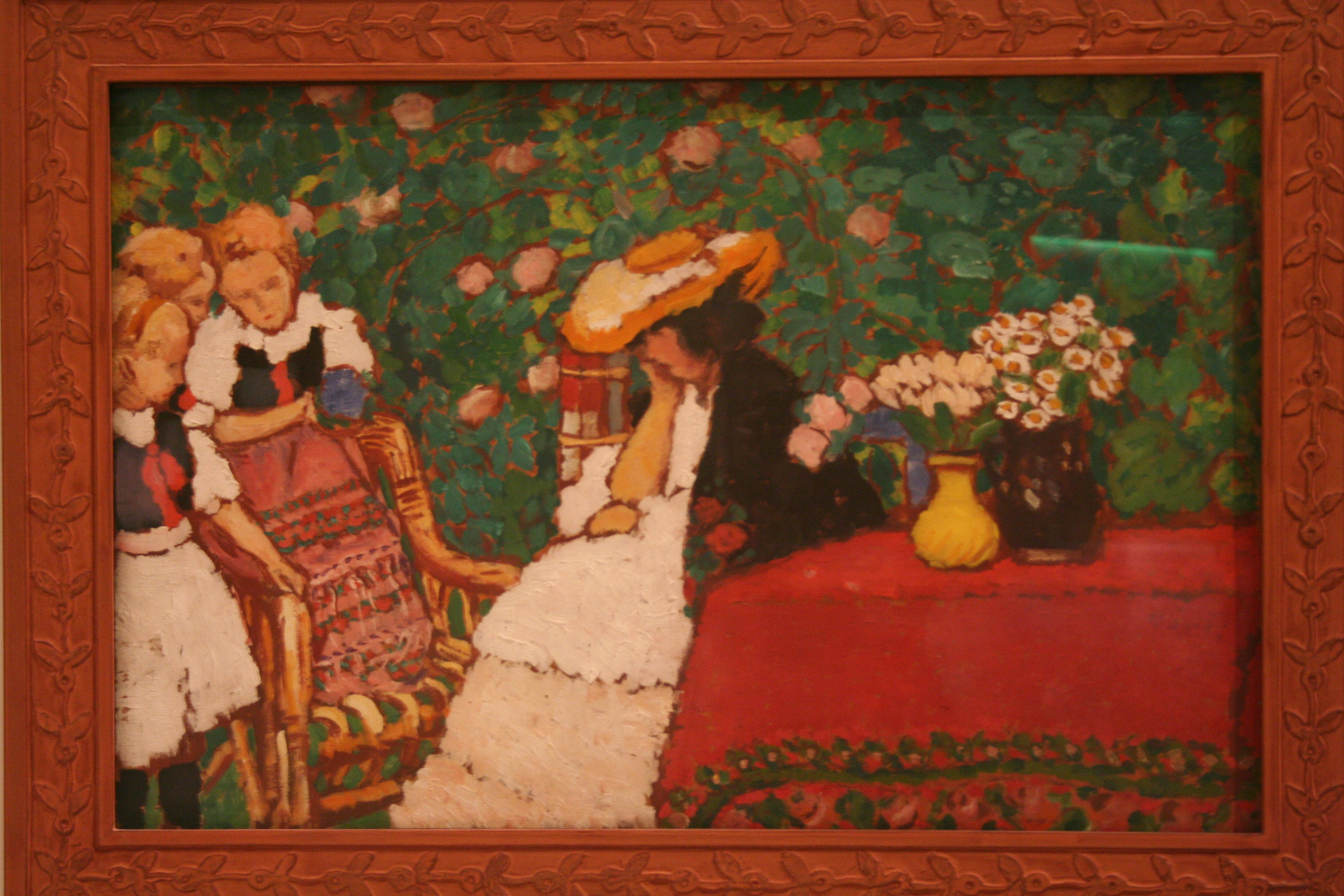
Woman with Three Girls (1909) Brooklyn Museum

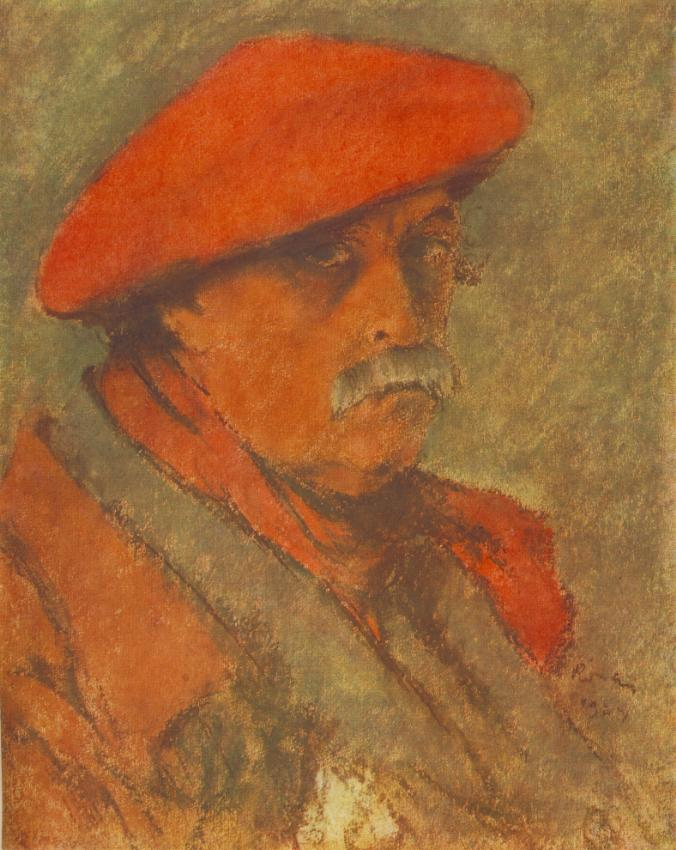
Self portrait (1924), Hungarian National Gallery, Budapest
