= Tivadar Huzella =

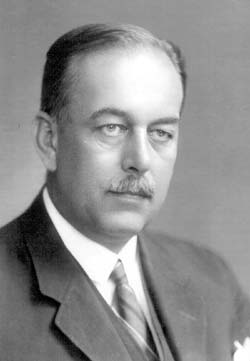

Tivadar Huzella or Theodor Huzella (10 June 1886 – 11 July 1950) was a Hungarian physician, cell biologist, and anatomist. He introduced cell-culture techniques for medical research. Huzella introduced what he called the intercellular theory in which he considered how cells connected with each others as an important area of study. He considered the intercellular system to consist of a network of fibres that exerted an active influence on the entire body. He introduced a number of techniques into the study of cells including micro-cinematography. He has been considered the founder of experimental medicine in Hungary.

== Life and work ==
Huzella was born in Budapest and was from a wealthy business family from Nagyvárad (Oradea) that was in the porcelain trade. He went to school in Budapest and briefly studied at Nagyszombat and graduated from the Piarist Gymnasium. He then studied at the Vienna Commercial Academy but shifted to the natural sciences and received a medical degree in 1911. He studied pathology under Ottó Petrik. He then worked at the Institute of Pathology and Histology. He worked with Ödön Krompecher and in 1912 he became an assistant professor. He visited Berlin in 1912 and in 1914, he attended the Congress of Pathology. During World War I, he was conscripted into the front and served as a military doctor. He served in Székesfehérvár at a hospital in 1916 and then at Montenegrin and then Cetinje (Crna Gora). The war years influenced him into later being a promoter of peace and anti-militarism. In 1916 he moved to the University of Budapest working again alongside Krompecher until the founding of a medical faculty at the Tisza István University of Debrecen where he joined in 1921. He established a institute of anatomy and worked until 1932 when he moved to the University of Budapest to develop the institute of histology and development. He was politically liberal and did not choose to become a member of the MONE (international association of Hungarian doctors) which was led by Ferenc Orsós, with whom he had serious differences. He served as dean of medicine in 1929-30. Around the same time, he began to establish a research station on his family estate at Alsógöd which was visited by many scientists including Alexis Carrel and Max Planck. He received grants from the Rockefeller Foundation and other organization to run this private institute. He presided over the Cell biology congress at Cambridge in 1933, Jena (1935) and Copenhagen (1936). He organized the congress of anatomists in 1939 at Budapest. He retired due to atherosclerosis and moved to his Alsógöd home. In his will he left his estate and research station to what is now the Eötvös Loránd University. He died in 1951 and was buried on his family estate.

Huzella was interested in the histology of the liver and became interested in reticular fibres and the cell matrix. He was a pioneer of vascular replacement using collagen tubes, micro-cinematography, and cell micromanipulation. He wrote a textbook of biology aimed at medical students. He also took an interest in sociology and its implications for medicine. He saw the cell matrix as a fine network produced by cells that connected all the organs and tissues in the body of the organism. In cell cultures he believed that these fibres directed the growth and development of cells to form membranes and organs. He believed that kidney cells could be grown in cultures to form complete kidneys and sought to identify these structure directing fibres using silver impregnation and photographic techniques. He also conducted experiments to show that magnetic fields had an effect on the growth of cells and the movements of the organizing fibres. He used collagen fibre to direct the growth of cell cultures after the findings of Jean Nageotte.

Huzella was also interested in examining applications of ideas from cell biology to human societies. He examined if social problems were similar to cell pathologies. He considered peace to be similar to health and war as analogous to sickness. Romain Rolland appreciated his ideas, examining the social tensions between individuals and groups of people. He also took an interest in music, song, and art, often entertaining guests to his songs.
