= Fellner =

Fellner is a surname. Notable people with the surname include:

- Eduardo Fellner (born 1954), Argentine politician
- Eric Fellner (born 1959), British film producer
- Ernst Fellner (1880-1900), Austrian figure skater
- Ferdinand Fellner (architect) (1847–1916), Austrian architect
- Ferdinand Fellner (painter) (1799–1869), German designer and painter
- Hermann Fellner (1950–2020), German politician, representative of the Christian Social Union of Bavaria
- Jakab Fellner von Fellenthal, (1722–1780), Moravian-Hungarian architect
- Jamie Fellner, Senior Counsel for the United States Program of Human Rights Watch
- Liliana Fellner (born 1957), Argentine politician
- Rosie Fellner (born 1978), Irish actress
- Till Fellner (born 1972), Austrian pianist
- Werner Jaffé Fellner (1914–2009), German chemist and university professor
