= List of equestrian statues in France =

List of public equestrian monuments

This is a list of equestrian statues in France. In each region, statues are ranked by chronological order of first erection in the listed location.

== Paris and Ile-de-France ==
=== Paris ===
- Henri IV on the Pont Neuf, by François-Frédéric Lemot (1818) replacing destroyed predecessor of 1614
- Louis XIII on Place des Vosges, by Charles Dupaty and Jean-Pierre Cortot (1825), marble replacing destroyed bronze predecessor of 1639
- Louis XIV on Place des Victoires, by François Joseph Bosio (1828)
- Joan of Arc on Rue de Rivoli, by Emmanuel Frémiet (1874, reworked in 1899)
- Genius of Arts on the Louvre Palace façade facing the Seine, by Antonin Mercié (1877) replacing a bas-relief of Napoleon III by Antoine-Louis Barye (1869) deposed on 6 September 1870 and now at the Château de Compiègne
- Charlemagne et ses Leudes in front of Notre-Dame de Paris, by the brothers Louis and Charles Rochet (1878), erected in 1882
- Etienne Marcel besides the Hôtel de Ville, by Antonin Idrac and Laurent Marqueste (1888)
- The Poet astride Pegasus near Place Édouard-VII, by Alexandre Falguière (1897)
- Joan of Arc in front of Saint-Augustin, by Paul Dubois (1895), erected in 1900
- George Washington on Place d'Iéna, by Daniel Chester French and Edward Clark Potter (1900)
- Gladiator by Isidore Bonheur (1902), erected in Sainte-Anne Hospital Center in 1942
- Lafayette on the Cours-la-Reine, by Paul Wayland Bartlett (1908), relocated from the Louvre in 1984; a copy was erected in 2017 at the Monument Pershing - Lafayette in Versailles
- Edward VII on Place Édouard-VII, by Paul Landowski (1913)
- Saint Louis and Joan of Arc in front of the Basilique du Sacré-Cœur, by Hippolyte Lefèbvre (1927)
- Simón Bolívar on the Cours-la-Reine, by Emmanuel Frémiet (1930), new cast of 1910 original in Bogotá, relocated to current site in 1980
- La France renaissante on the Pont de Bir-Hakeim, by Holger Wederkinch (1930)
- Alexander I of Yugoslavia at La Muette, by Maxime Real del Sarte (1936)
- Albert I of Belgium near the Place de la Concorde, by Armand Martial (1938)
- Joseph Joffre in front of École Militaire, by Maxime Real del Sarte (1939)
- Ferdinand Foch facing the Trocadéro, by Robert Wlérick and Raymond Martin (1951)
- José de San Martín in the Parc Montsouris, by Louis-Joseph Daumas (1960), new cast of 1862 original in Buenos Aires
- Louis XIV in front of Louvre Pyramid, by Gian Lorenzo Bernini (1988), cast in lead of the 1670s marble original kept at Versailles

=== Ile-de-France ===
- Marble statue of Louis XIV at the Palace of Versailles, by Gian Lorenzo Bernini (1670s); now replaced by a copy at the end of the pièce d'eau des Suisses
- Ferdinand Philippe, Duke of Orléans in Neuilly-sur-Seine, by Carlo Marochetti (1845), initially erected near Djamaa el Djedid in Algiers and relocated in 1981
- Louis XIV in front of the Palace of Versailles, by Pierre Cartellier and Louis Petitot (1837), originally intended for the Place de la Concorde; repositioned in 2009
- Napoleon at Montereau-Fault-Yonne, by Charles Pierre Victor Pajol (1867)
- Anne de Montmorency at the Château de Chantilly, by Paul Dubois (1886)
- Henri d'Orléans, Duke of Aumale in front of the Château de Chantilly, by Jean-Léon Gérôme (1899)
- John Pershing at the Monument Pershing - Lafayette in Versailles, by Joachim Costa (designed in 1937, completed 2017)
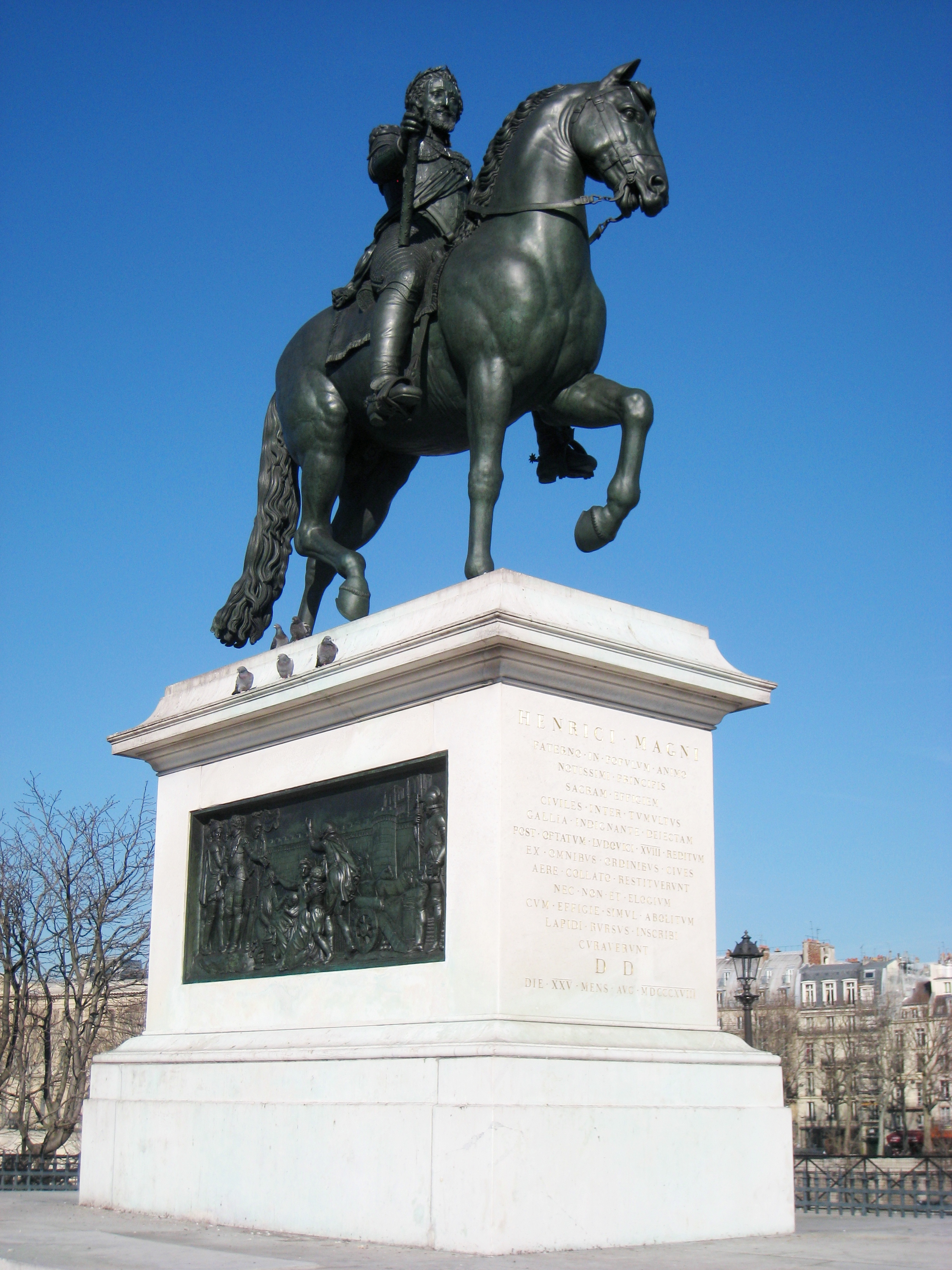
King Henri IV on the Pont Neuf

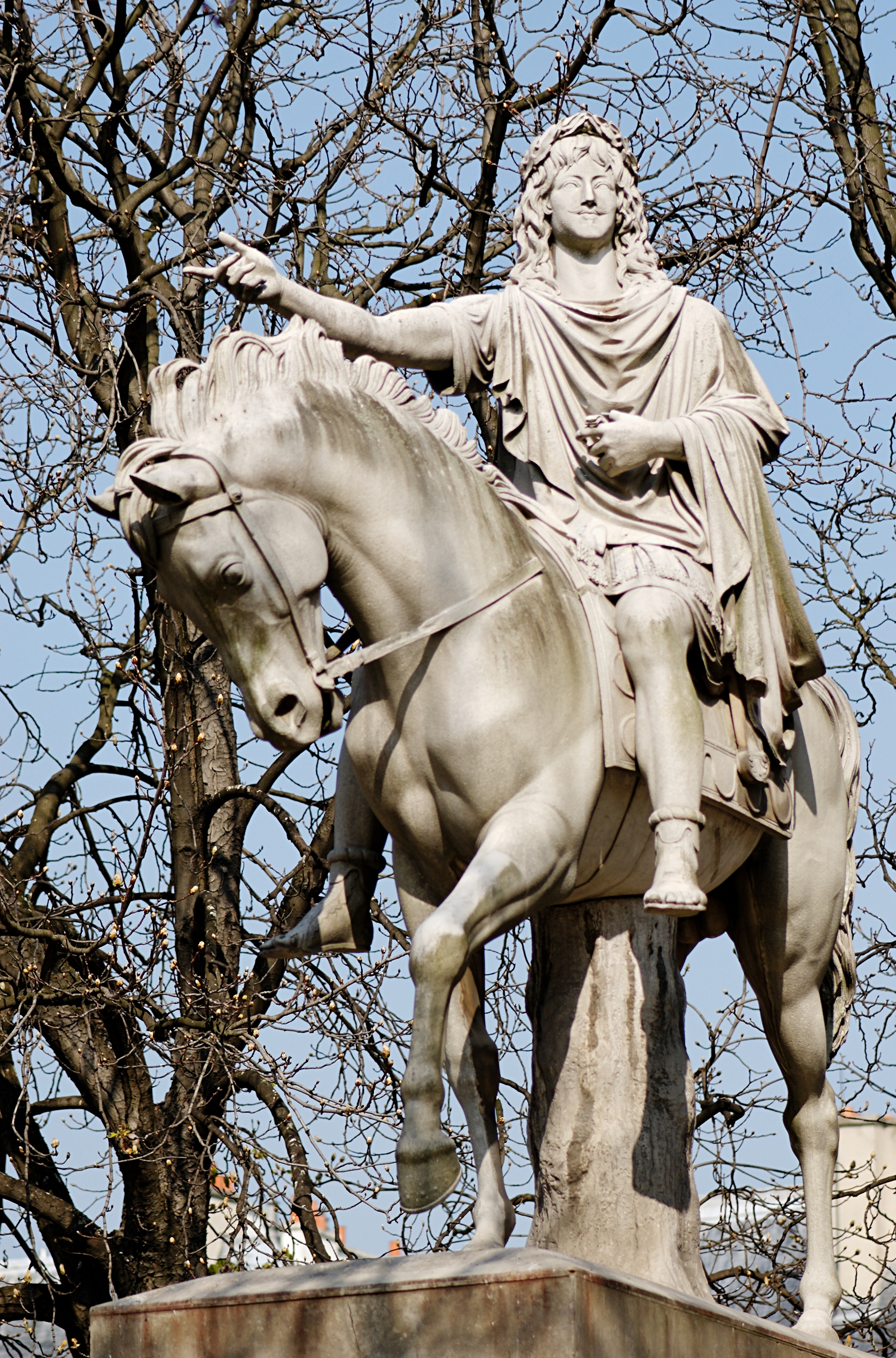
King Louis XIII at Place des Vosges

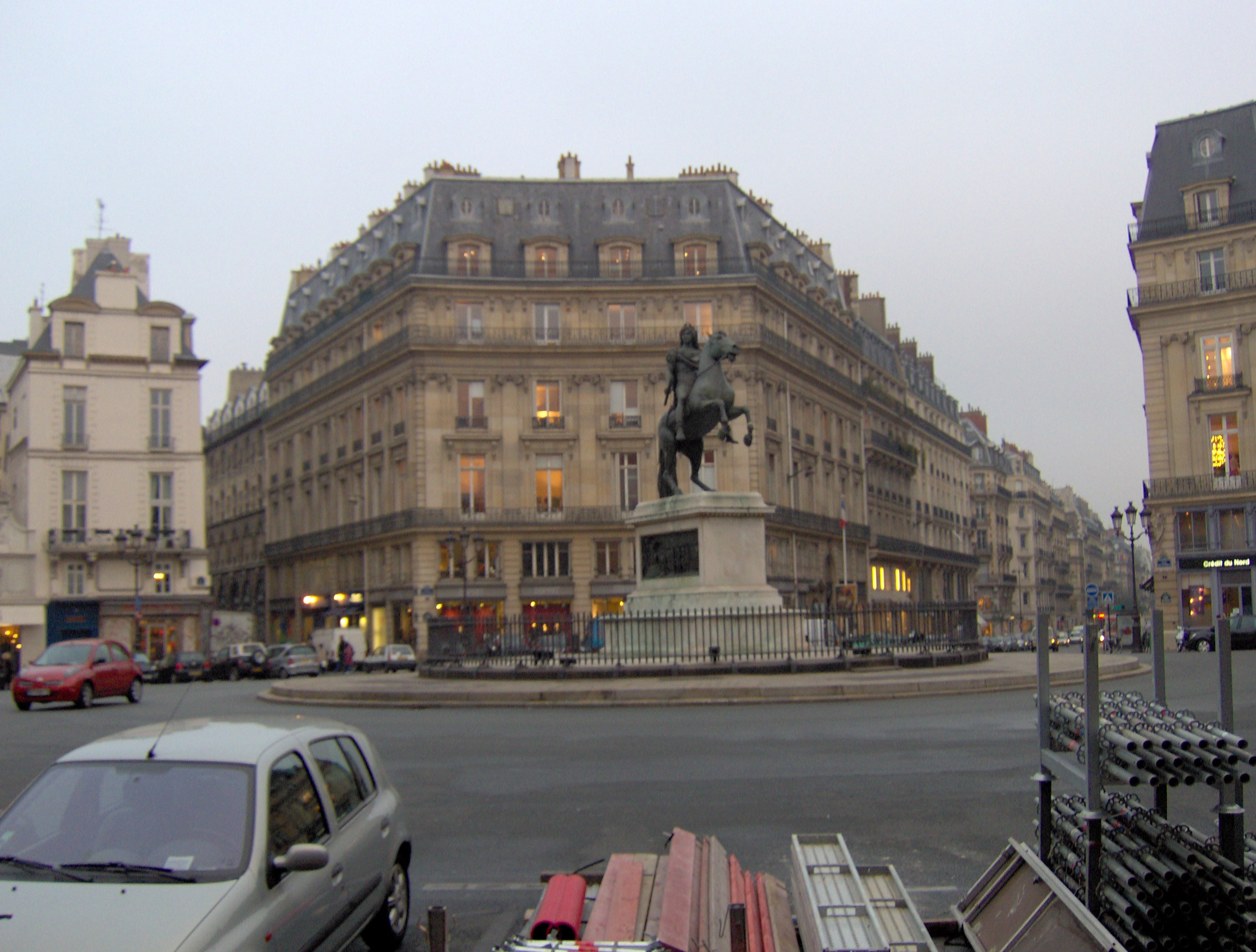
King Louis XIV at the Place des Victoires

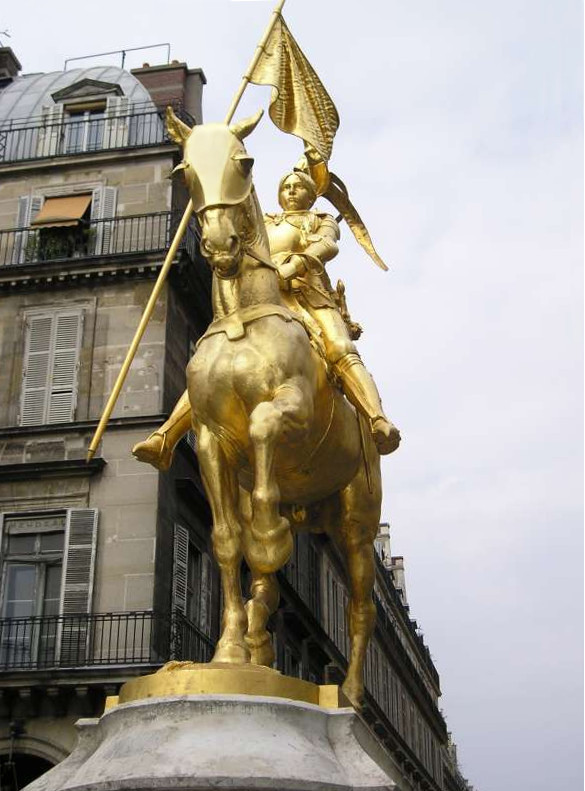
Jeanne d'Arc in the Rue de Rivoli

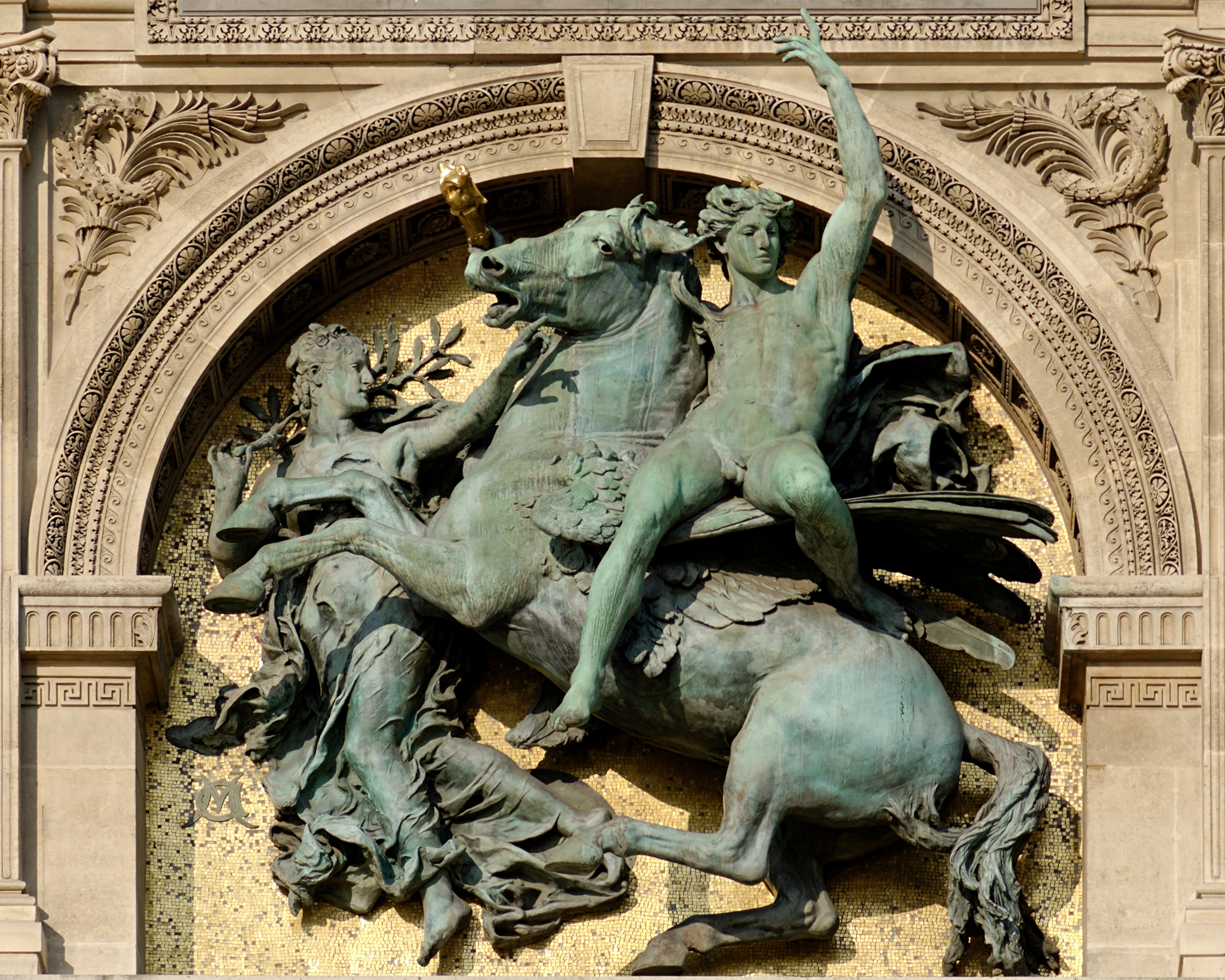
Genius of Arts on the Louvre Palace south side

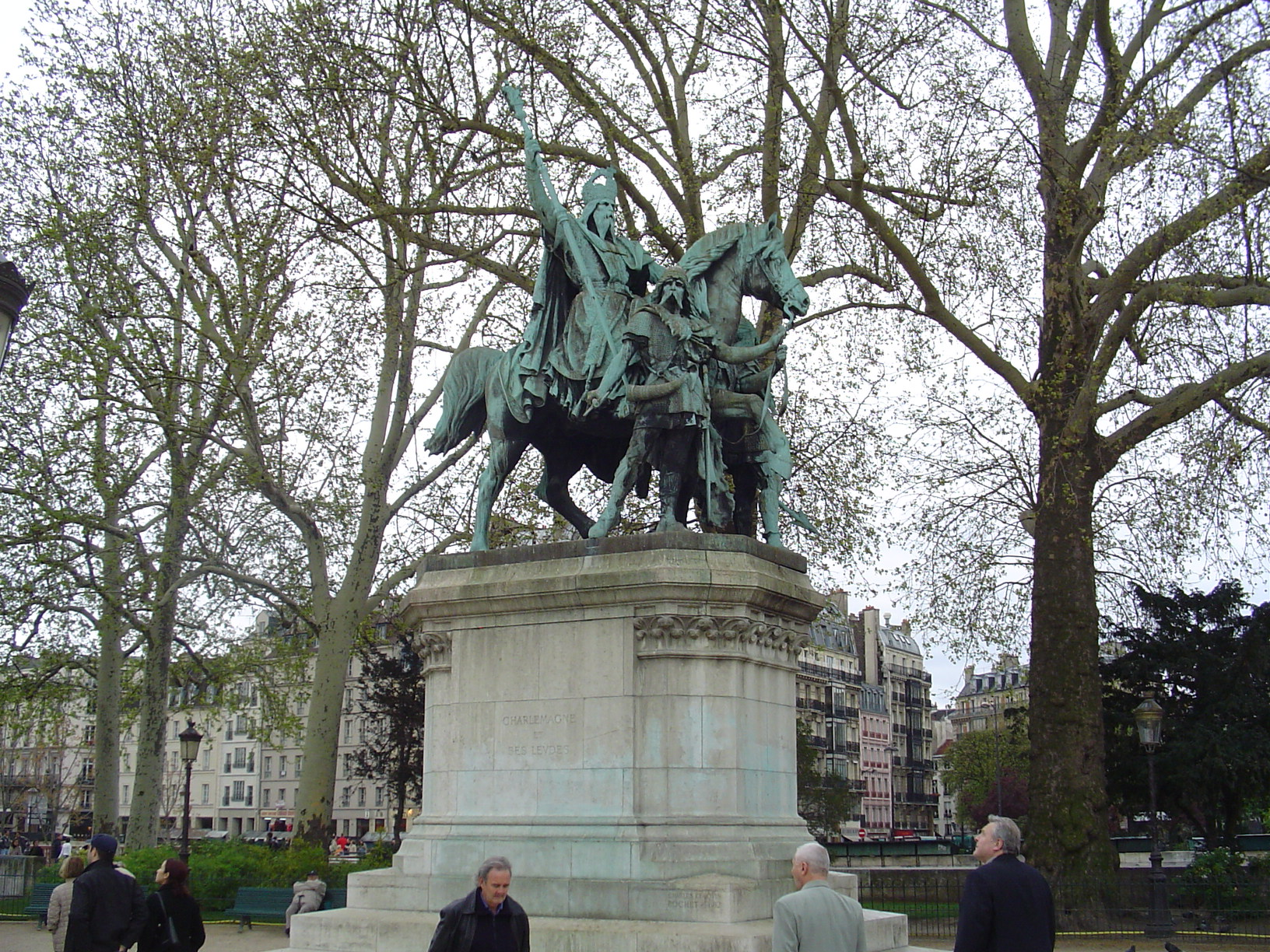
Charlemagne in front of the Notre Dame de Paris

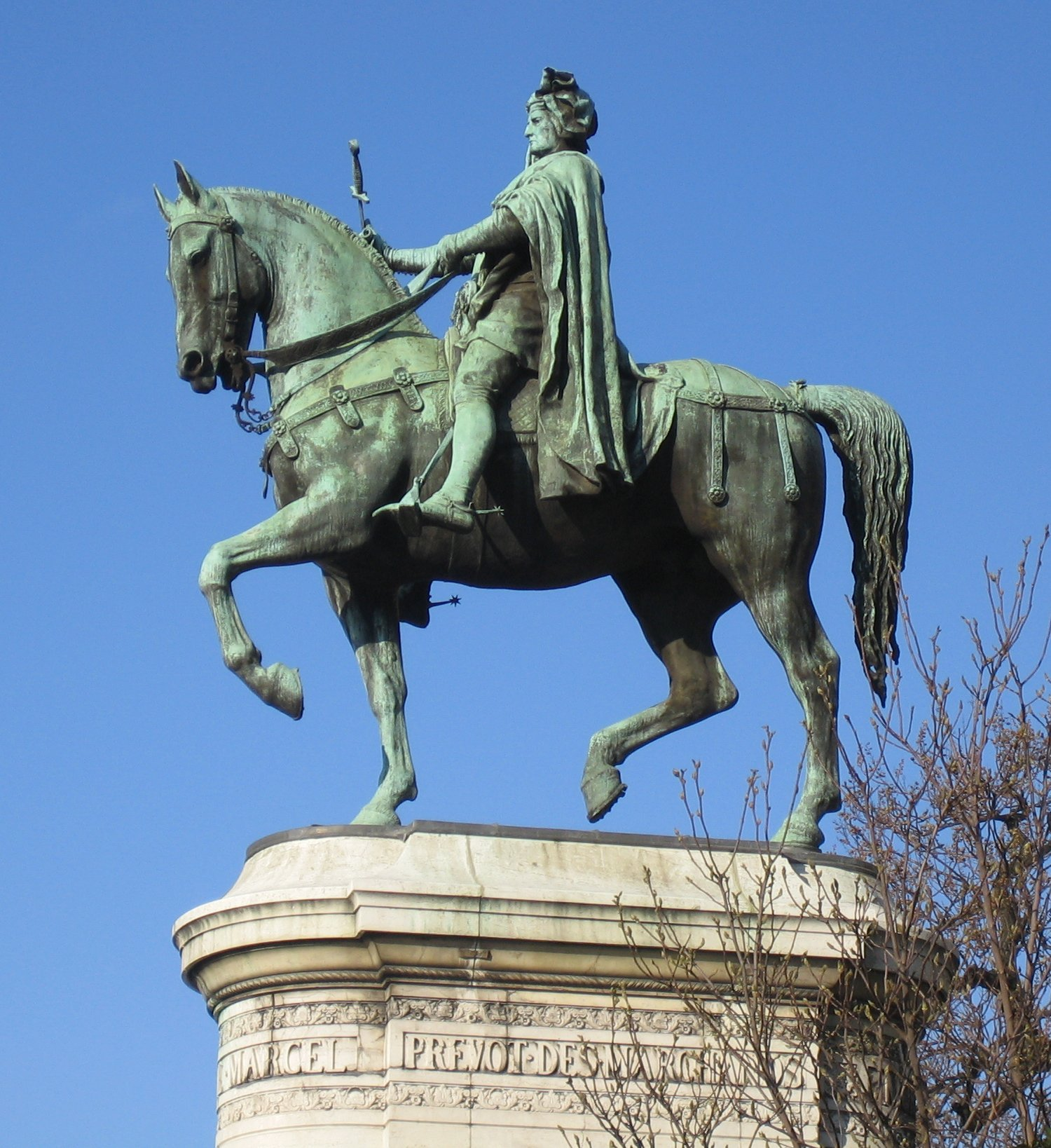
Etienne Marcel near the Hôtel de Ville

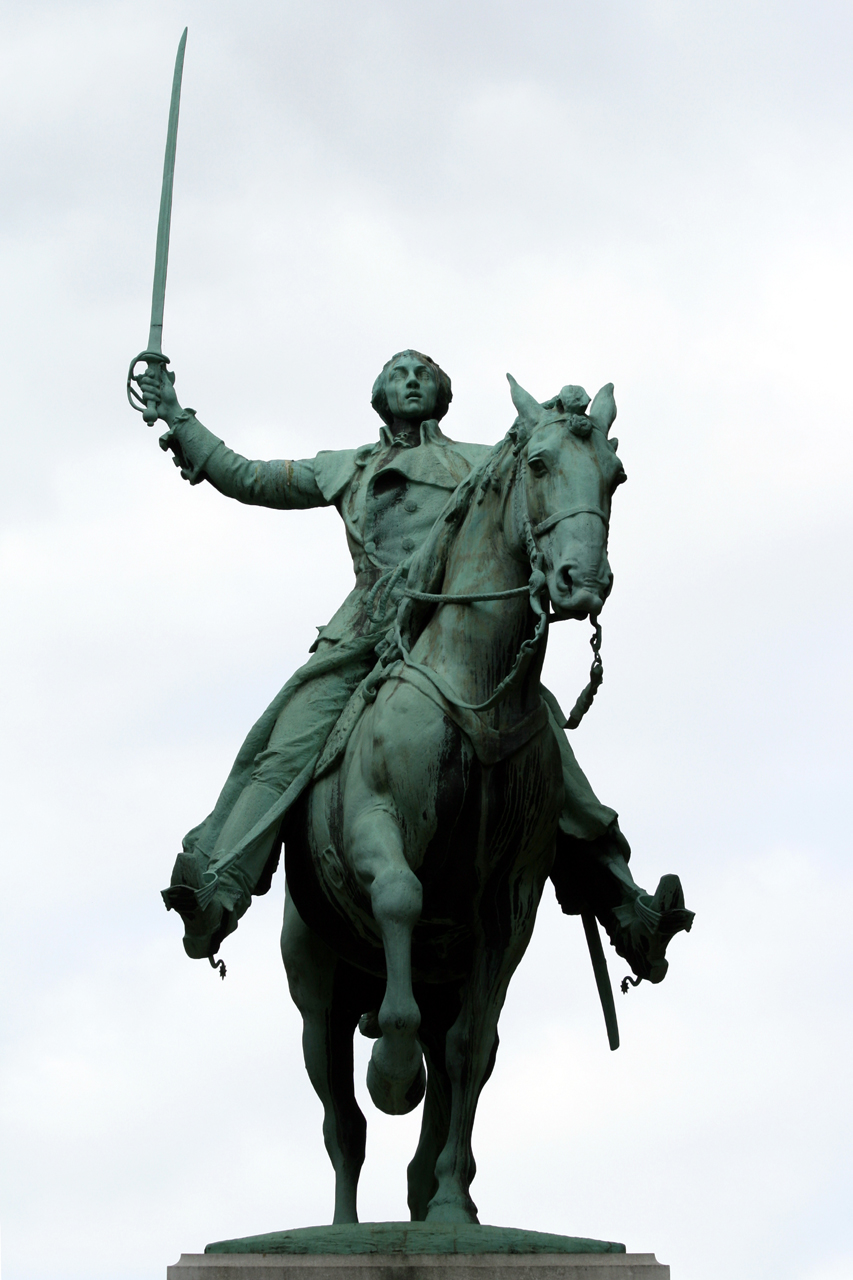
General Lafayette at Cours la Reine

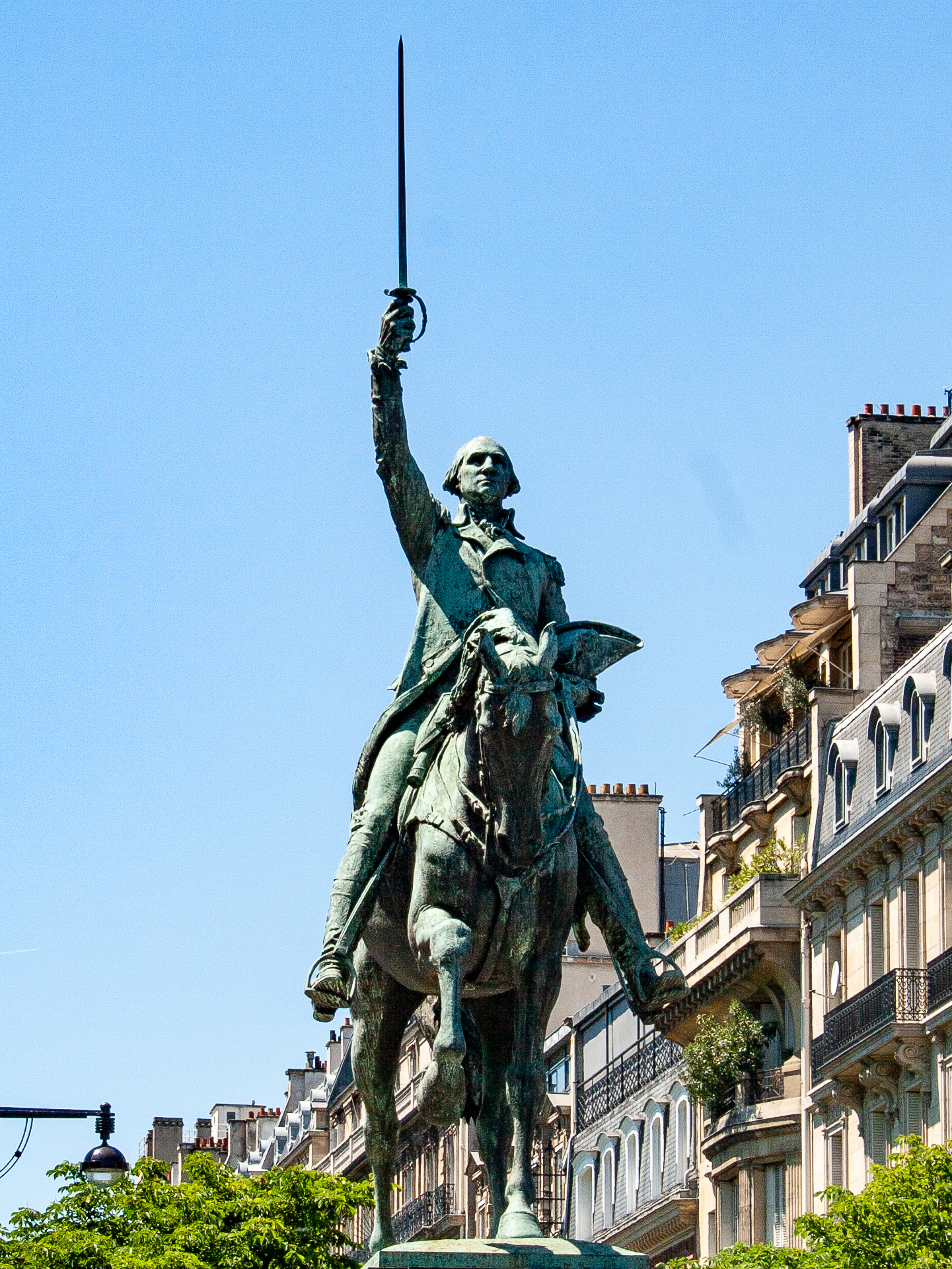
George Washington on Place d'Iéna

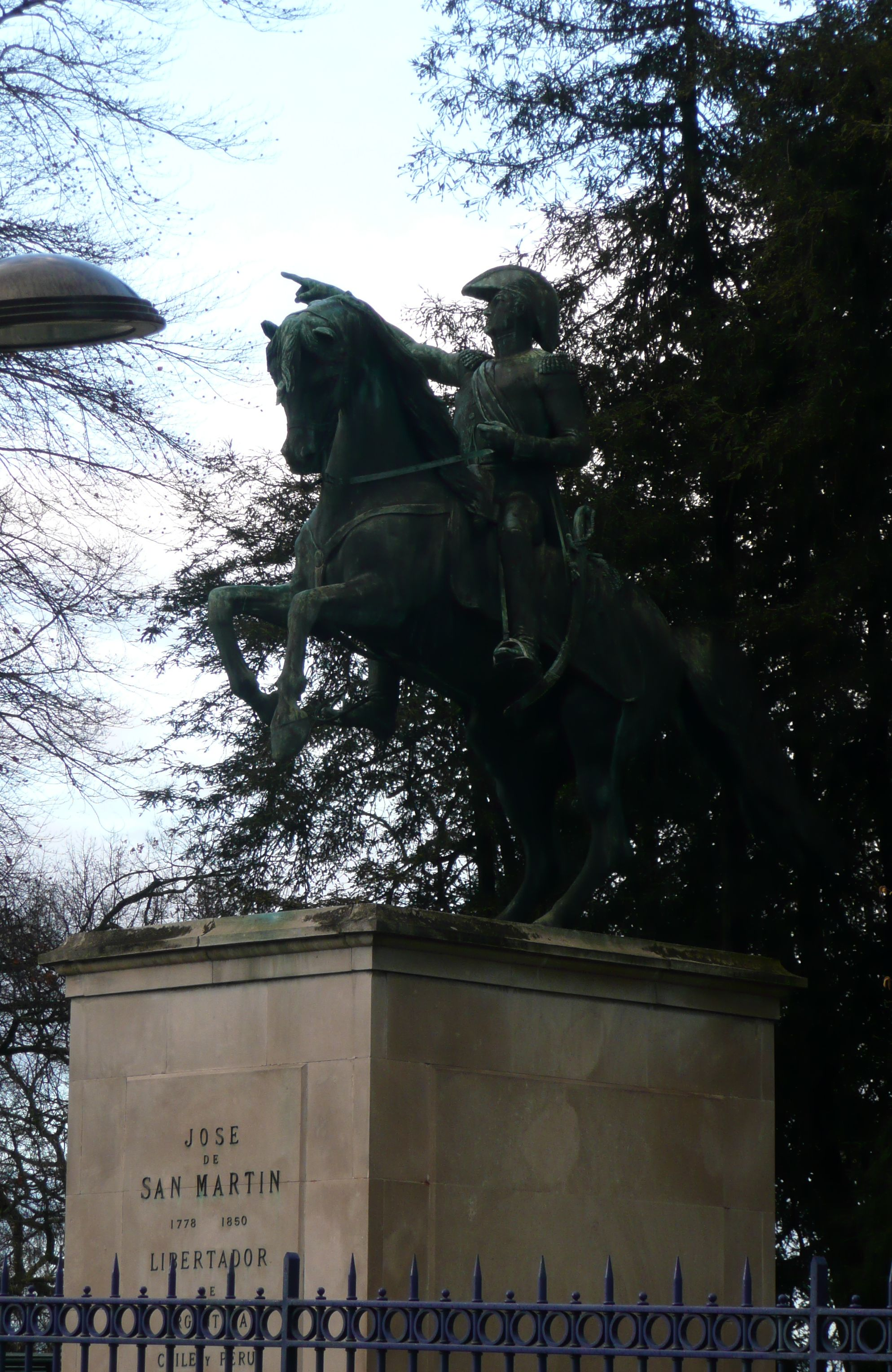
José de San Martín in the Parc Montsouris

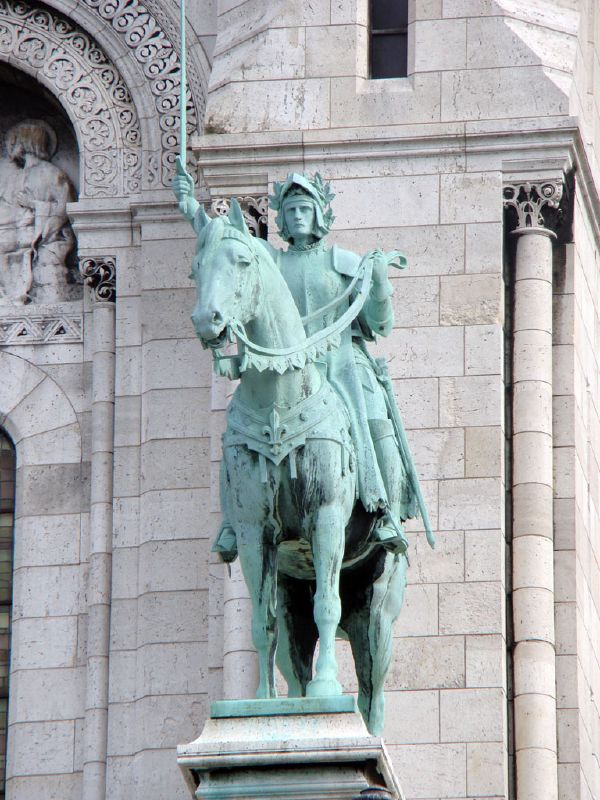
Jeanne d'Arc in front of the Basilique du Sacré-Cœur

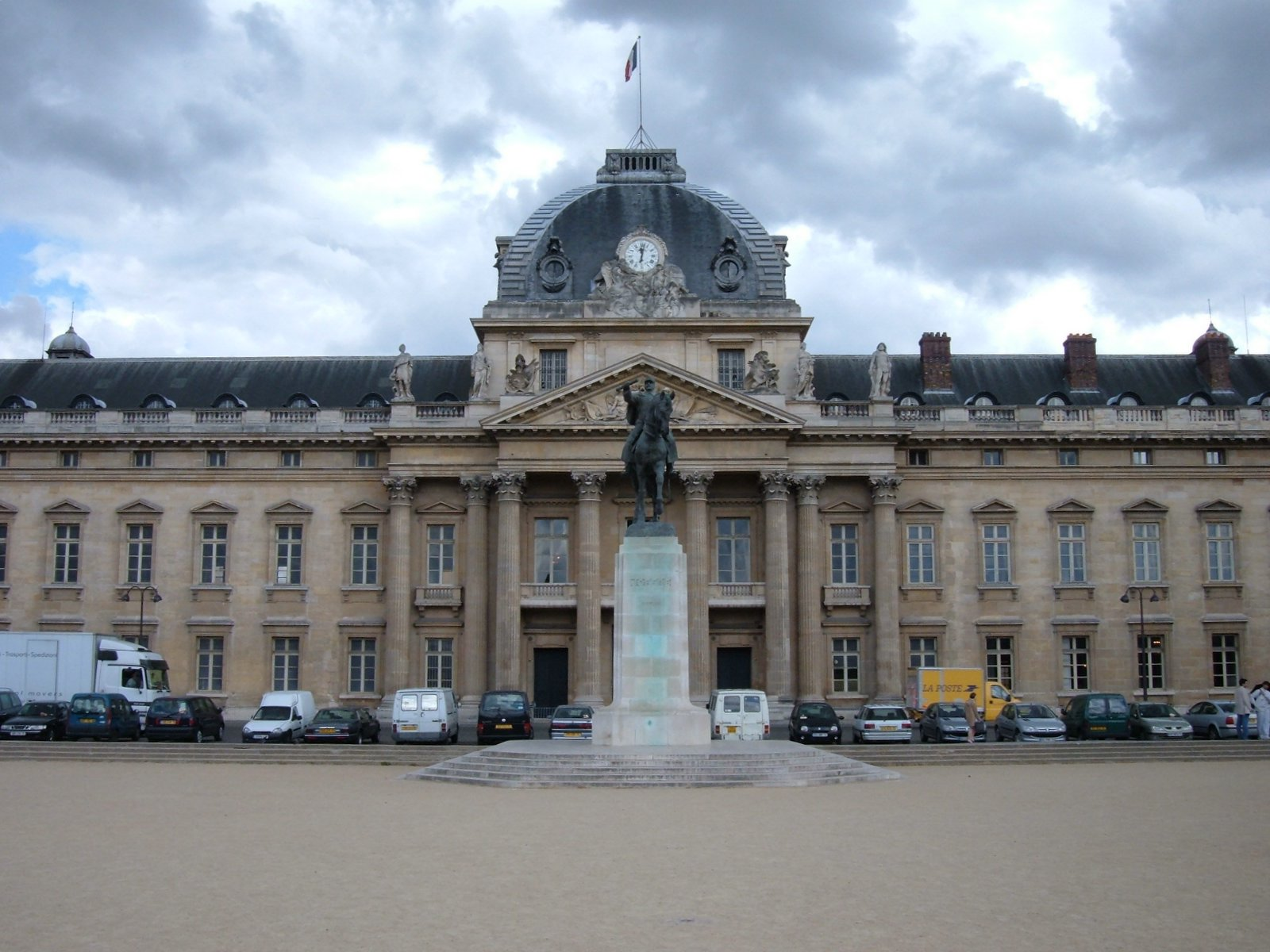
Joseph Joffre in front of École Militaire

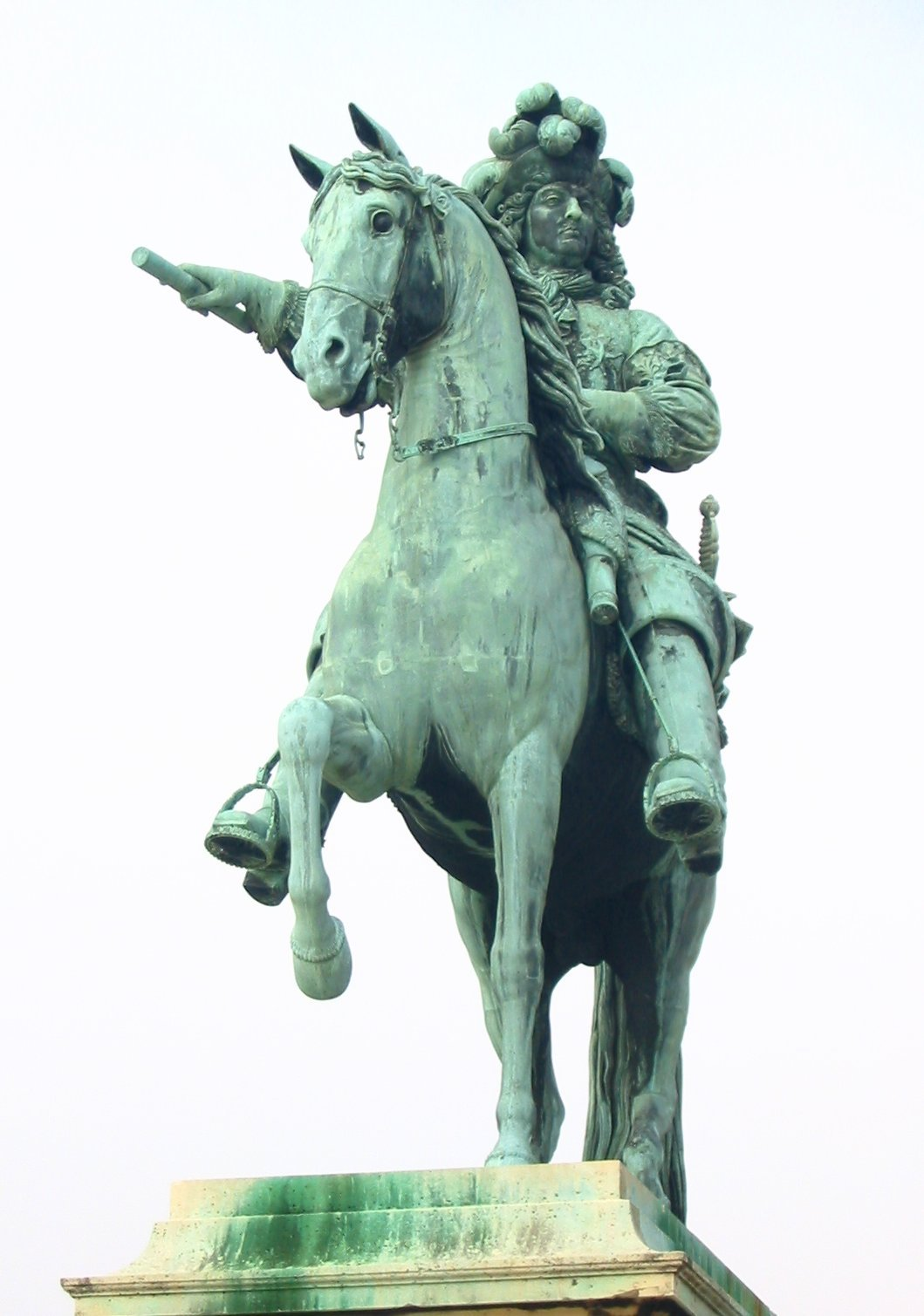
Louis XIV in Versailles

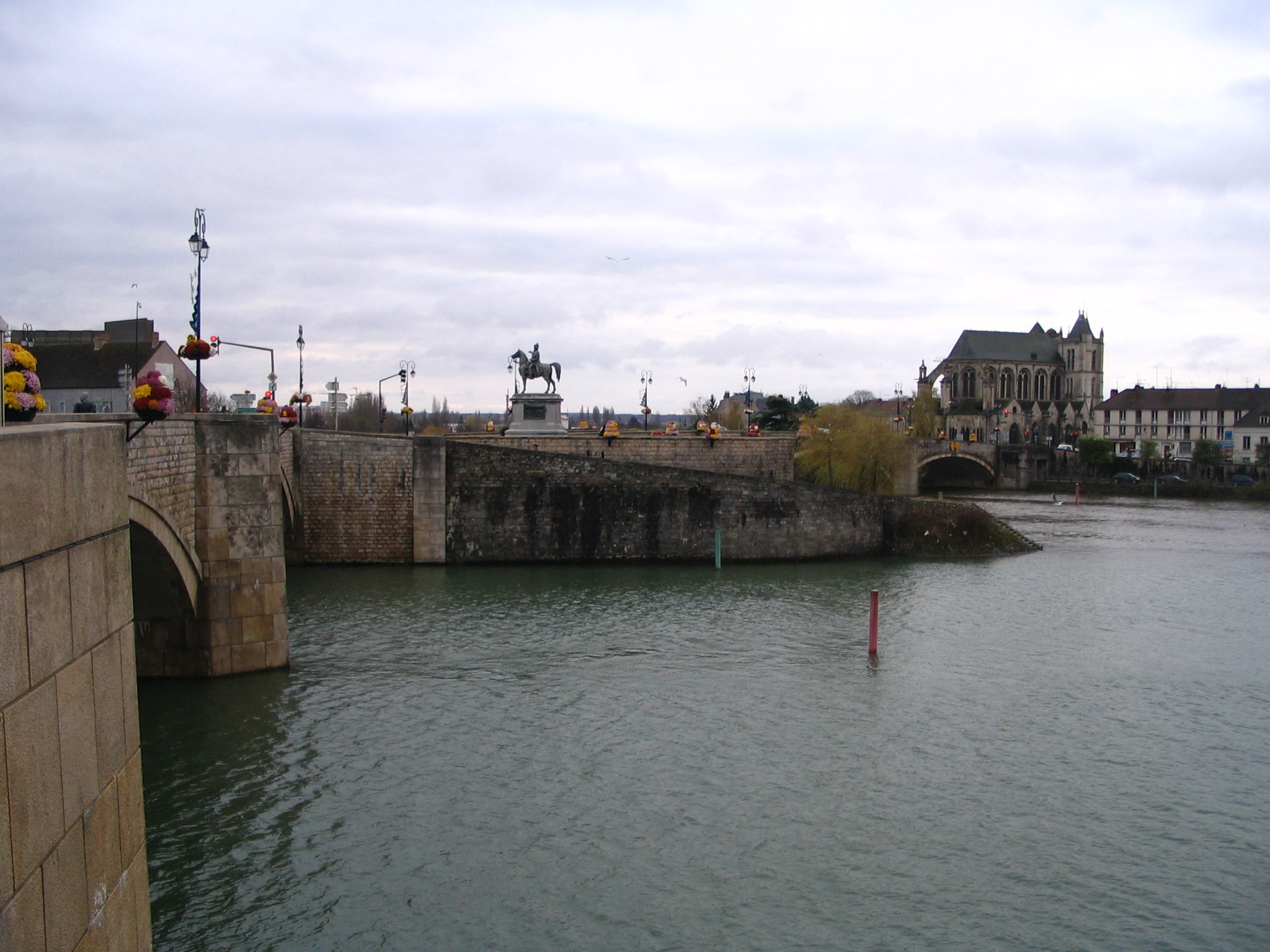
Napoleon at Montereau-Fault-Yonne

== Auvergne-Rhône-Alpes ==
- Louis XIV on Place Bellecour in Lyon, by François-Frédéric Lemot (1826), replacing destroyed predecessor of 1713
- Napoleon on the Prairie de la Rencontre in Laffrey, by Emmanuel Frémiet (1868), originally erected in Grenoble, warehoused in 1870 and re-erected at present site in 1929
- Philis de La Charce at the jardins des Dauphins in Grenoble, by Pierre-Etienne Daniel Campagne (1900)
- Vercingetorix on Place de Jaude in Clermont-Ferrand, by Frédéric Auguste Bartholdi (1903)
- Joan of Arc in Saint-Étienne, by Emmanuel Frémiet (1916), new cast of the Paris version
- Joan of Arc in Lyon, by Jean-Louis Chorel (1928)
- Sur les Talons in Briançon, by Gari (2016)
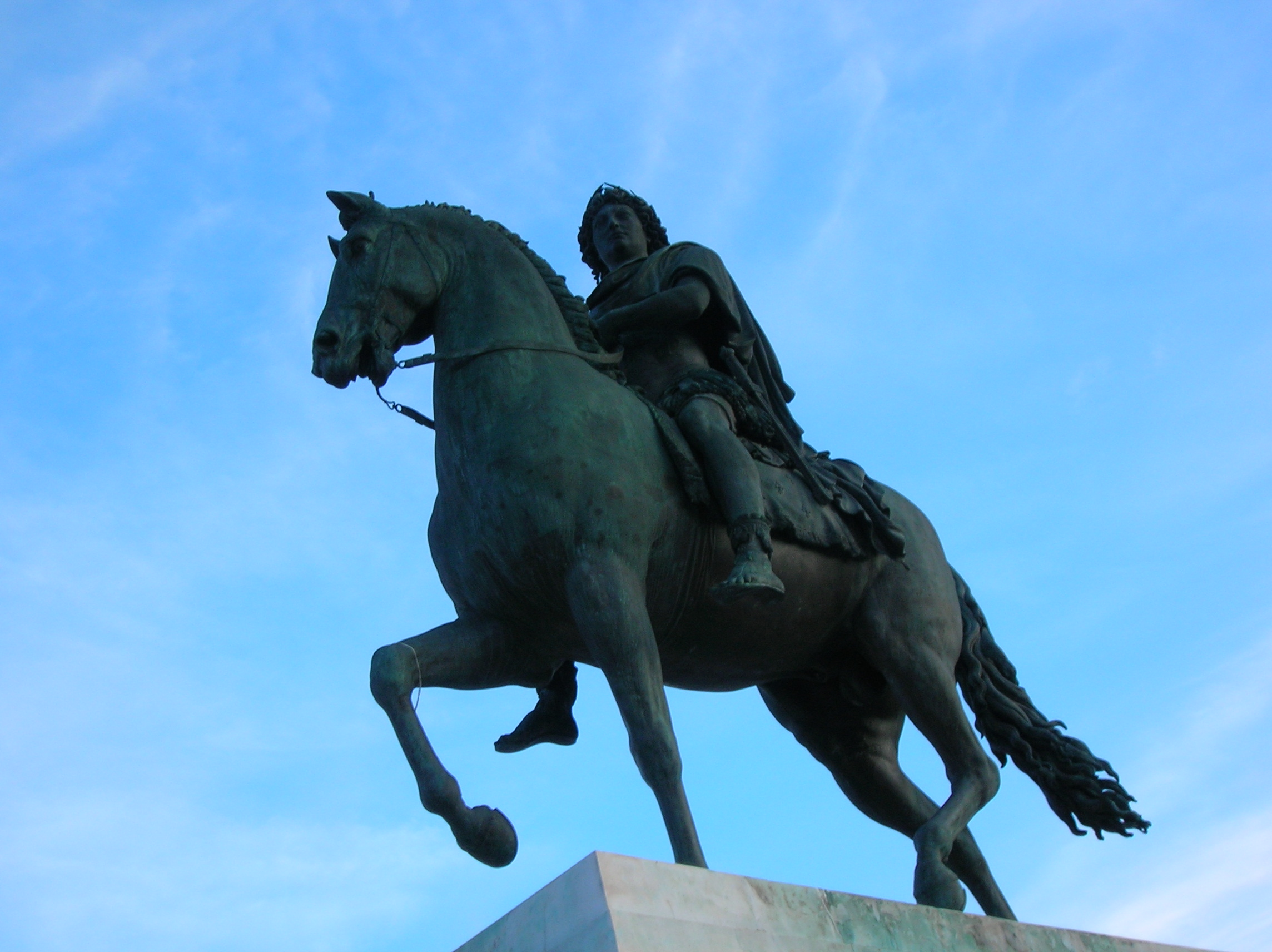
Louis XIV in Lyon

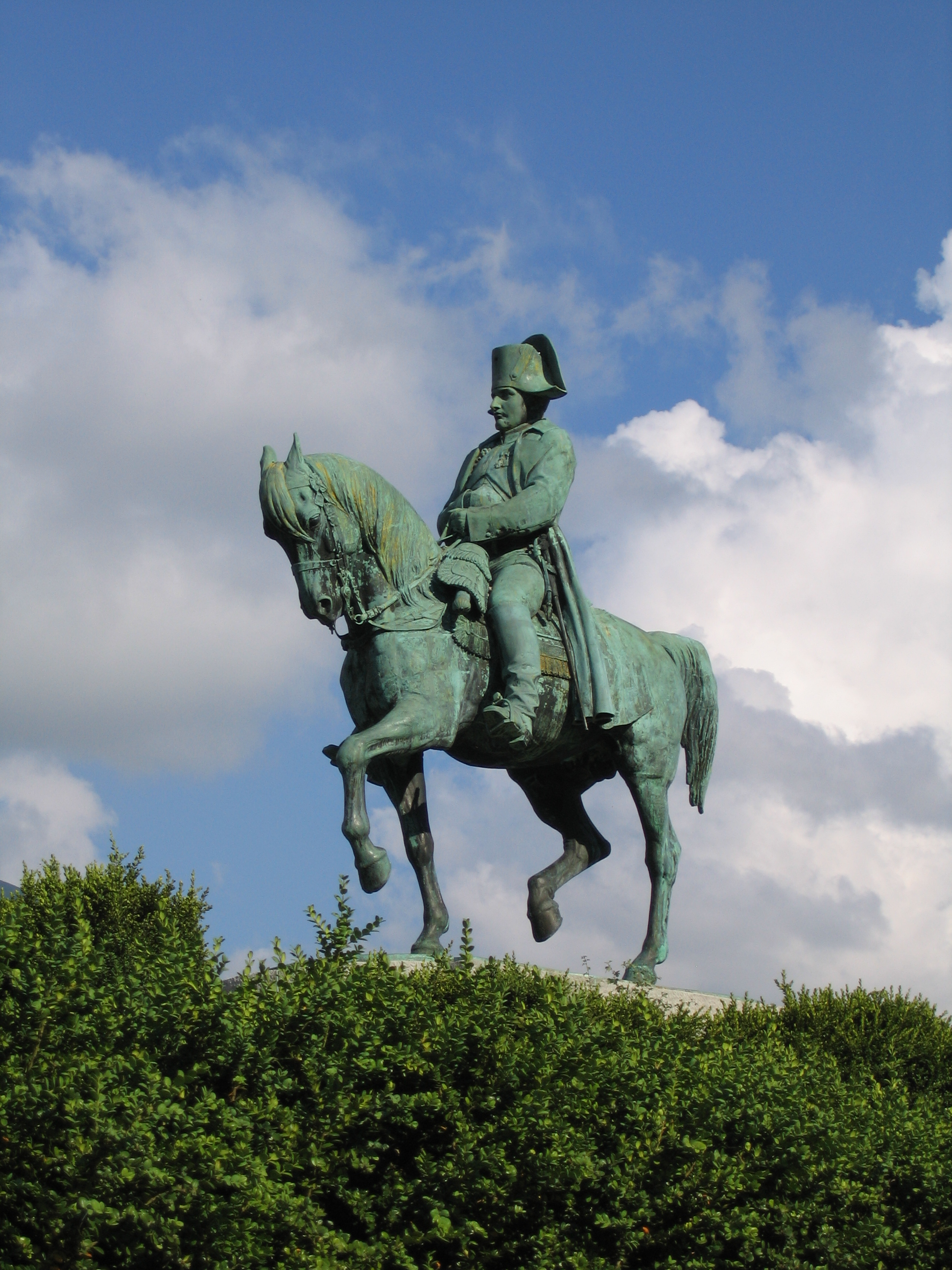
Napoléon in Laffrey

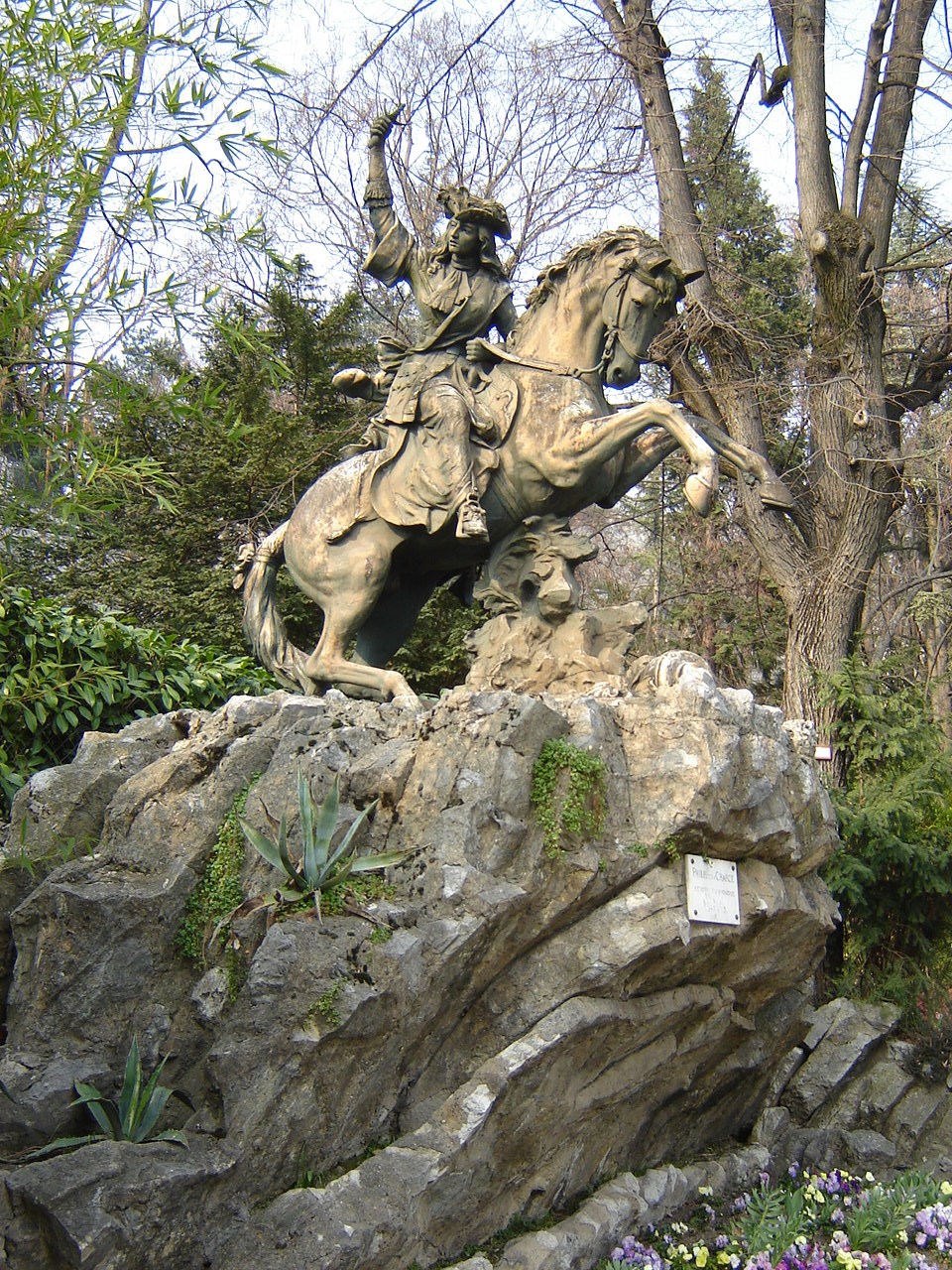
Philis de La Charce in Grenoble

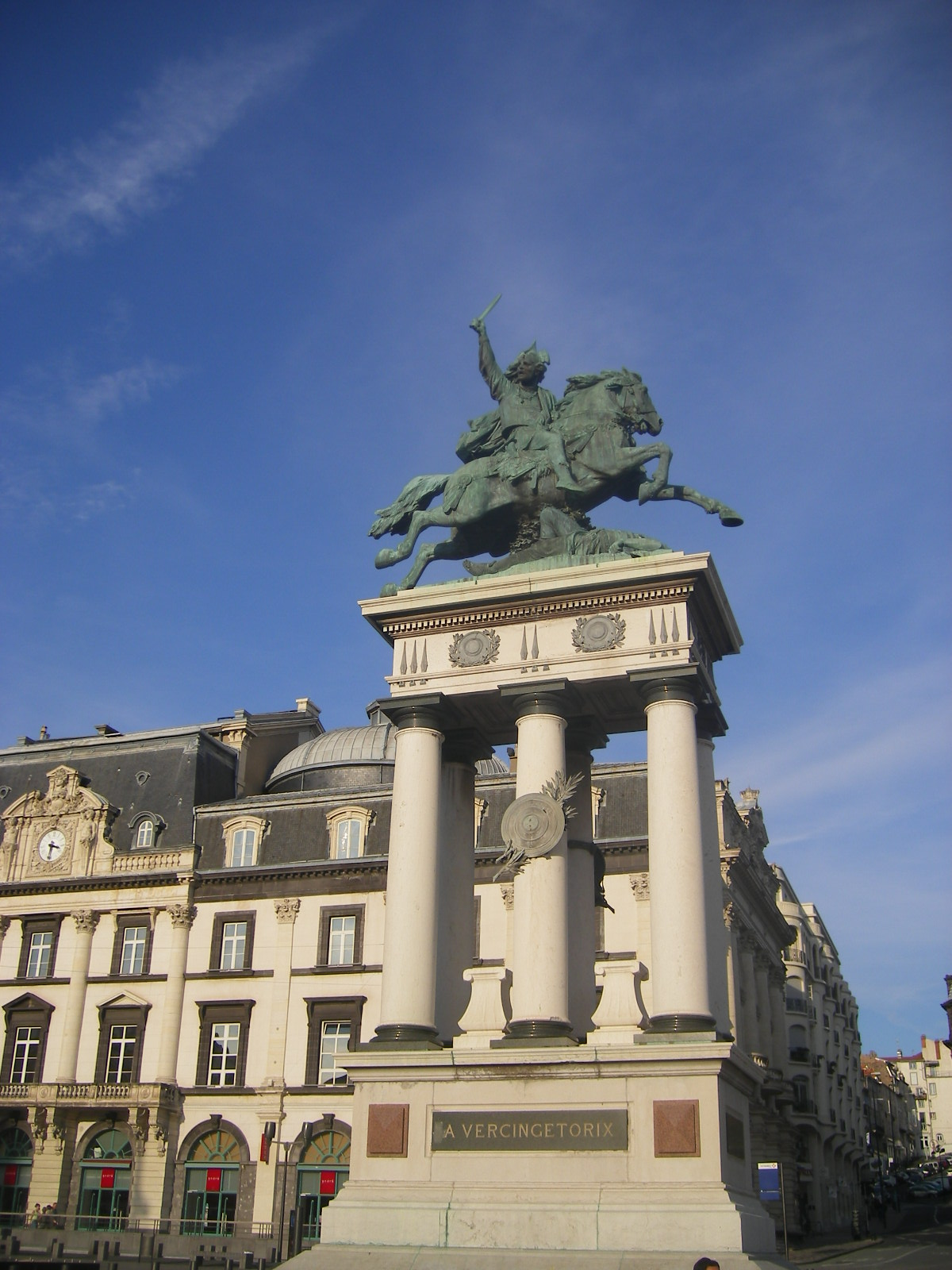
Vercingetorix in Clermont-Ferrand

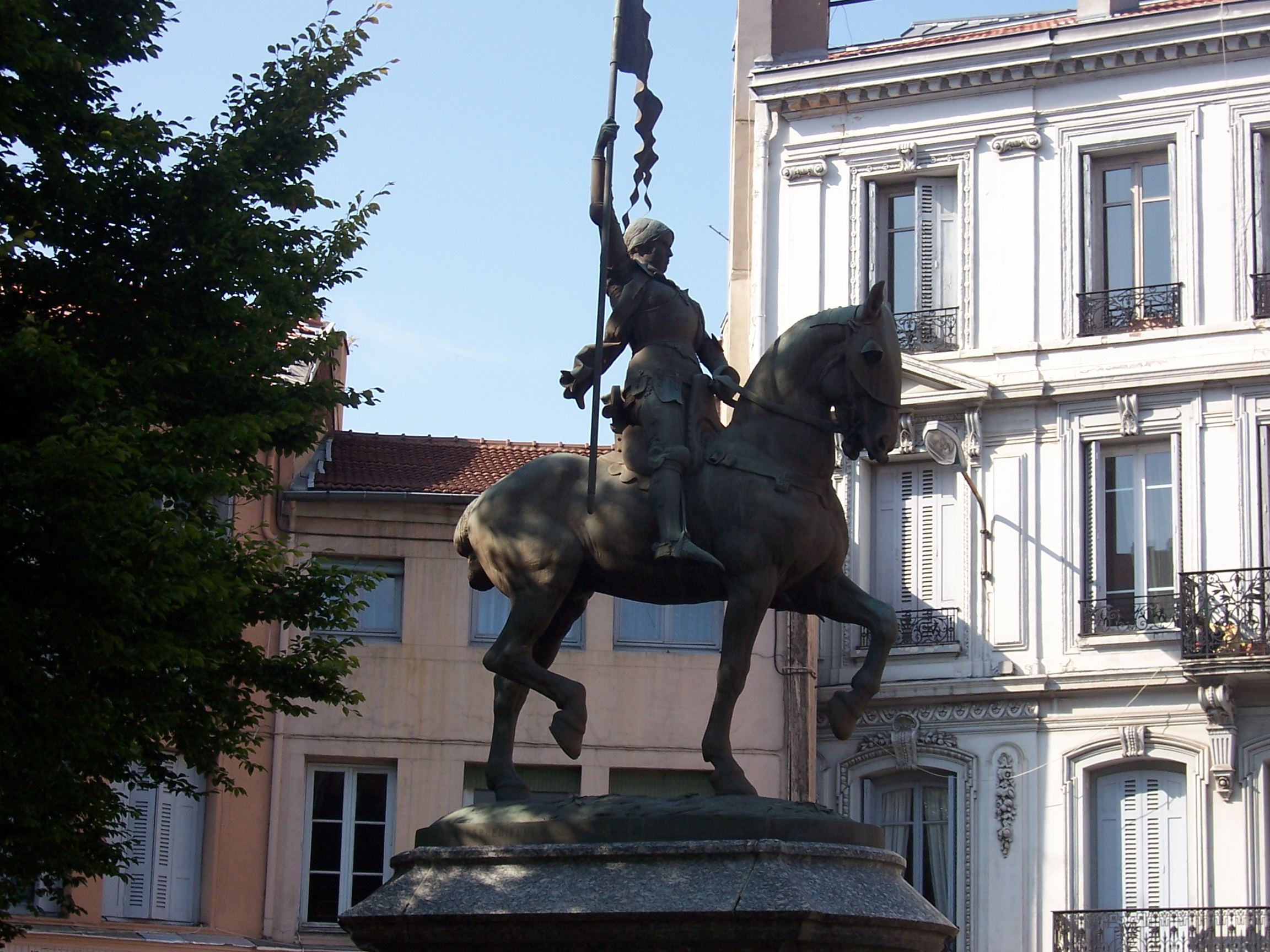
Joan of Arc in Saint-Étienne

== Bourgogne-Franche-Comté ==
- Joan of Arc in Alise-Sainte-Reine, by Mathurin Moreau and Pierre Le Nordez (1901), new cast of the Montebourg version
- The Defense in Chalon-sur-Saône, by Paul Moreau-Vauthier (1907)

== Bretagne ==
- General Lariboisiere in Fougères, by Georges Récipon (1893)
- Bertrand du Guesclin in Dinan, by Emmanuel Frémiet (1902)
- Duke Arthur III in Vannes, by Arthur Le Duc (1905)
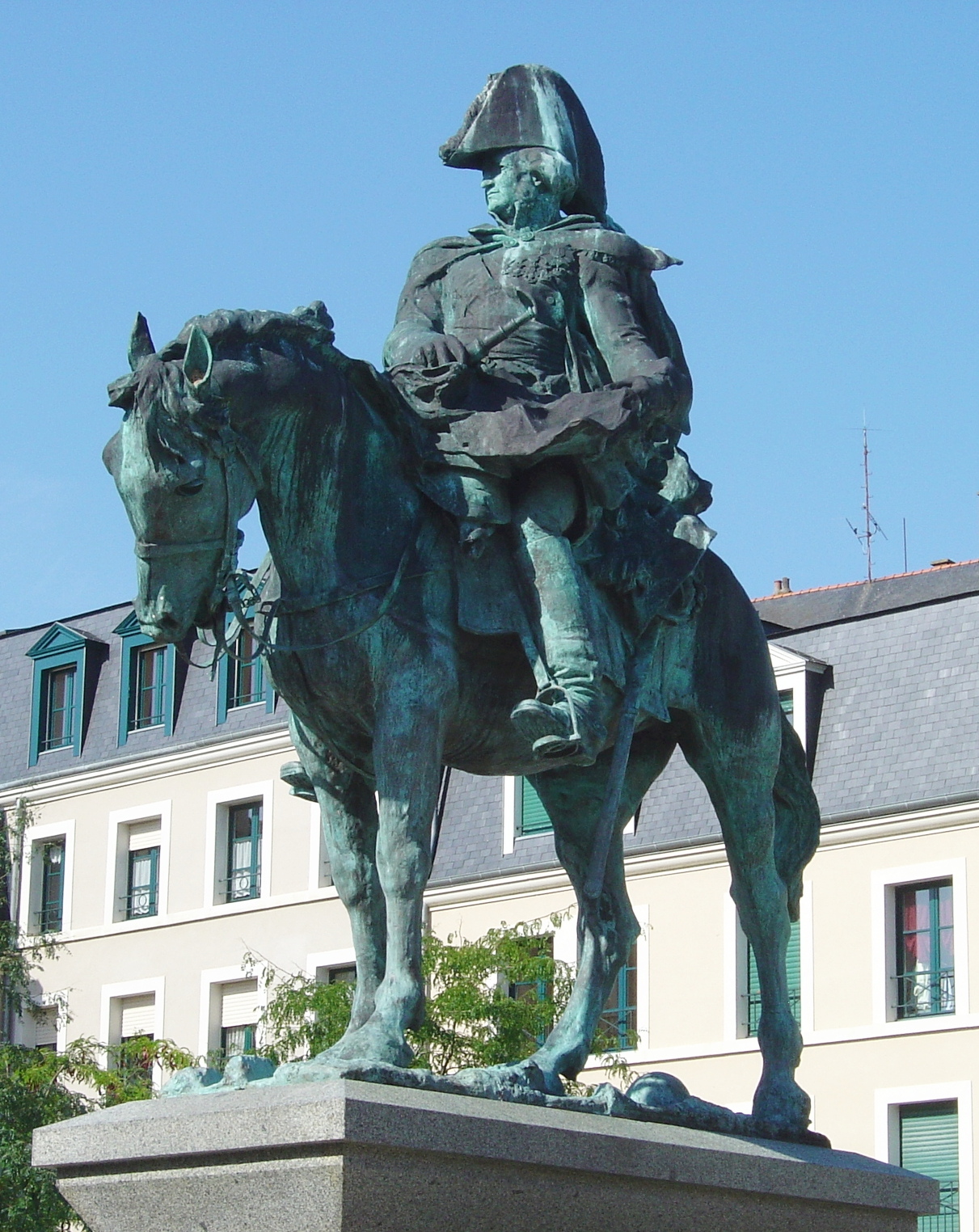
Lariboisiere in Fougères

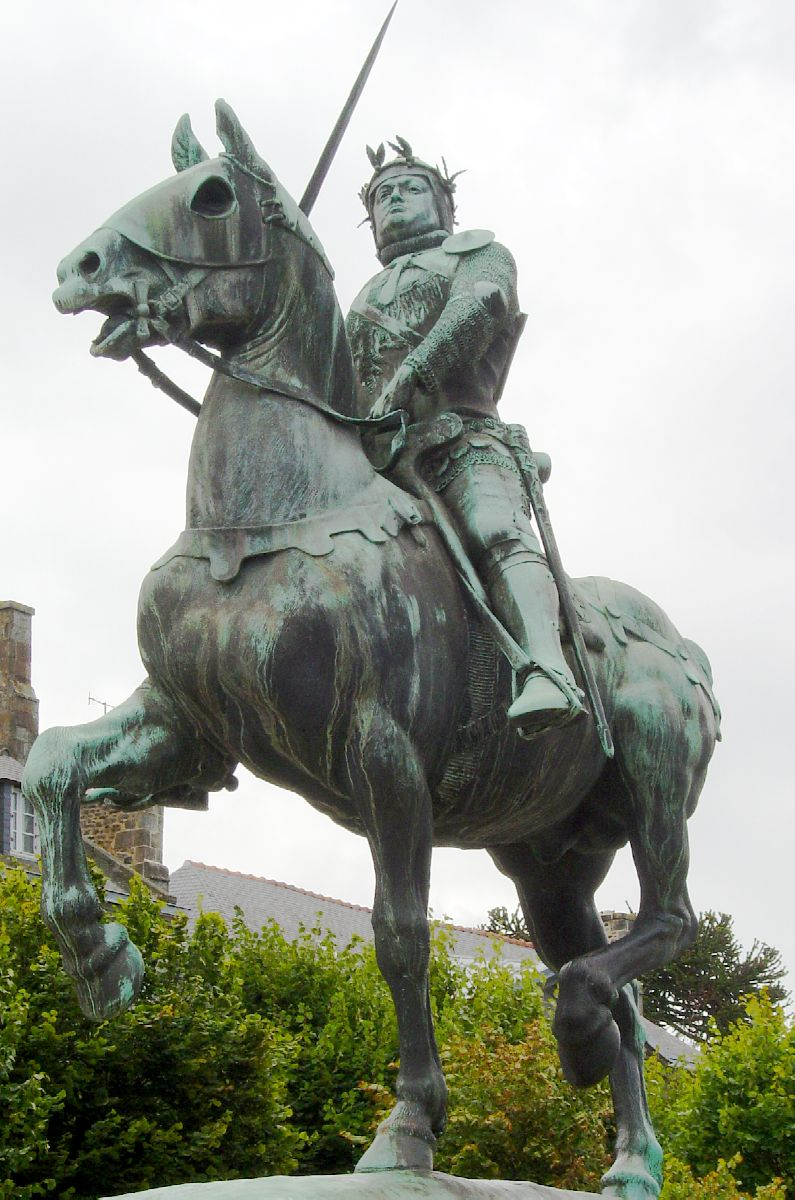
Bertrand du Guesclin in Dinan

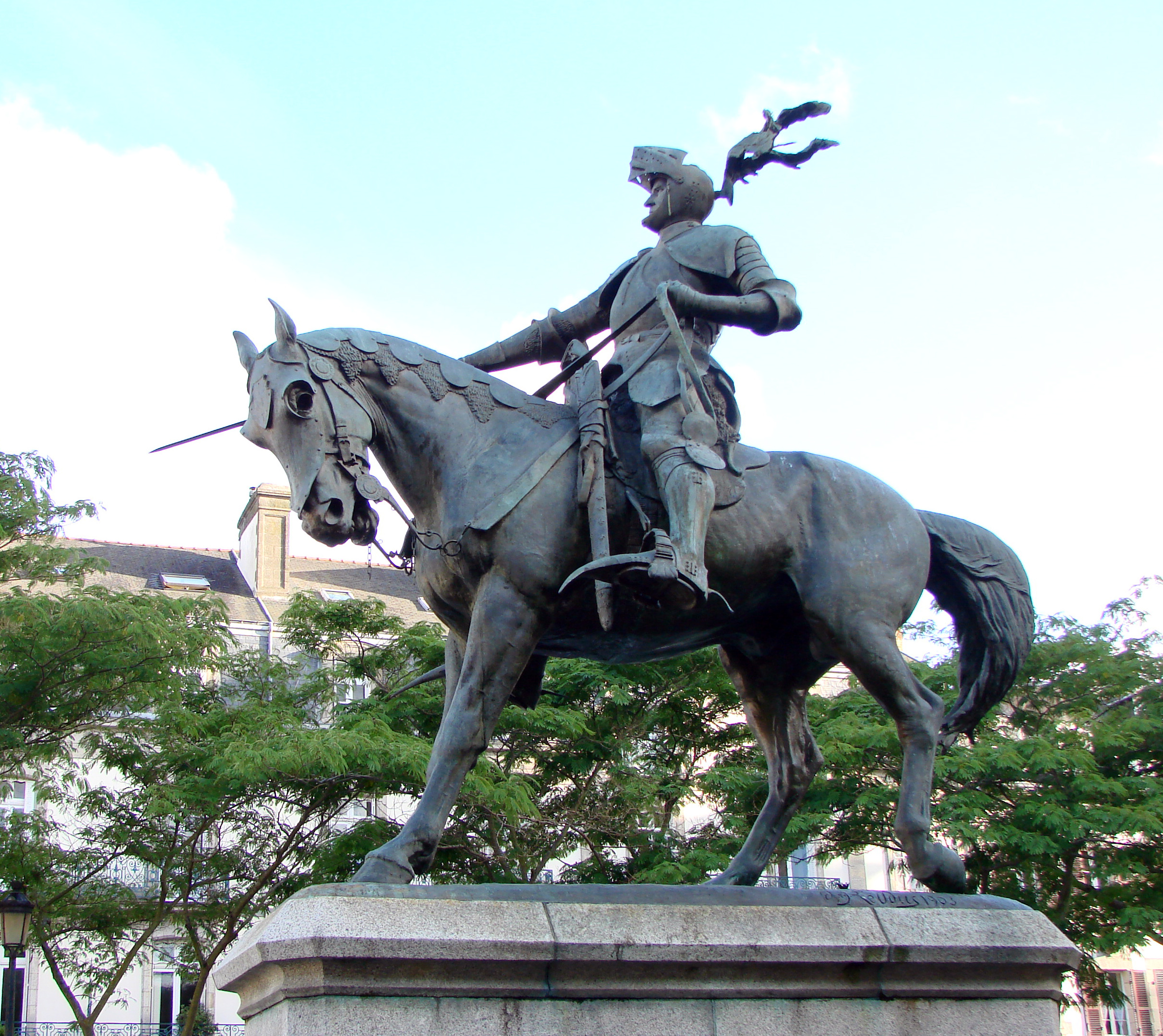
Arthur III in Vannes

== Centre-Val-de-Loire ==
- Joan of Arc on place du Martroi in Orléans, by Denis Foyatier (1855)
- Louis XII above the portal of the Château de Blois, by Charles Émile Seurre (1857), replacing destroyed predecessor of 1507
- Joan of Arc in Chinon, by Jules Roulleau (1893)
- Joan of Arc in Blois, by Anna Hyatt Huntington (1921)
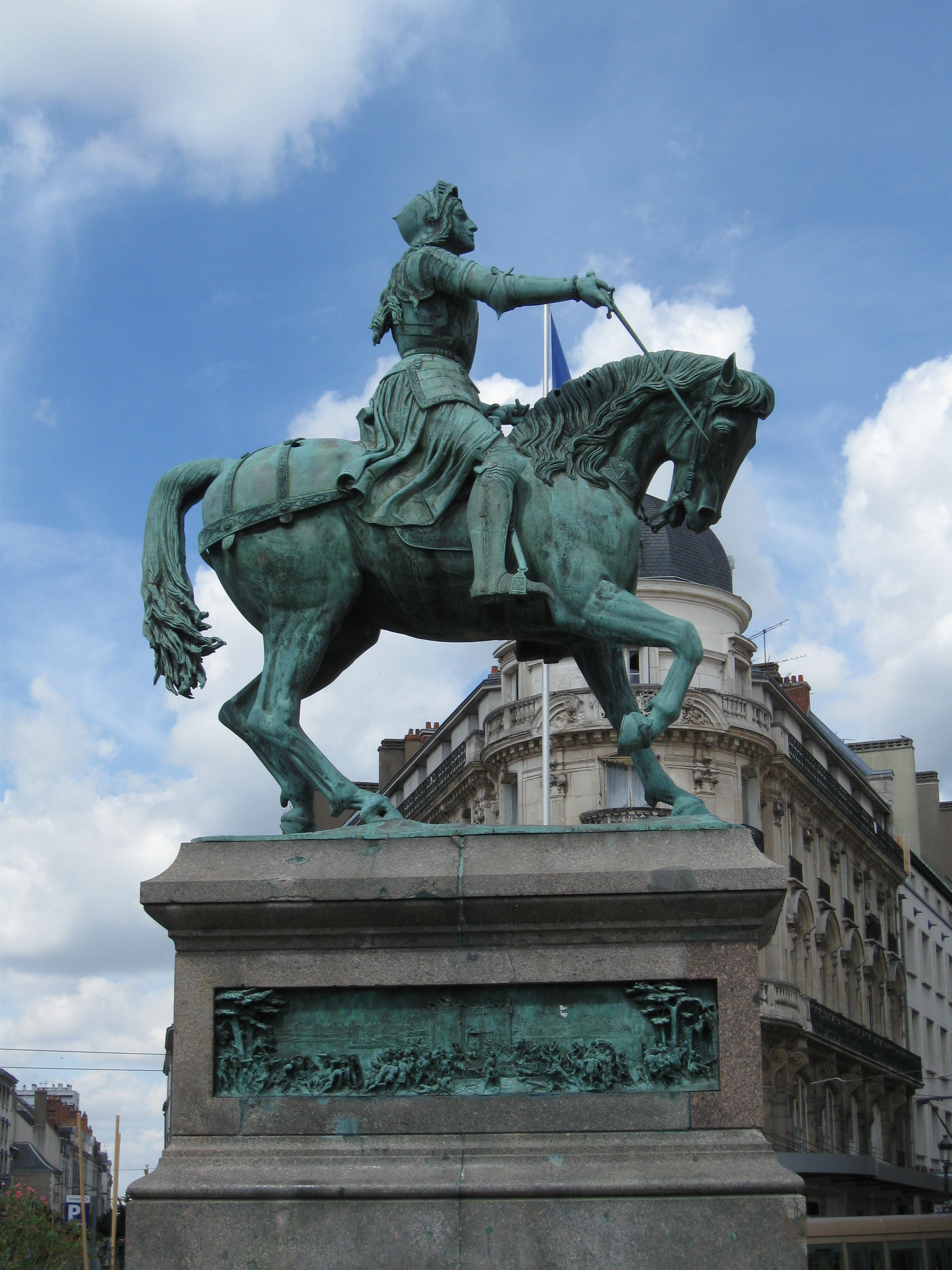
Joan of Arc in Orléans

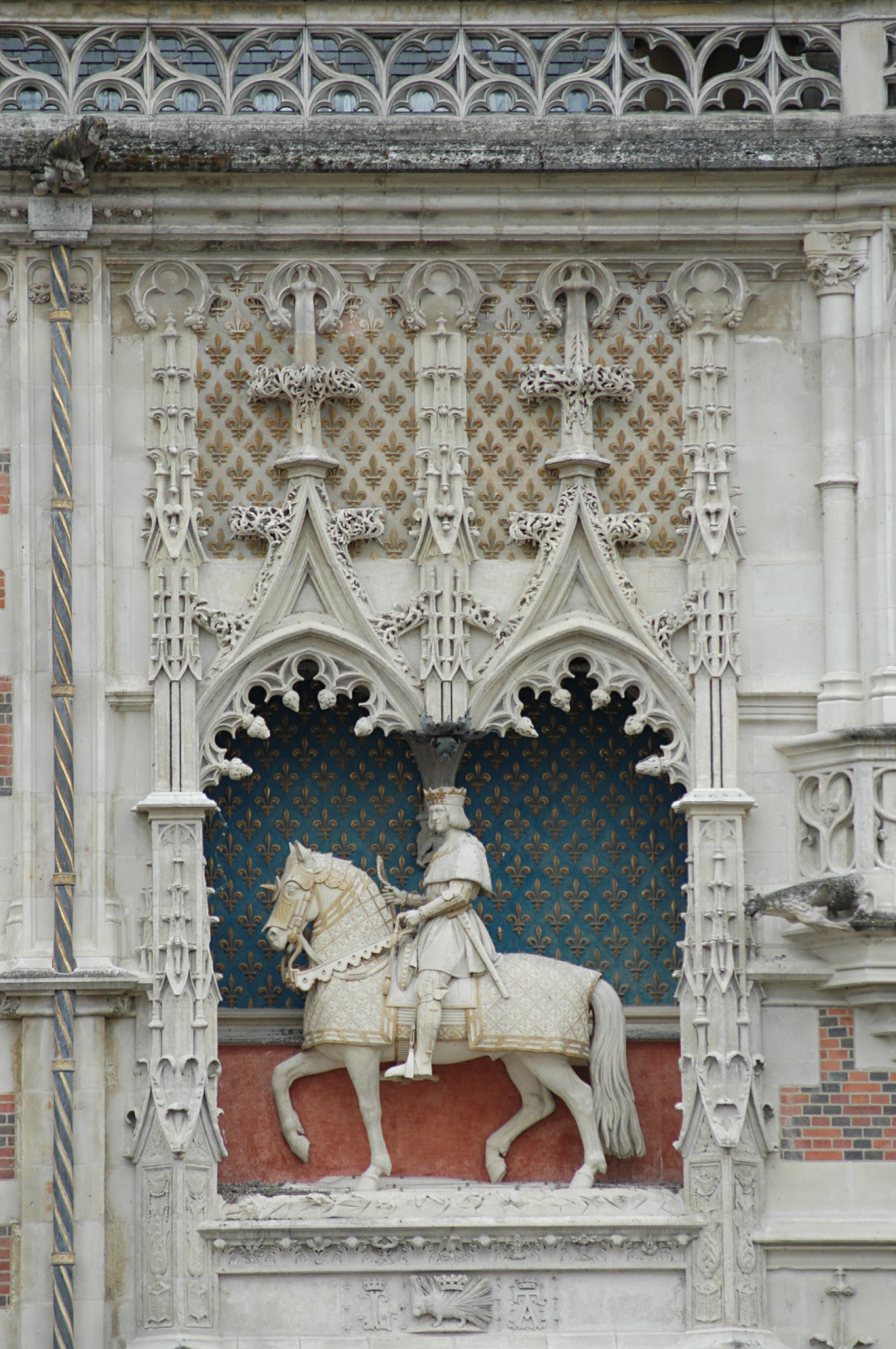
Louis XII, Château de Blois

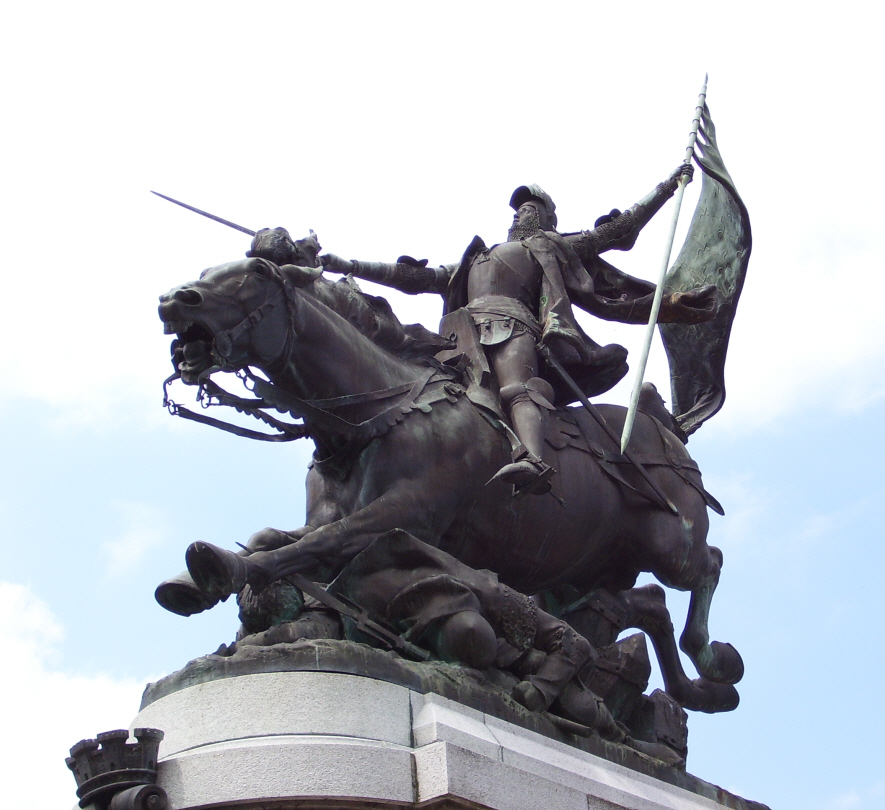
Joan of Arc in Chinon

== Corse ==
- Napoleon and his brothers in Ajaccio, by Antoine-Louis Barye (1865), relocated to nearby site in 1969
- Vincentello d'Istria in Biguglia, by Cesare Rabiti (2009)

== Grand Est ==
- Louis XIII on the façade of the Hôtel de Ville in Reims, by François Milhomme (1818), stone replacement of destroyed bronze predecessor of 1624
- Louis XIV on the façade of Strasbourg Cathedral, by Jean Vallastre (1823); other equestrian statues on the Cathedral exterior by unidentified authors, including those replacing destroyed medieval predecessors representing Clovis, Dagobert, and Rudolf of Habsburg
- Duke Antoine of Lorraine above the main gate of the Palais ducal of Nancy, by Giorné Viard (1851), replacing destroyed predecessor of 1512
- René II, Duke of Lorraine at Place Saint-Epvre, Nancy, by Mathias Schiff (1883)
- Joan of Arc at Place Jeanne D'Arc, Nancy, by Emmanuel Frémiet (1889), reworked from the earlier Paris version
- Le Veneur in front of Château Perrier in Épernay, by Pierre Le Nordez (1890)
- Antoine de Lasalle in Lunéville, by Henri-Louis Cordier (1892)
- Joan of Arc at Place du Parvis, Reims, by Paul Dubois (1896), new cast of the Paris version, erected in 1900
- Joan of Arc in Mirecourt, by Emmanuel Frémiet (1903), new cast of the Paris version
- Joan of Arc at the Ballon d'Alsace, by Mathurin Moreau and Pierre Le Nordez (1906), new cast of the Montebourg version
- Joan of Arc in Strasbourg, by Paul Dubois (1897), new cast of the Paris version first erected in front of the Palais du Rhin in 1920, relocated to present site in 1965
- Joan of Arc in Gandrange, by Mathurin Moreau and Pierre Le Nordez (1921), new cast of the Montebourg version
- Joan of Arc in the military cemetery of Plaine, by Xavier Obert (1924)
- Joan of Arc in Bischoffsheim, by Paul Brutschi (1924)
- Joan of Arc in Marlenheim, by Alois Ruscher (1948)
- Joan of Arc in Vaucouleurs, by Georges Halbout (1951), initially erected near the Grande Poste in Algiers and relocated in 1966
- Lafayette in Metz, by Claude Goutin (2004), replacing a recast of Bartlett's Paris statue erected in 1920 and destroyed by German occupation forces in World War II
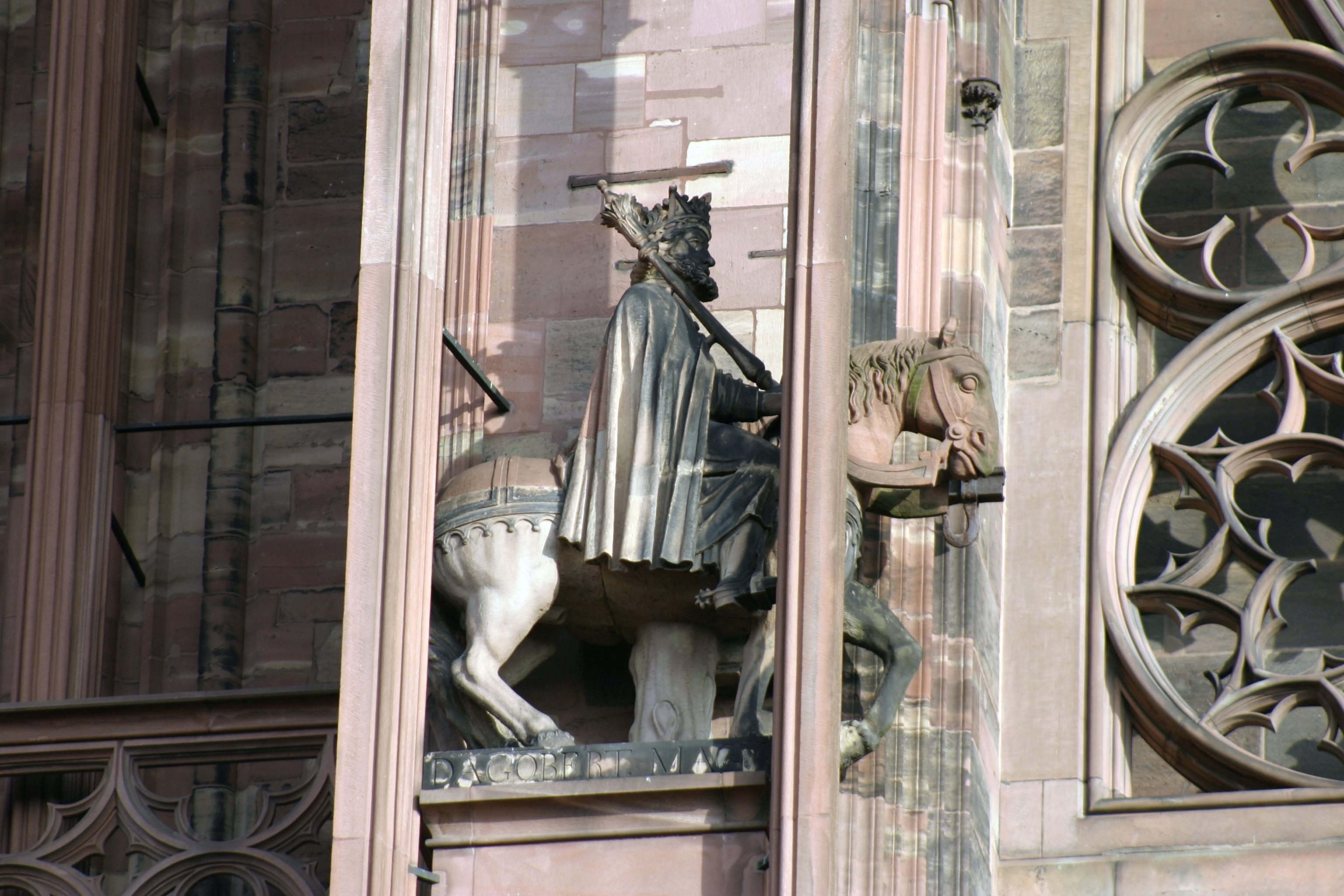
Dagobert in Strasbourg

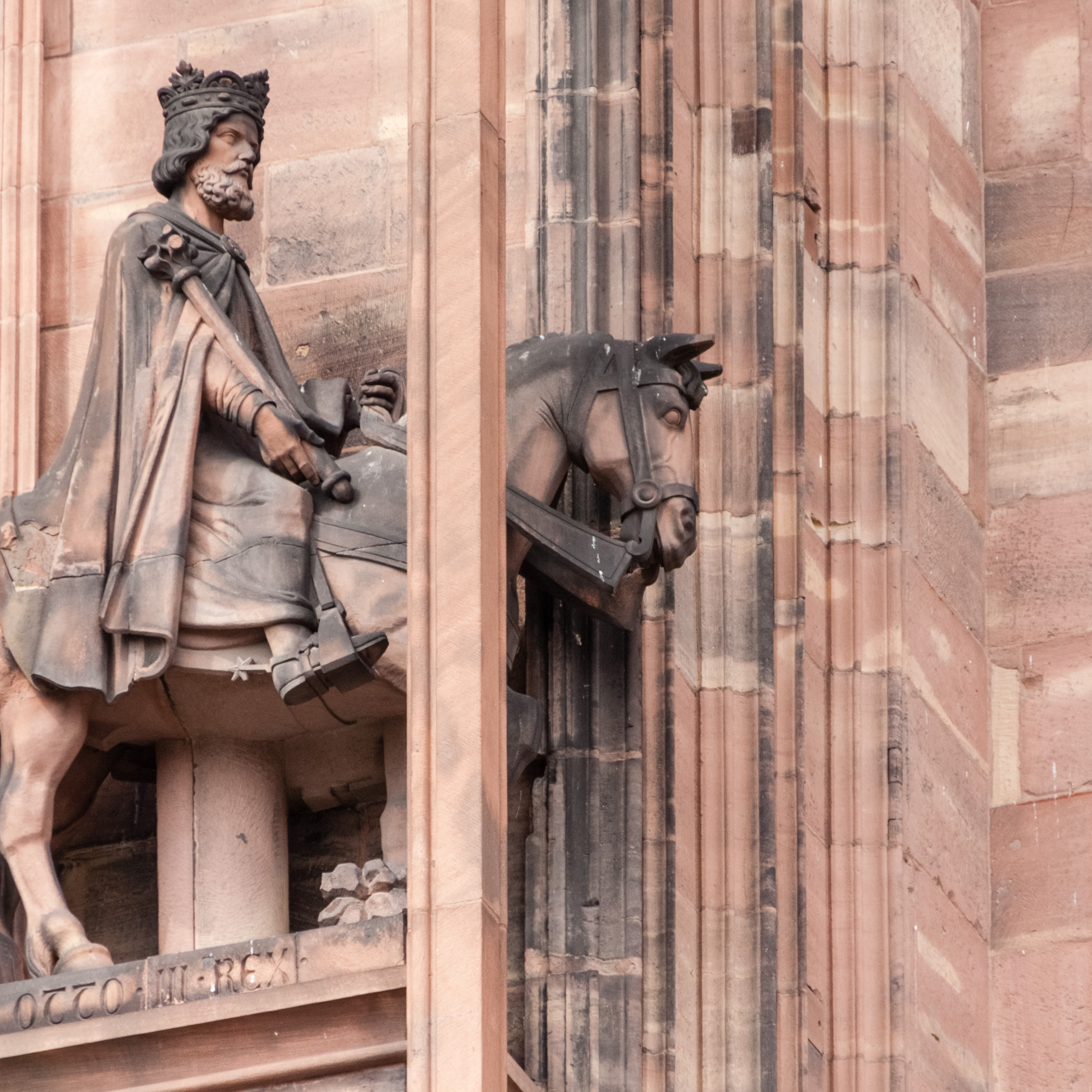
Otto III in Strasbourg

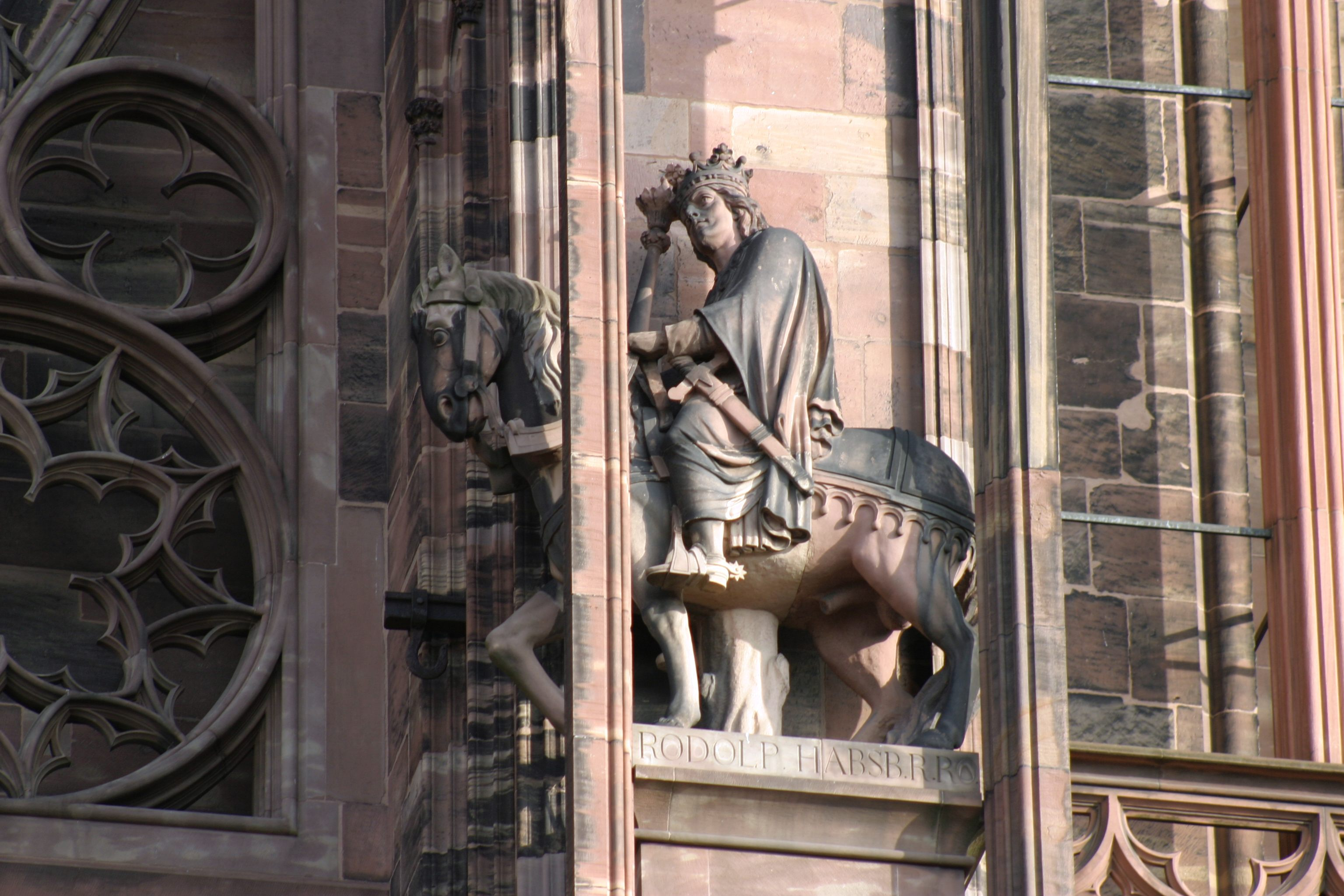
Rudolph of Habsburg in Strasbourg

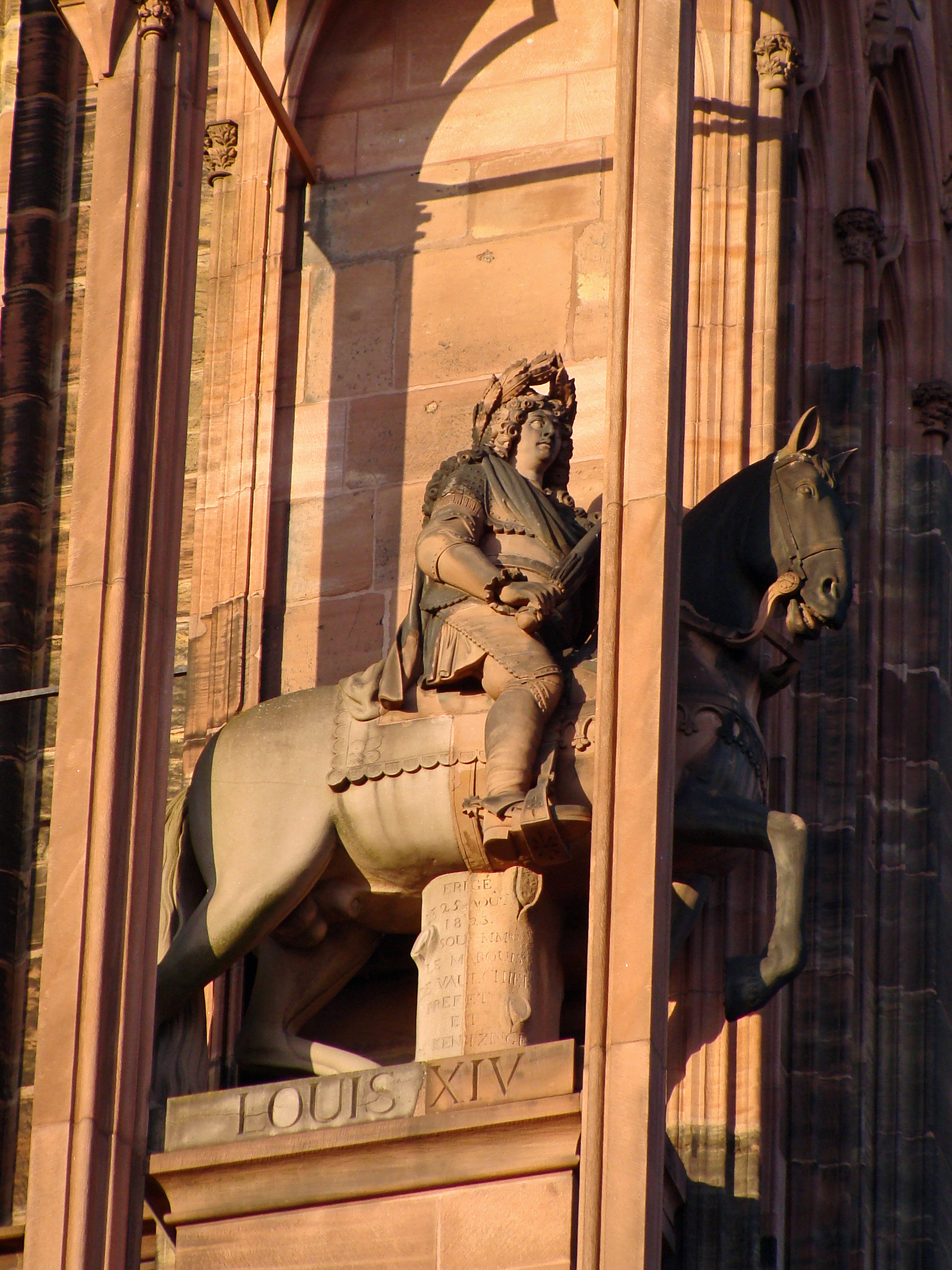
Louis XIV in Strasbourg

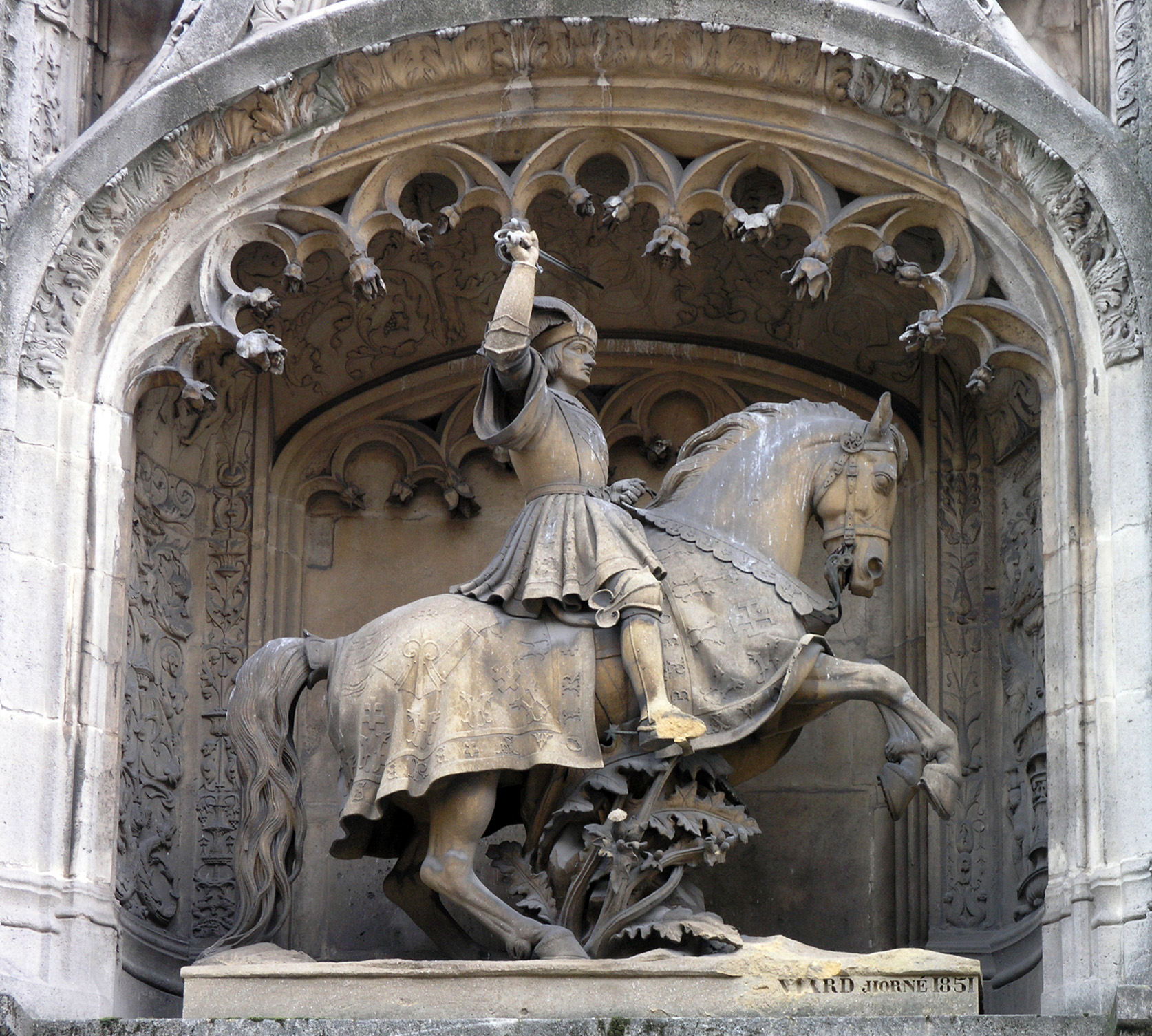
Duke Antoine of Lorraine in Nancy

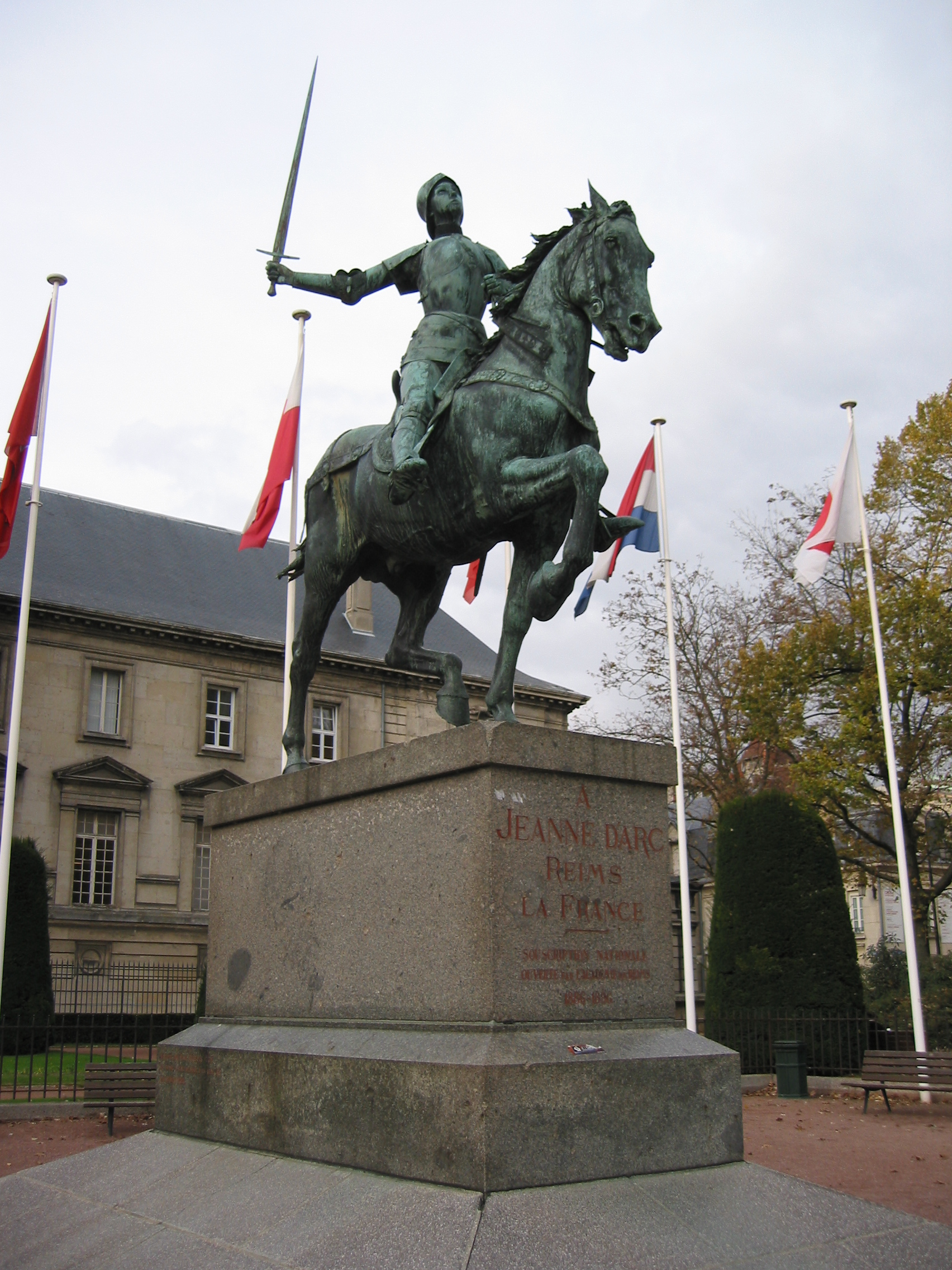
Joan of Arc in Reims

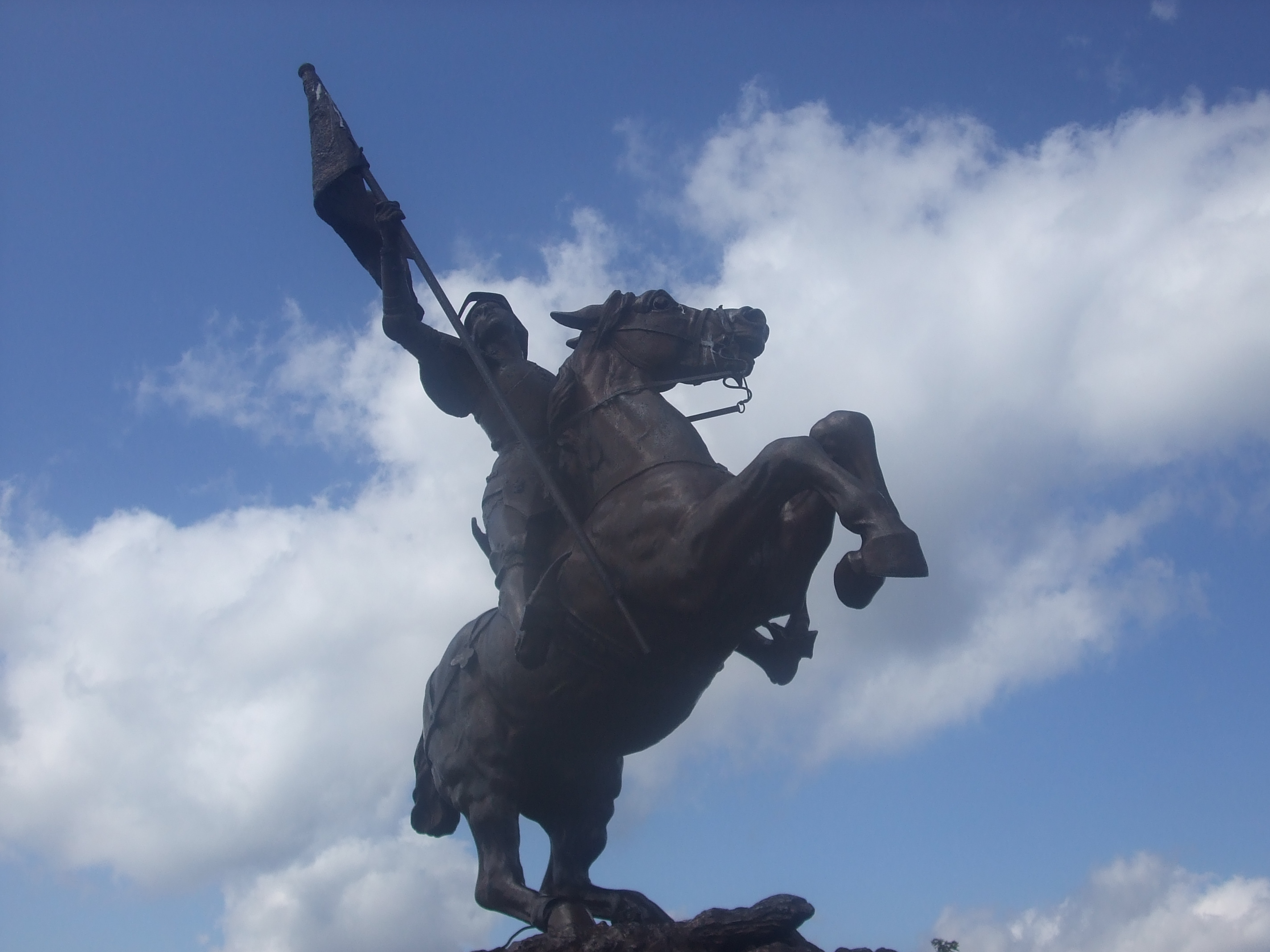
Joan of Arc on the Ballon d'Alsace

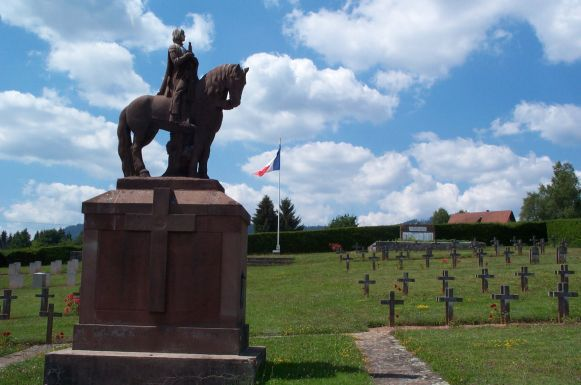
Joan of Arc in Plaine

== Hauts-de-France ==
- Louis I, Duke of Orléans in the Château de Pierrefonds, by Emmanuel Frémiet (1869)
- Louis Faidherbe in Lille, by Antonin Mercié (1896)
- José de San Martín in Boulogne-sur-Mer, by Henri Allouard (1909)
- Joan of Arc in Lille, by Emmanuel Frémiet (1912), new cast of the Paris version, stolen in 1918 and replaced in 1925
- Claude Louis Hector de Villars in Denain, by Henri Gauquié (1913), destroyed in 1918 and recast in 1922
- Joan of Arc in Compiègne, by Emmanuel Frémiet (1930), new cast of the Paris version
- Ferdinand Foch in Cassel, by Georges Malissard (1928)
- Douglas Haig in Montreuil-sur-Mer, by Paul Landowski (1931), melted by German occupation forces in 1940 and recast in 1950
- Ferdinand Foch in Lille, by Edgar-Henri Boutry (1936)
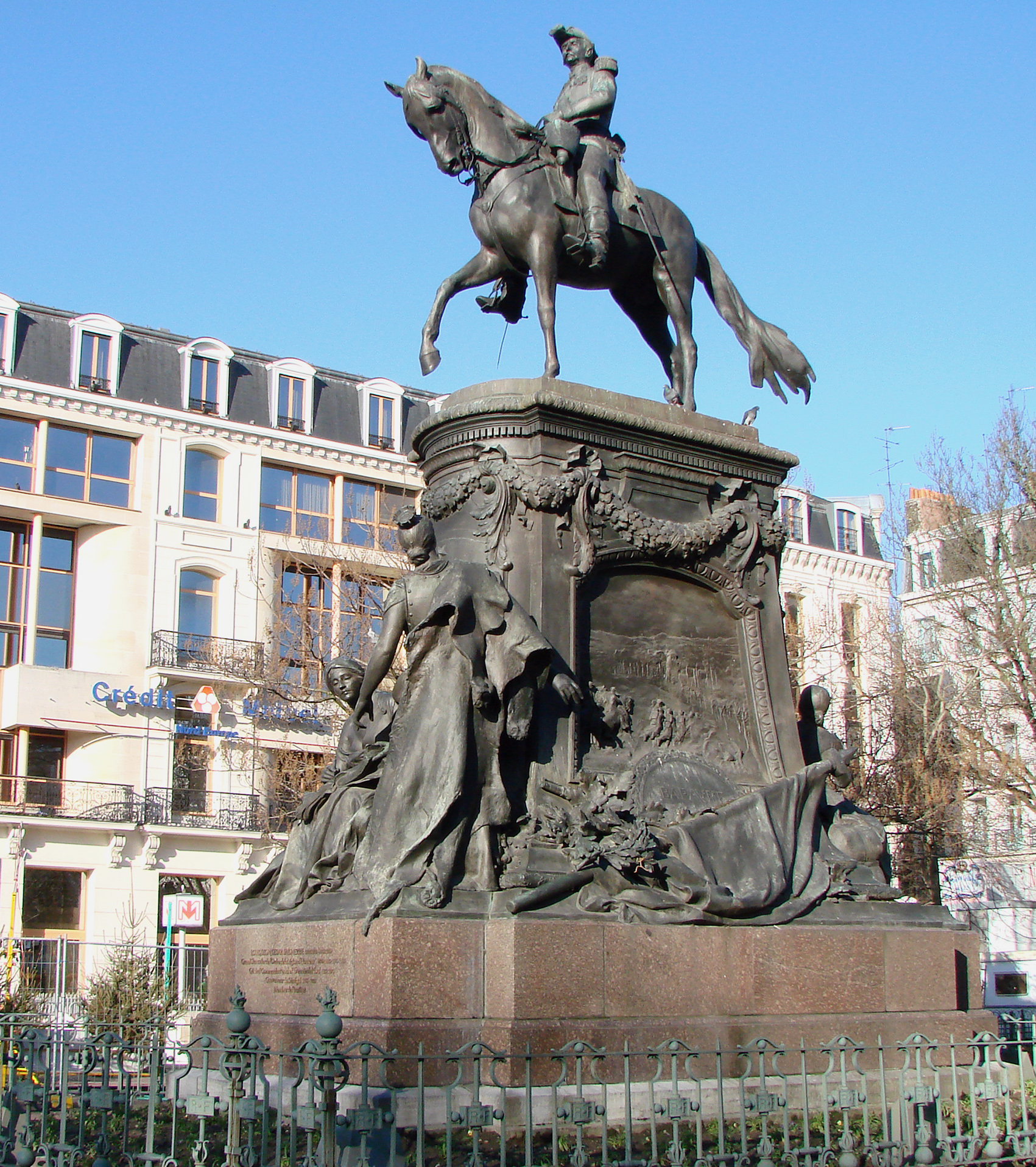
Faidherbe in Lille

== Normandie ==
- William the Conqueror in Falaise, by the brothers Louis and Charles Rochet (1851)
- Napoleon in Cherbourg-Octeville, by Armand Le Véel (1858)
- Napoleon in Rouen, by Vital Gabriel Dubray (1865)
- Joan of Arc in Montebourg, by Mathurin Moreau and Pierre Le Nordez (1899)
- Bertrand du Guesclin in Caen, by Arthur Le Duc (1905)
- Joan of Arc in Caen, by Joseph Ebstein (1931), initially erected in Oran and relocated in 1964
- Ferdinand Philippe, Duke of Orléans at the Château d'Eu, by Carlo Marochetti (1845), second cast of the version now in Neuilly-sur-Seine, initially erected in the Cour Carrée of the Louvre in Paris, relocated to Versailles in 1848 and to the present location in 1971
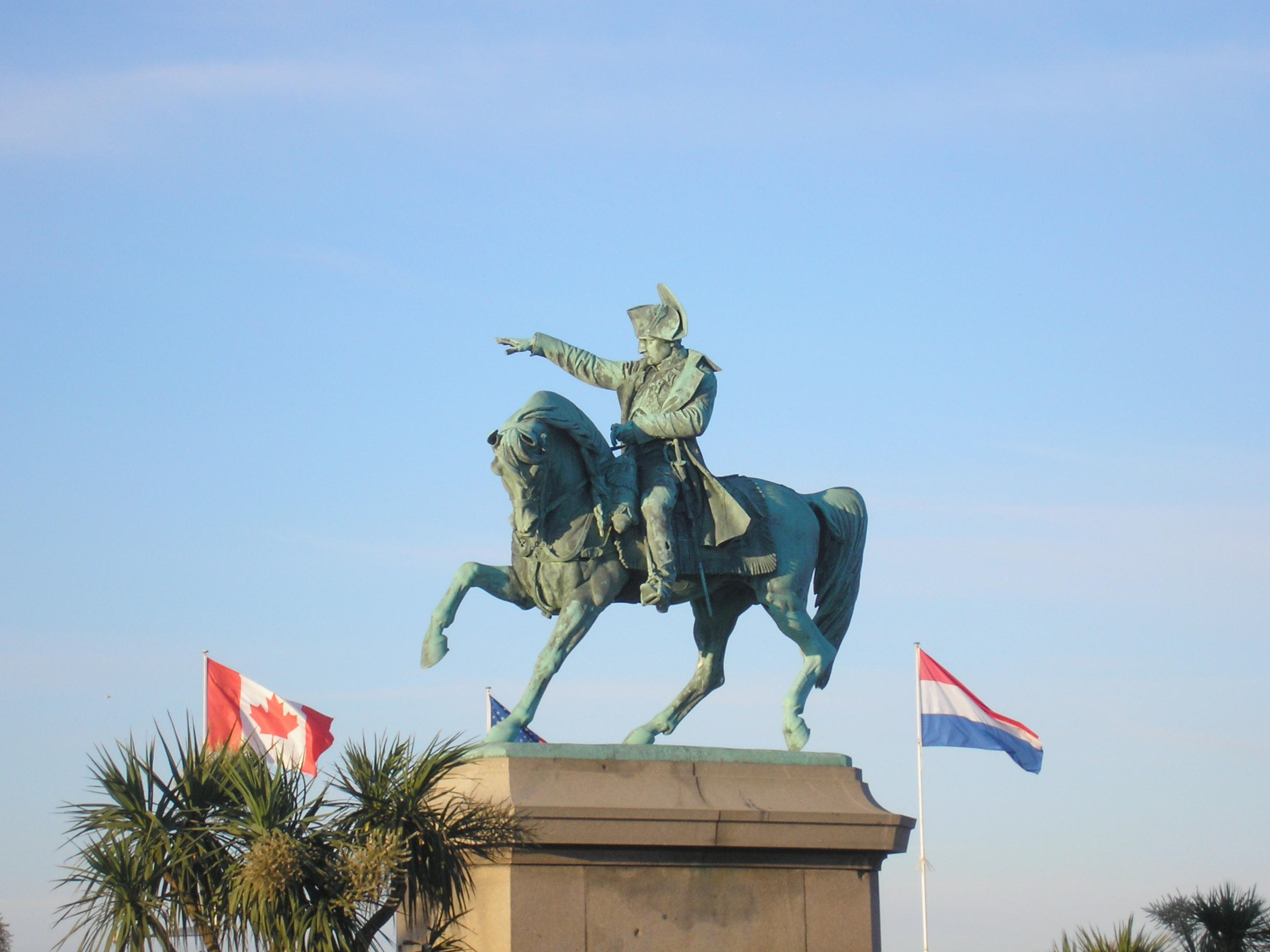
Napoleon in Cherbourg-Octeville

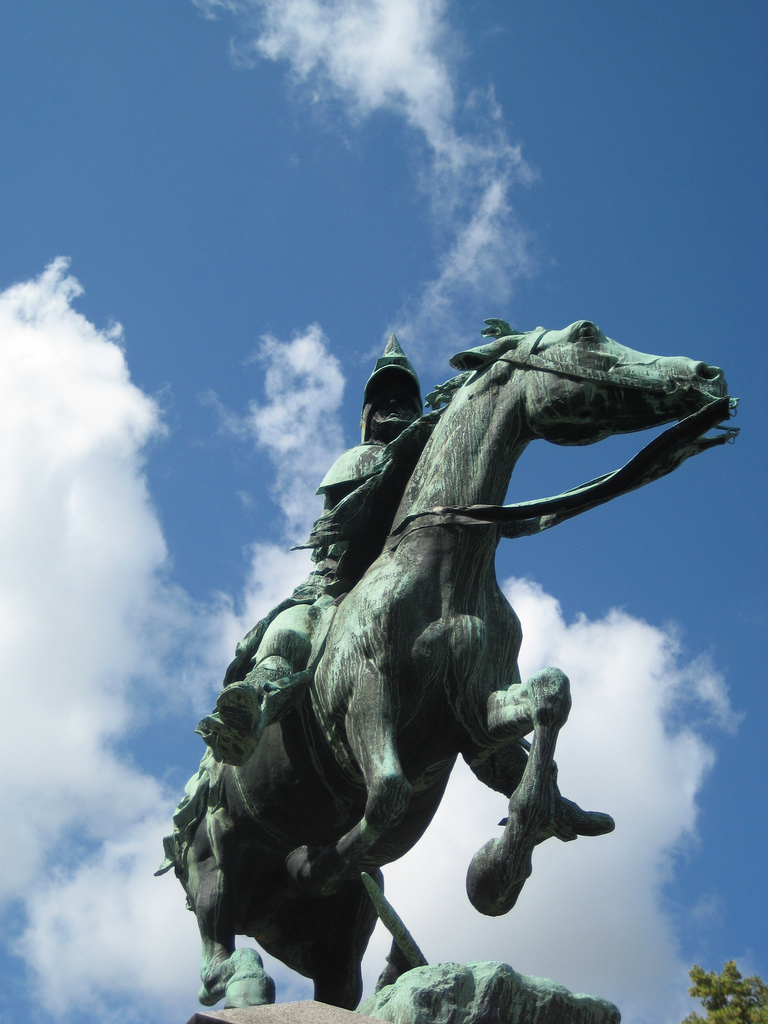
Bertrand du Guesclin in Caen

== Nouvelle-Aquitaine ==
- King Francis I in Cognac, by Antoine Étex (1864)
- Monument to the fallen in the Franco-Prussian War in Bordeaux, by Jean Georges Pierre Achard (1913)
- Joan of Arc in La Chapelle-Saint-Laurent, by Mathurin Moreau and Pierre Le Nordez (1936), new cast of the Montebourg version
- Joan of Arc in Bordeaux, by Jules Déchin (1950)
- Charles de Batz de Castelmore d'Artagnan in Lupiac, by Daphné Du Barry (2015)
- Geoffroy à la Grand Dent in Lusignan, by Jane Conil (2007)

== Occitanie ==
- Louis XIV on the Promenade du Peyrou in Montpellier, by Joseph Jan Baptiste de Bay (1838), replacing destroyed predecessor of 1718
- Joan of Arc in Castres, by Emmanuel Frémiet (1914), new cast of the Paris version
- Joan of Arc in Toulouse, by Antonin Mercié (1922)
- Joseph Joffre in Rivesaltes, by Auguste Maillard (1931)
- Ferdinand Foch in Tarbes, by Firmin Michelet (1935)
- General Édouard de Castelnau in Saint-Affrique, by Louis Chavignier (1954)
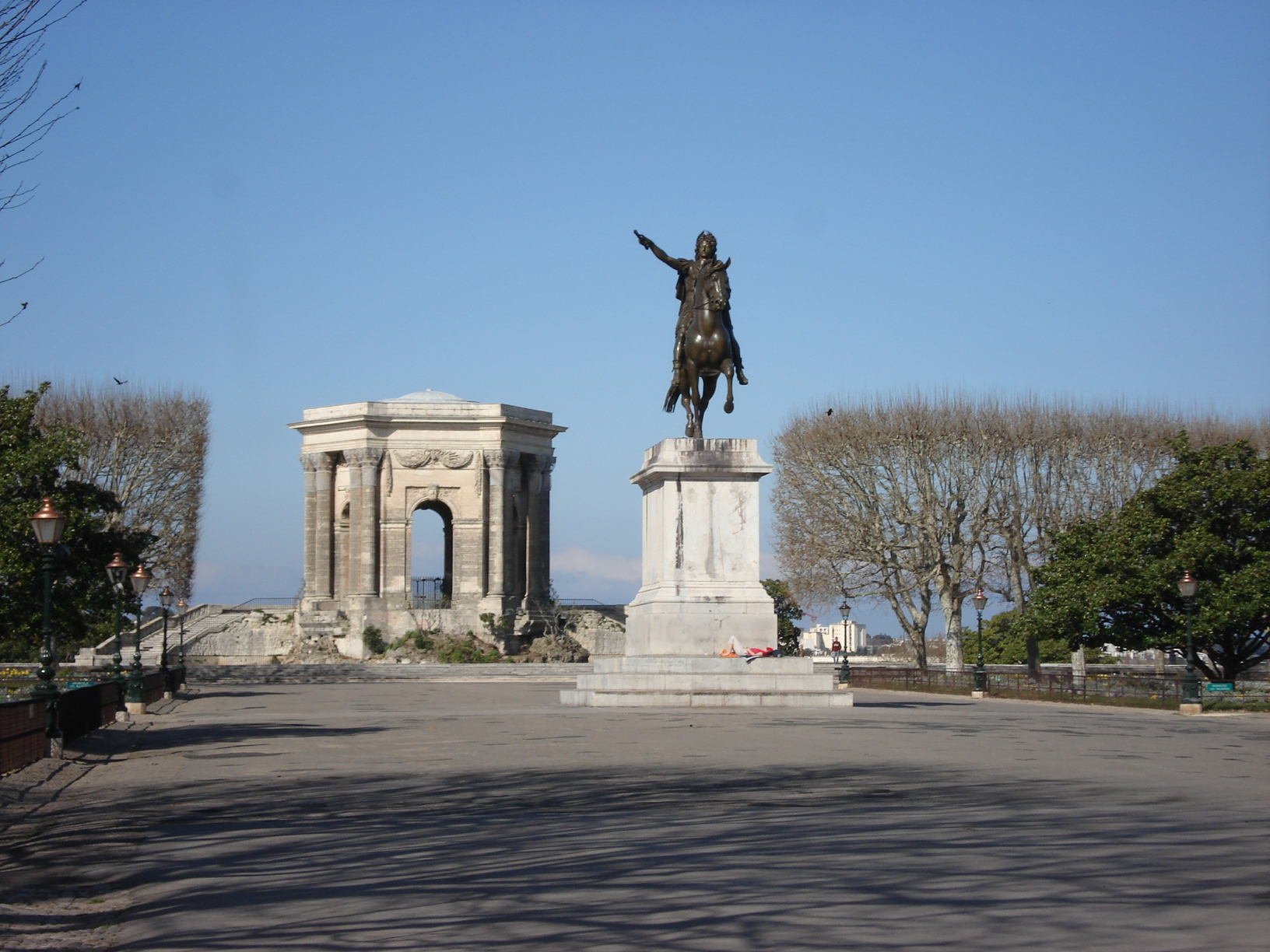
Louis XIV in Montpellier

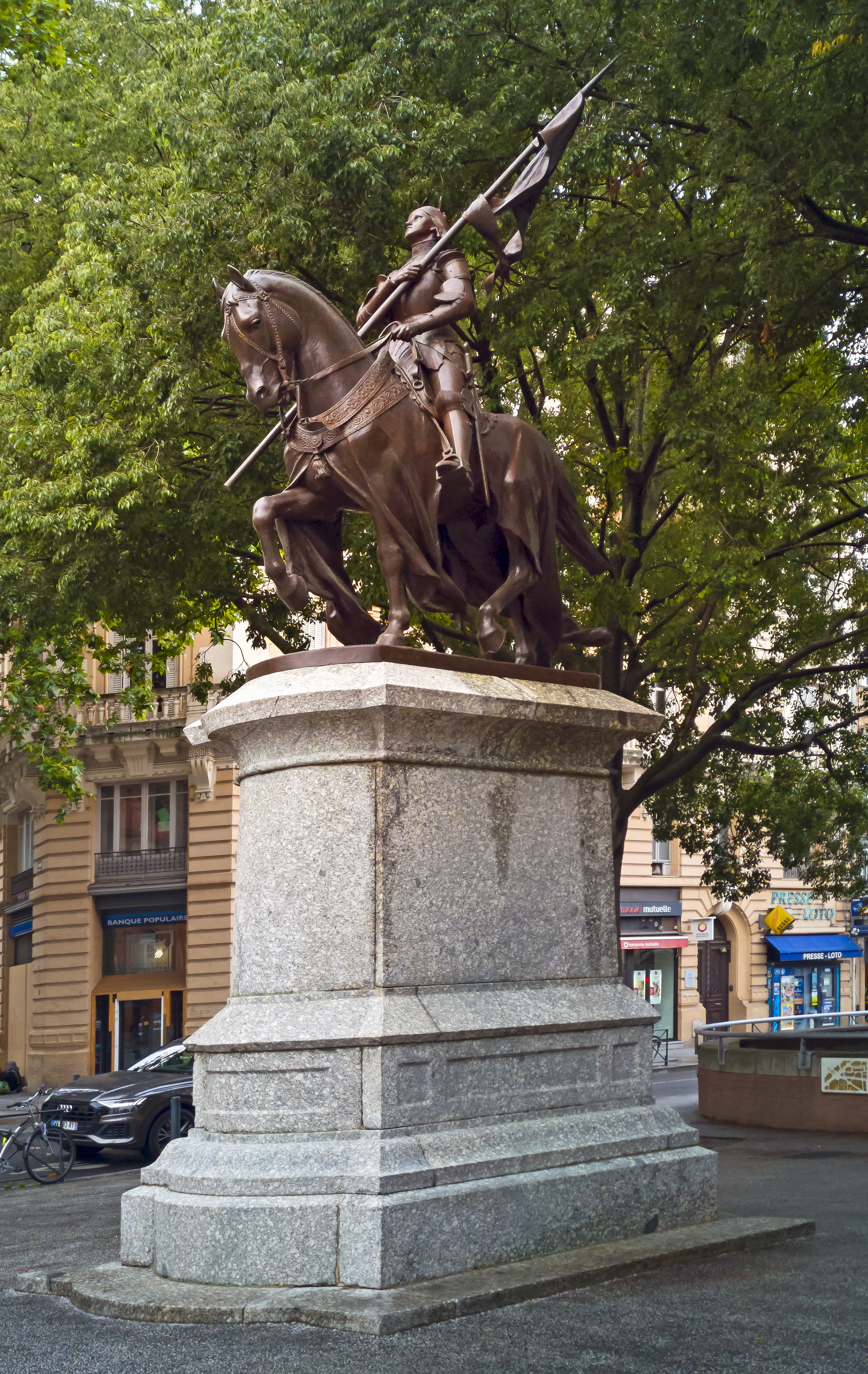
Joan of Arc in Toulouse

== Pays de la Loire ==
- Napoleon in La Roche-sur-Yon, by Émilien de Nieuwerkerke (1854), new cast of the 1852 version then in Lyon
- Joan of Arc in Nantes, by Charles-Auguste Lebourg (1904)
- Joan of Arc in Saint-Germain-sur-Moine, by Mathurin Moreau and Pierre Le Nordez (1914), new cast of the Montebourg version

== Provence-Alpes-Côte-d'Azur ==
- Joan of Arc in Rognonas, by Mathurin Moreau and Pierre Le Nordez (1924), new cast of the Montebourg version

== Disappeared statues ==
- Clovis, Dagobert, and Rudolf of Habsburg on the façade of Strasbourg Cathedral, late 13th or early 14th century, destroyed in December 1793
- Philip IV the Fair inside Notre-Dame de Paris, wood (14th century), destroyed in the early 1790s
- Charles VII above the entrance of the Palais Jacques Coeur in Bourges (c.1450), destroyed in 1792
- Louis XII above the entrance of the Château de Blois, by Guido Mazzoni (1507), destroyed in 1792
- Duke Antoine of Lorraine above the entrance of the Palais ducal in Nancy, by Mansuy Gauvin (1512), destroyed in 1792
- Henry IV on the Pont Neuf in Paris, by Giambologna and Pietro Tacca (1611), erected in 1614 and destroyed in 1792
- Louis XIII on the façade of the Hôtel de Ville in Reims, by Nicolas Jacques (1624), destroyed in 1792
- Louis XIII on Place Royale, now Place des Vosges in Paris, by Daniele da Volterra and Pierre II Biard (1639), destroyed in 1792
- Louis XIV on Place Royale, now Place de la Libération in Dijon, by Étienne Le Hongre (1690), erected in 1750 and destroyed in 1792
- Louis XIV on Place Louis-le-Grand, now Place Vendôme in Paris, by François Girardon (1699), destroyed in 1792
- Louis XIV on Place Bellecour in Lyon, by Martin Desjardins (late 17th century), erected in 1713 and destroyed in 1793
- Louis XIV on the Promenade du Peyrou in Montpellier, by Pierre Mazeline and Simon Hurtrelle (1692), erected in 1718 and destroyed in 1792
- Louis XIV on Place Royale, now Place du Parlement-de-Bretagne in Rennes, by Antoine Coysevox (1693), initially intended for Nantes, erected in 1726 and destroyed in 1793
- Louis XV on Place Royale, now Place de la Bourse in Bordeaux, by Jean-Baptiste Lemoyne, erected in 1743 and destroyed on 20 August 1792
- Louis XV on Place Louis XV, now Place de la Concorde in Paris, by Edmé Bouchardon and Jean-Baptiste Pigalle (1763), destroyed in 1792
- Napoleon I on Place Napoléon, now Place Carnot in Lyon, by Émilien de Nieuwerkerke (1852), destroyed in 1870–71
- Diego Velázquez on the Place du Louvre in Paris, by Emmanuel Frémiet (1892), relocated to the Casa de Velázquez in Madrid in the mid-1930s and destroyed during the Spanish Civil War
- Kaiser Wilhelm I on the Esplanade in Metz, by Ferdinand Freiherr von Miller (1892), destroyed in 1918
- Emperor Frederick III on Kaiserplatz, now Place Raymond-Mondon in Metz, by Franz Dorrenbach (1909), destroyed in 1918
- Kaiser Wilhelm I on Kaiserplatz, now Place de la République in Strasbourg (1911), destroyed in 1918
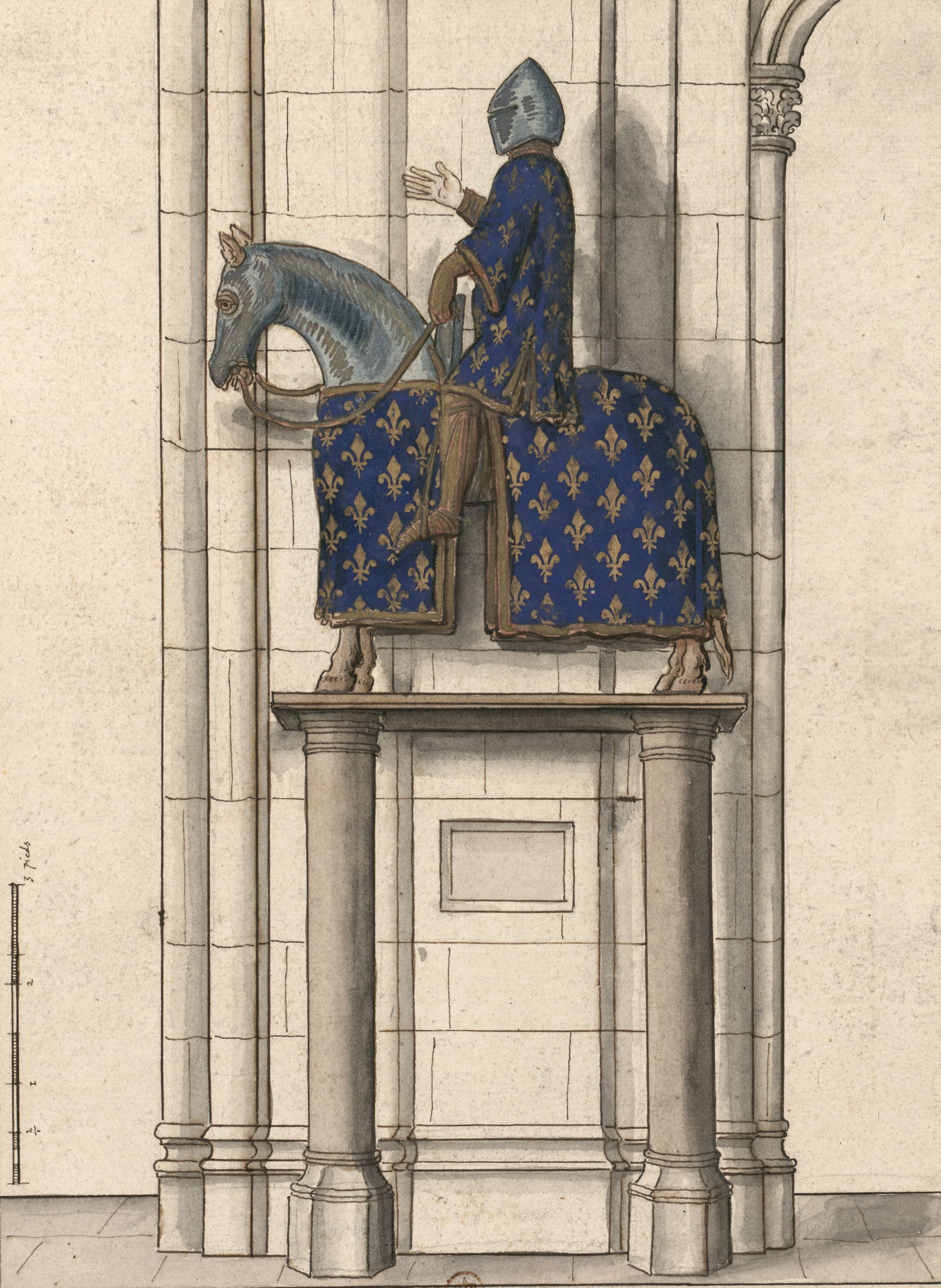
Philip the Fair's statue in Notre-Dame de Paris

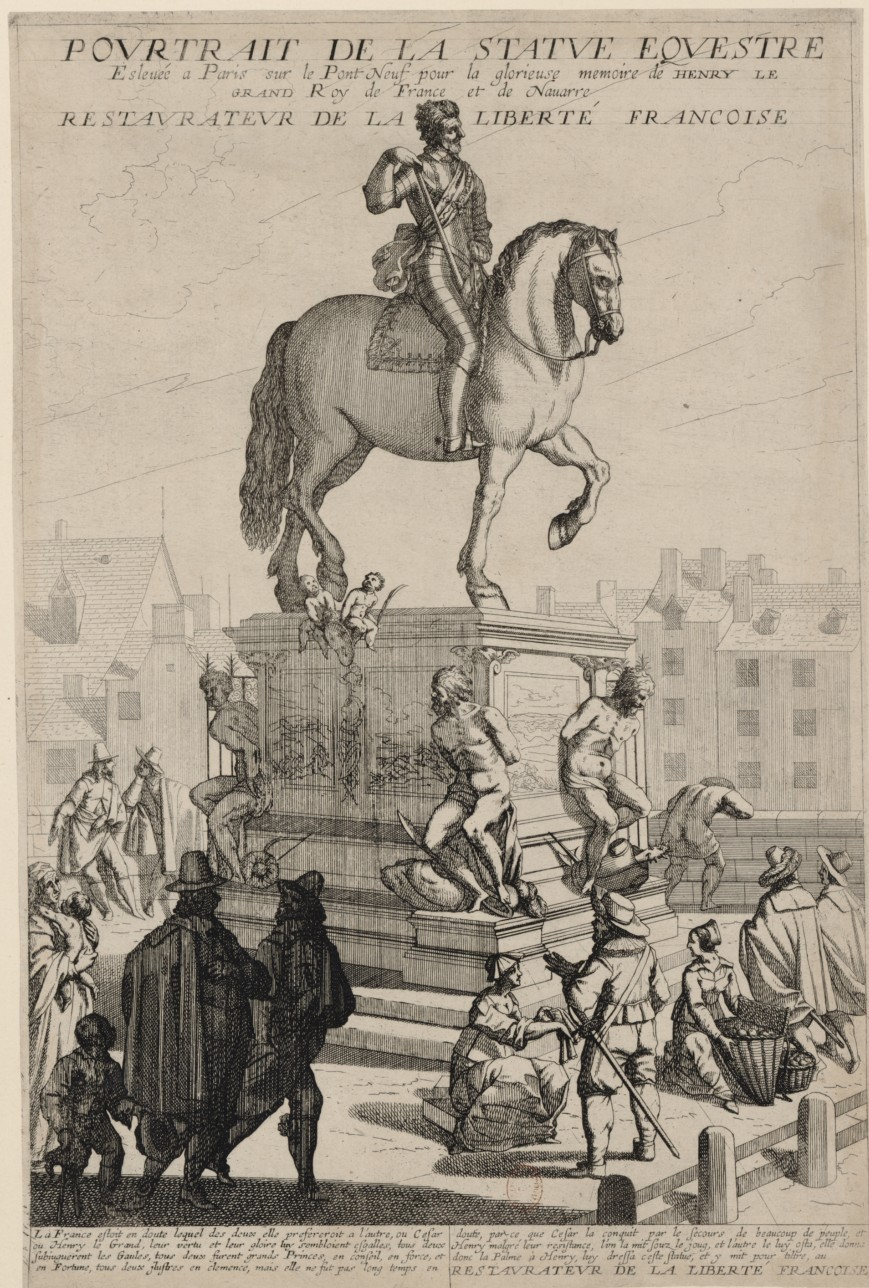
Henri IV's statue on the Pont-Neuf in Paris, engraving c.1630

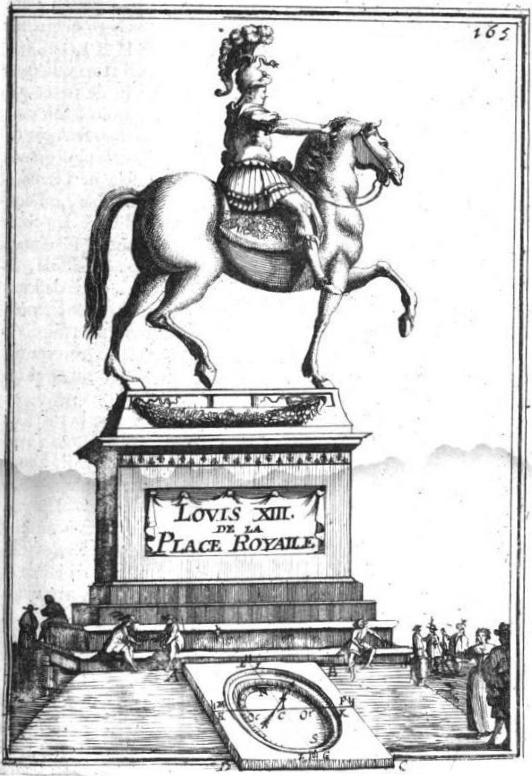
Louis XIII on Place Royale in Paris, engraving by Alain Manesson Mallet, 1702

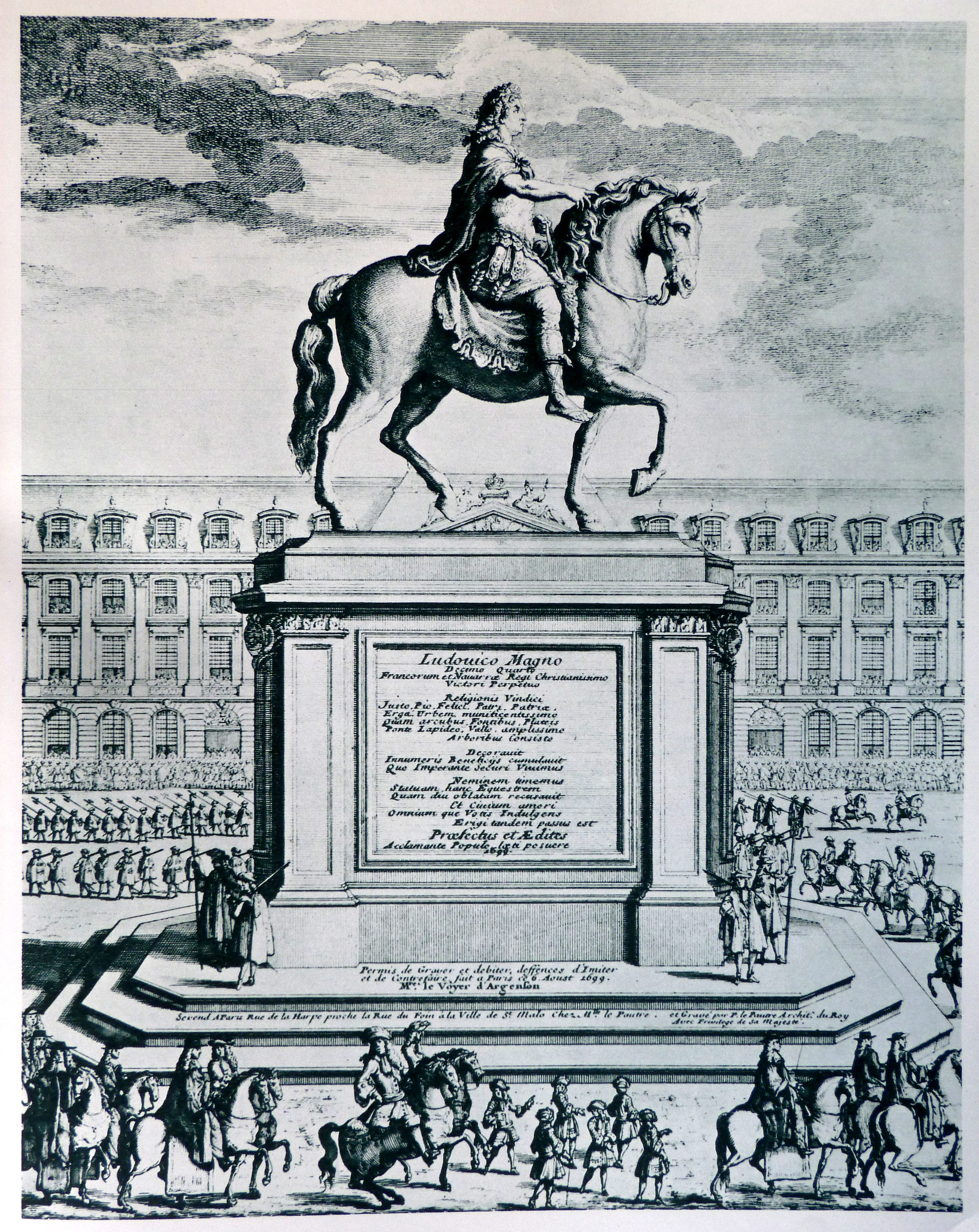
Louis XIV on Place Louis-le-Grand in Paris, engraving by Pierre Lepautre, c.1700

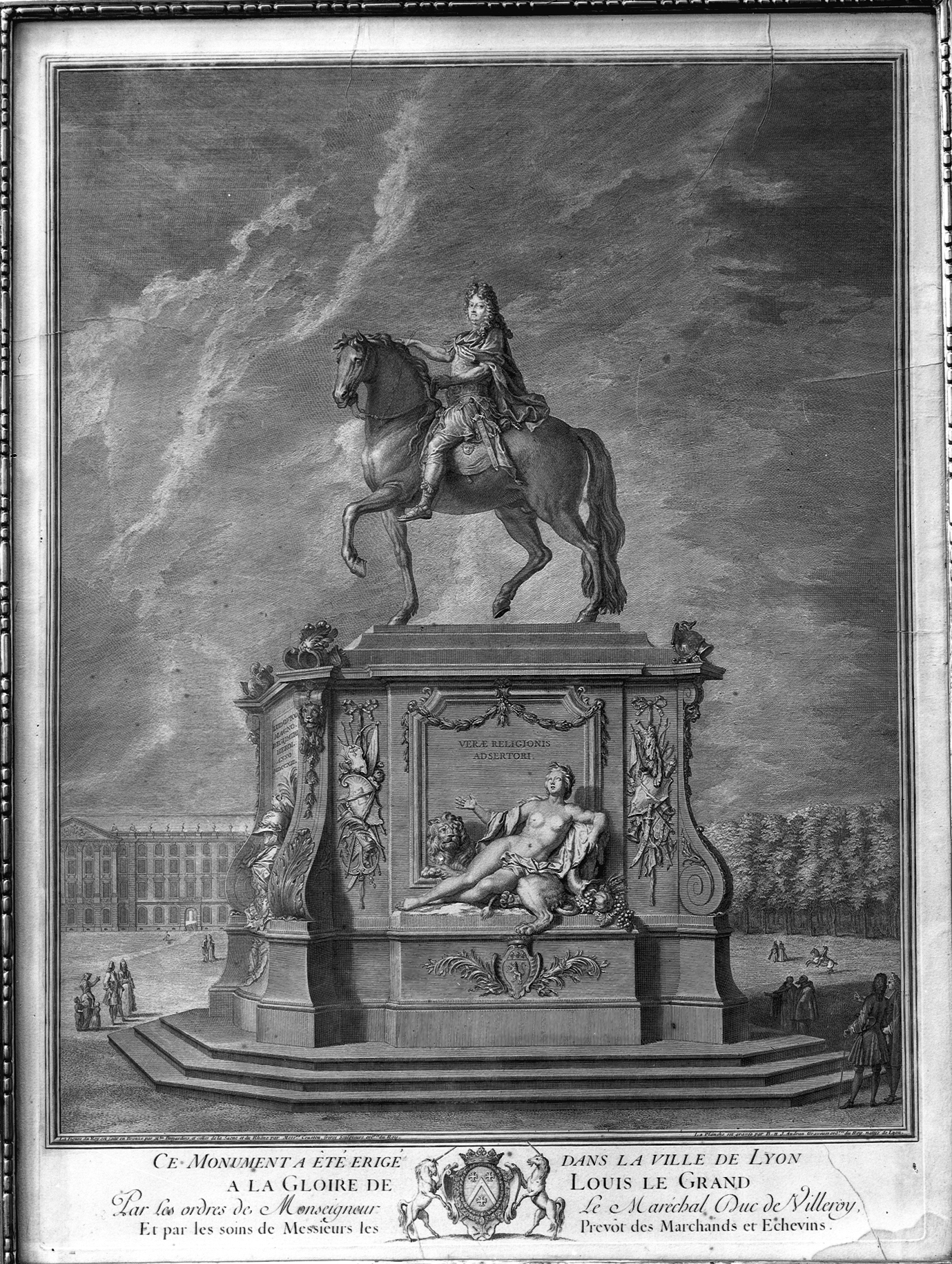
Louis XIV in Lyon, by Jean Audran, 18th century

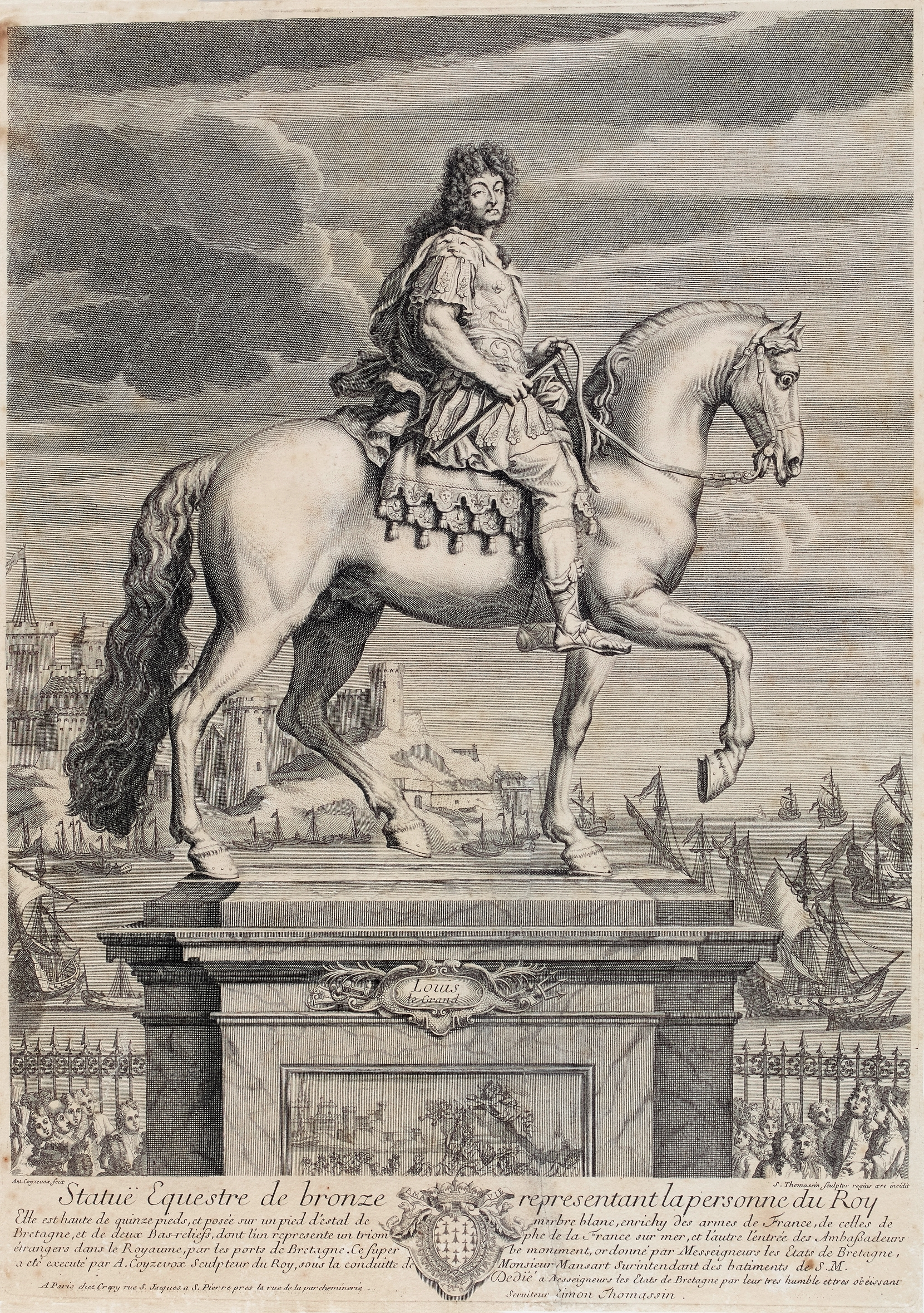
Louis XIV in Rennes, engraving by Simon Thomassin, 1699

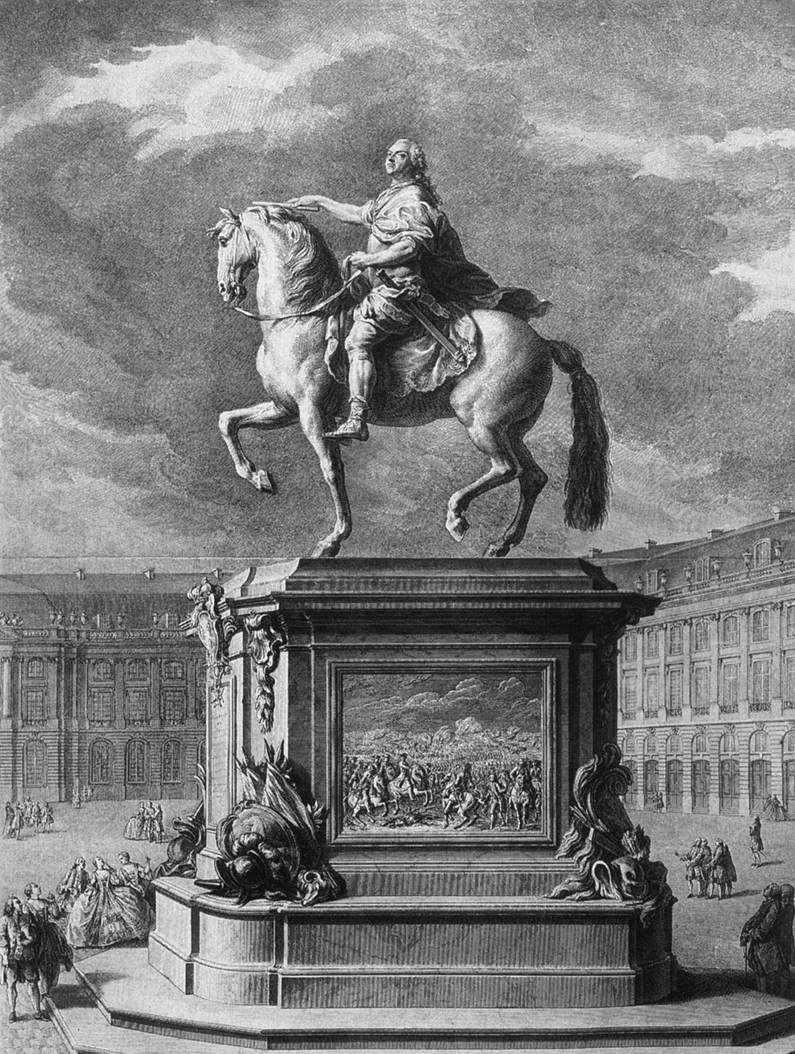
Louis XV in Bordeaux, engraving by Nicolas-Gabriel Dupuis, 1743

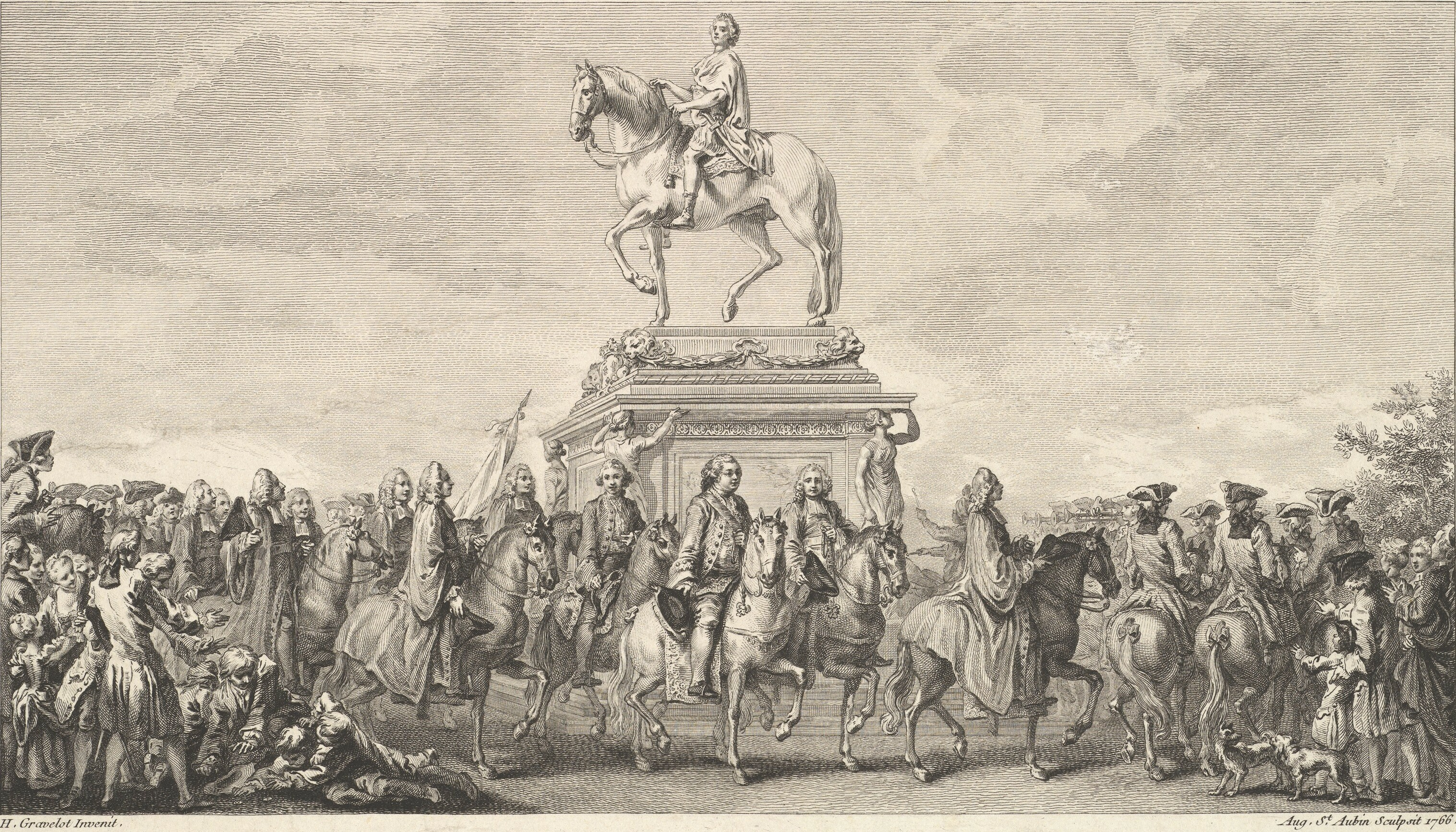
Louis XV on Place Louis XV in Paris, engraving by Augustin de Saint-Aubin after Hubert-François Gravelot, 1766

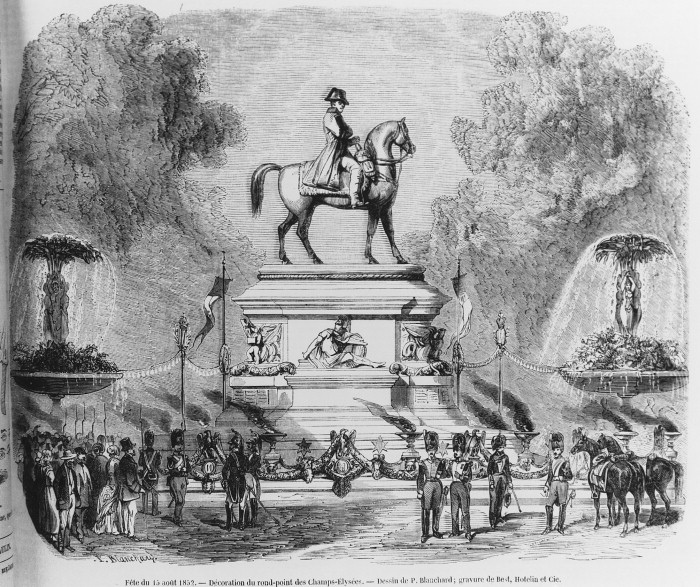
Nieuwerkerke's Napoleon exhibited on the rond-point des Champs-Élysées in Paris before its erection in Lyon, 1852

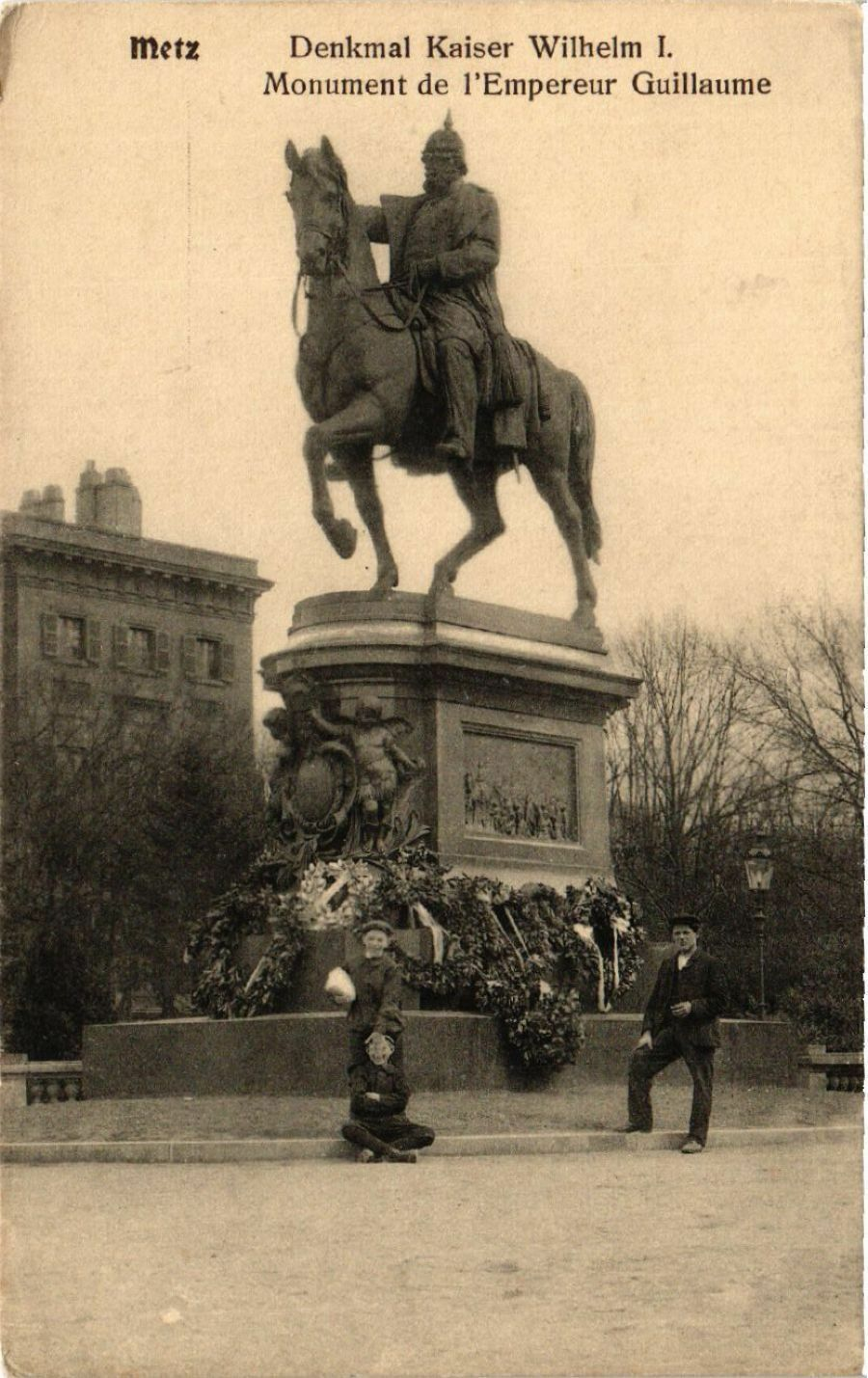
William I in Metz, 1905 postcard

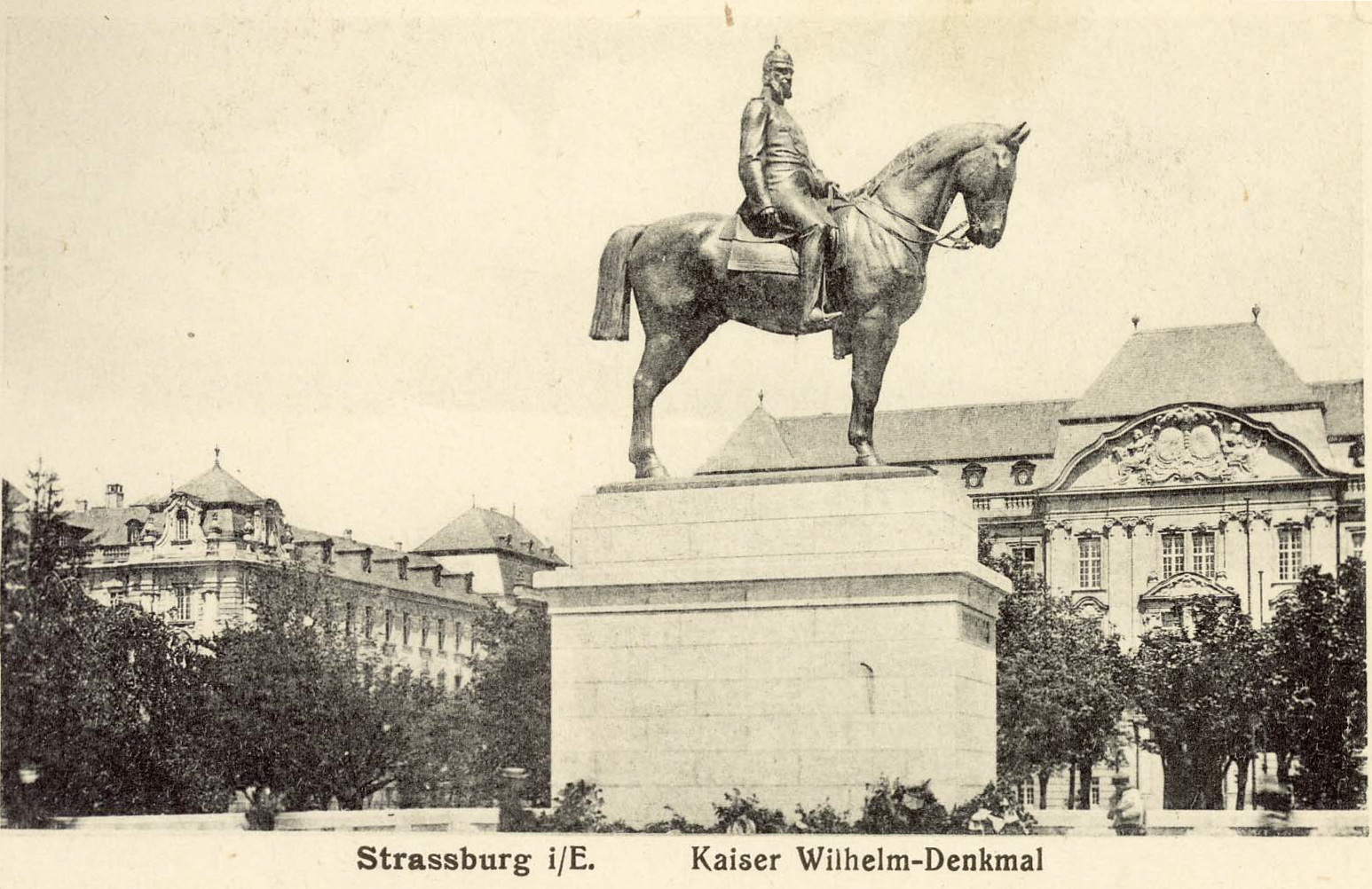
William I in Strasbourg, postcard

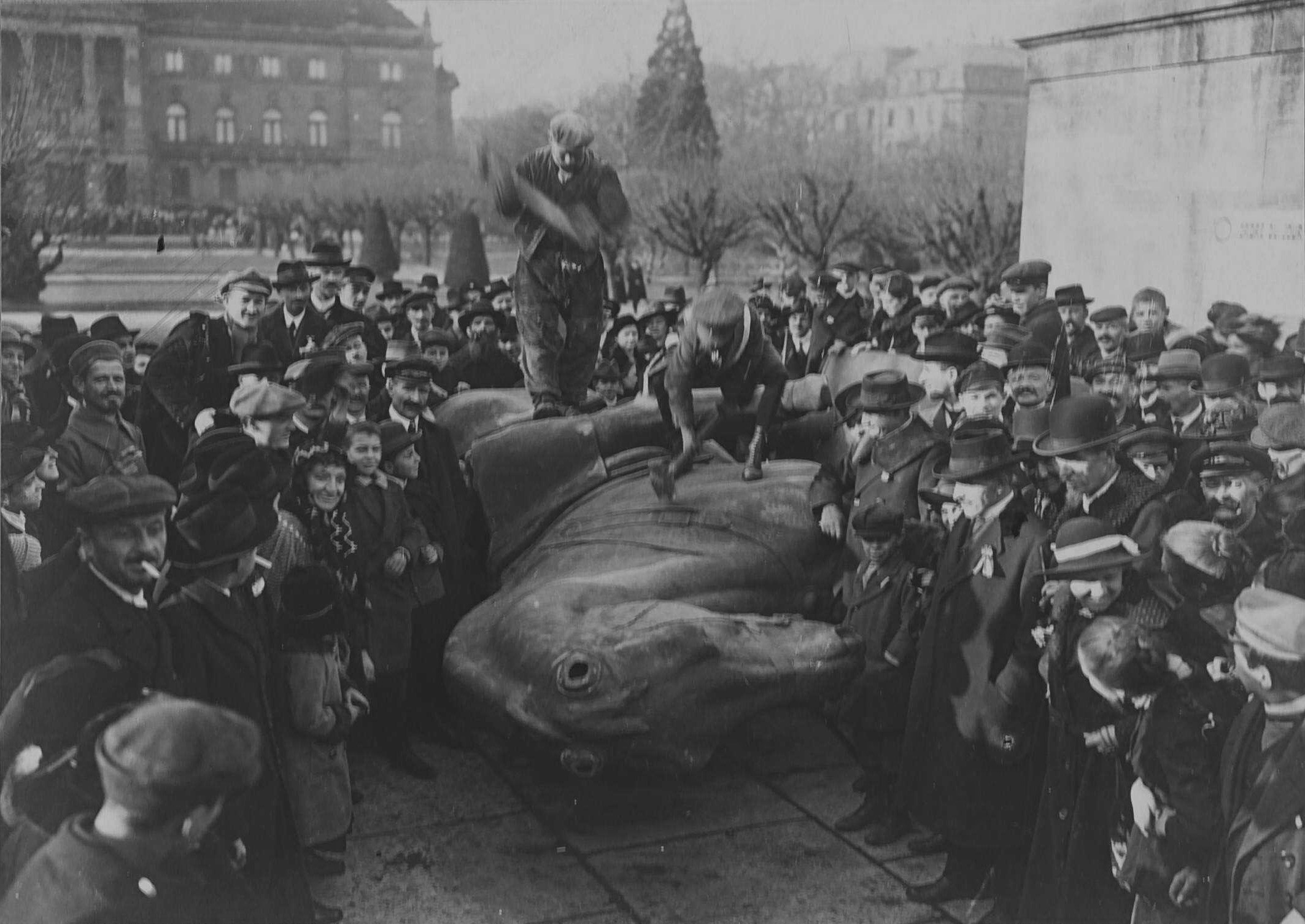
Destruction of the statue of William I in Strasbourg, photograph by Frédéric Gadmer, 21 November 1918

== See also ==
- List of equestrian statues
