= Equestrian statue of Louis XIV (Versailles) =

Equestrian Statue of Louis XIV
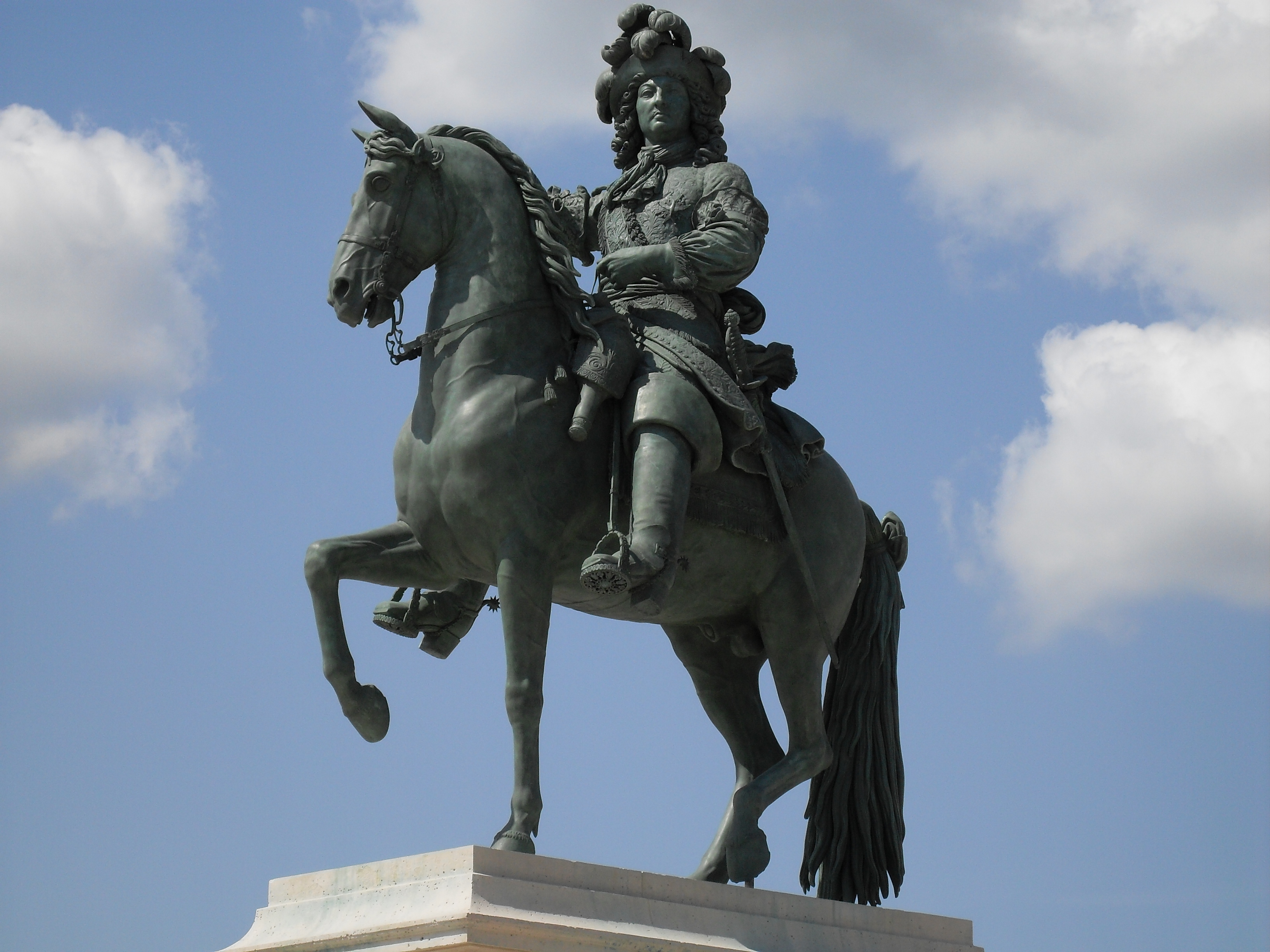
- General view of the statue
- 48°48′12″N 2°07′33″E
- Location: Palace of Versailles, Versailles, Yvelines
- Designer: Cartellier (1757–1831); Petitot (1794–1862); Crozatier (1795–1855)
- Type: Statue
- Material: Bronze

The equestrian statue of Louis XIV is a bronze equestrian statue of the King of France Louis XIV, located on the Place d'Armes in front of the Palace of Versailles. Until 2008–2009, it was located in the cour d'honneur.

== History ==
This statue was designed by Pierre Cartellier. When he died in 1831, only the horse, originally designed for an equestrian statue of Louis XV commissioned in 1816 by Louis XVIII for the Place de la Concorde in Paris and which was ultimately never built, was finished. The rider is the work of Louis Petitot, Cartelier's son-in-law. The whole was cast in bronze by Charles Crozatier in 1838. The proportions of the statues of the horse and the king are slightly different.

First erected in the cour d'honneur of the Palace of Versailles, it was dismantled in February 2006 on the occasion of the reconstruction of the royal gate of this courtyard. The restoration, costing 500,000 euros, was carried out by the Fonderie de Coubertin. It was reassembled on April 21, 2009, on the Place d'Armes of the Château de Versailles. This new location allowed it to be better visible from the Avenue de Paris.

There is also another equestrian statue in Versailles, in marble, commissioned by Louis XIV in 1671 from the sculptor and architect Gian Lorenzo Bernini. The king having lost interest in it, it has since been placed behind the gardens of Versailles.

Elsewhere in France, there are other equestrian statues dedicated to King Louis XIV, such as the equestrian statue in the Place des Victoires in Paris, the equestrian statue in the Place Bellecour in Lyon and the equestrian statue on the Promenade du Peyrou in Montpellier.

== Gallery ==
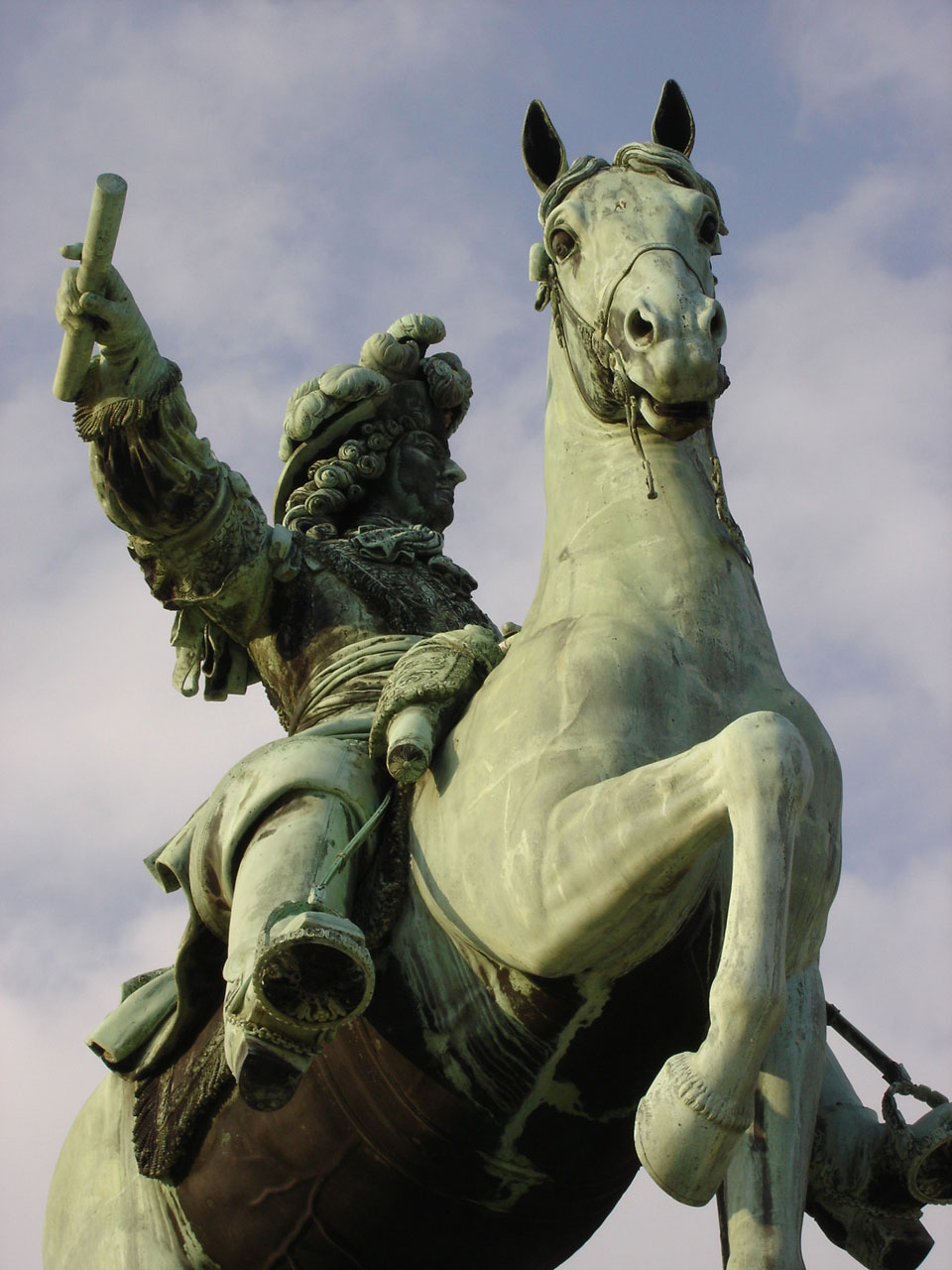
Close-up of the statue

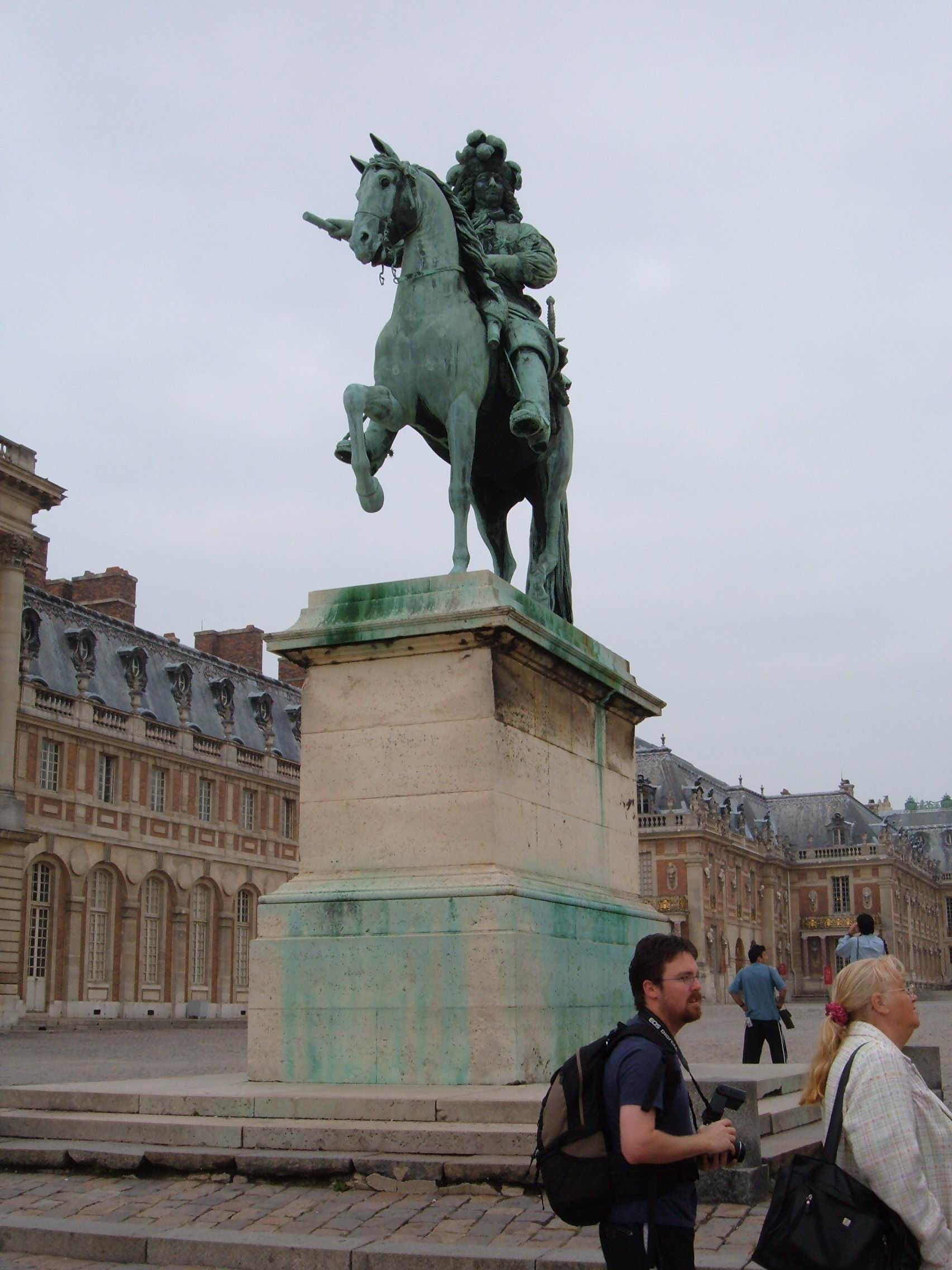
The statue in the cour d'honneur in 2005

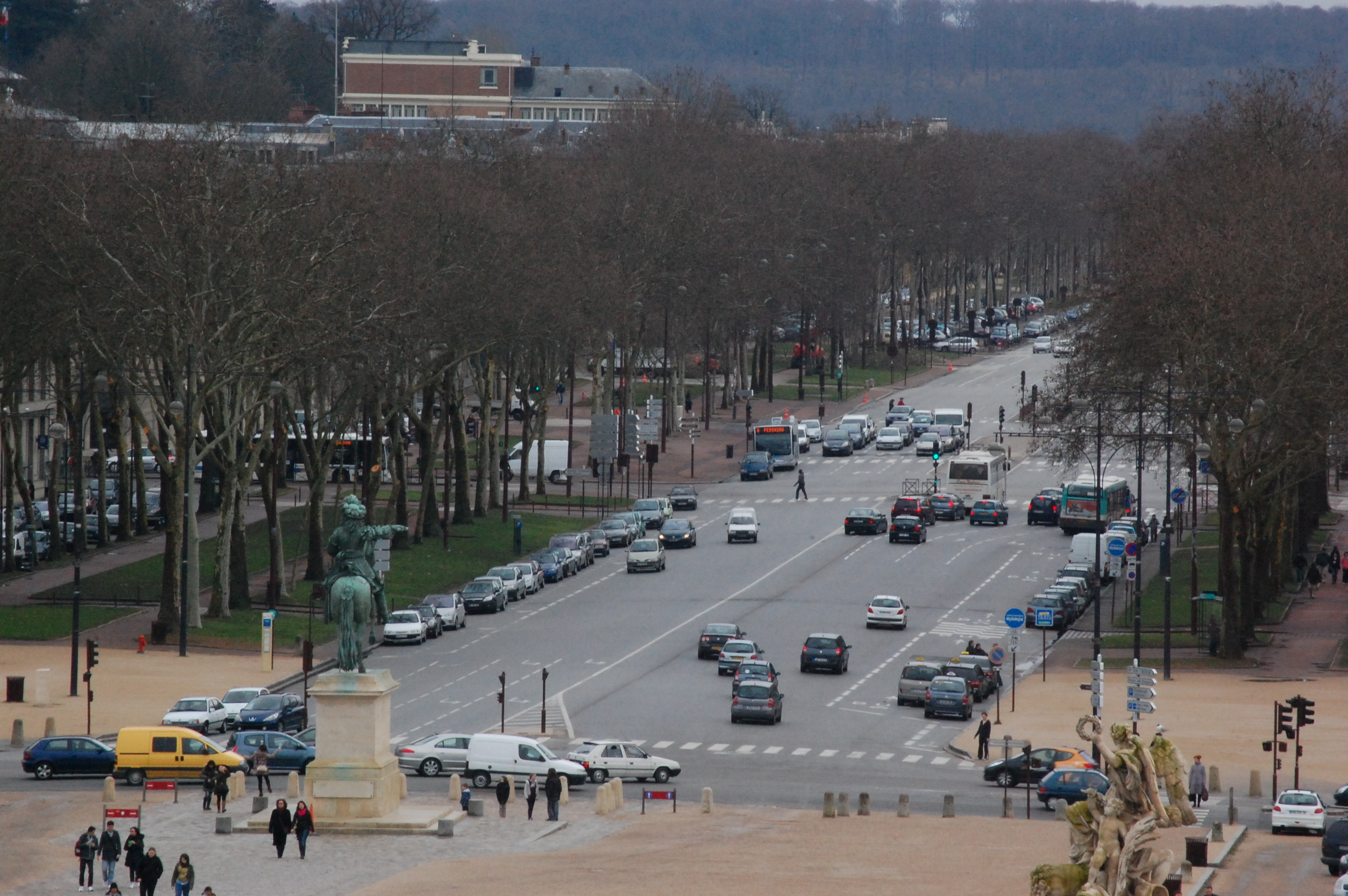
The statue in front of Avenue de Paris.
