= Equestrian statue of Louis XIV (Montpellier) =

Equestrian Statue of Louis XIV
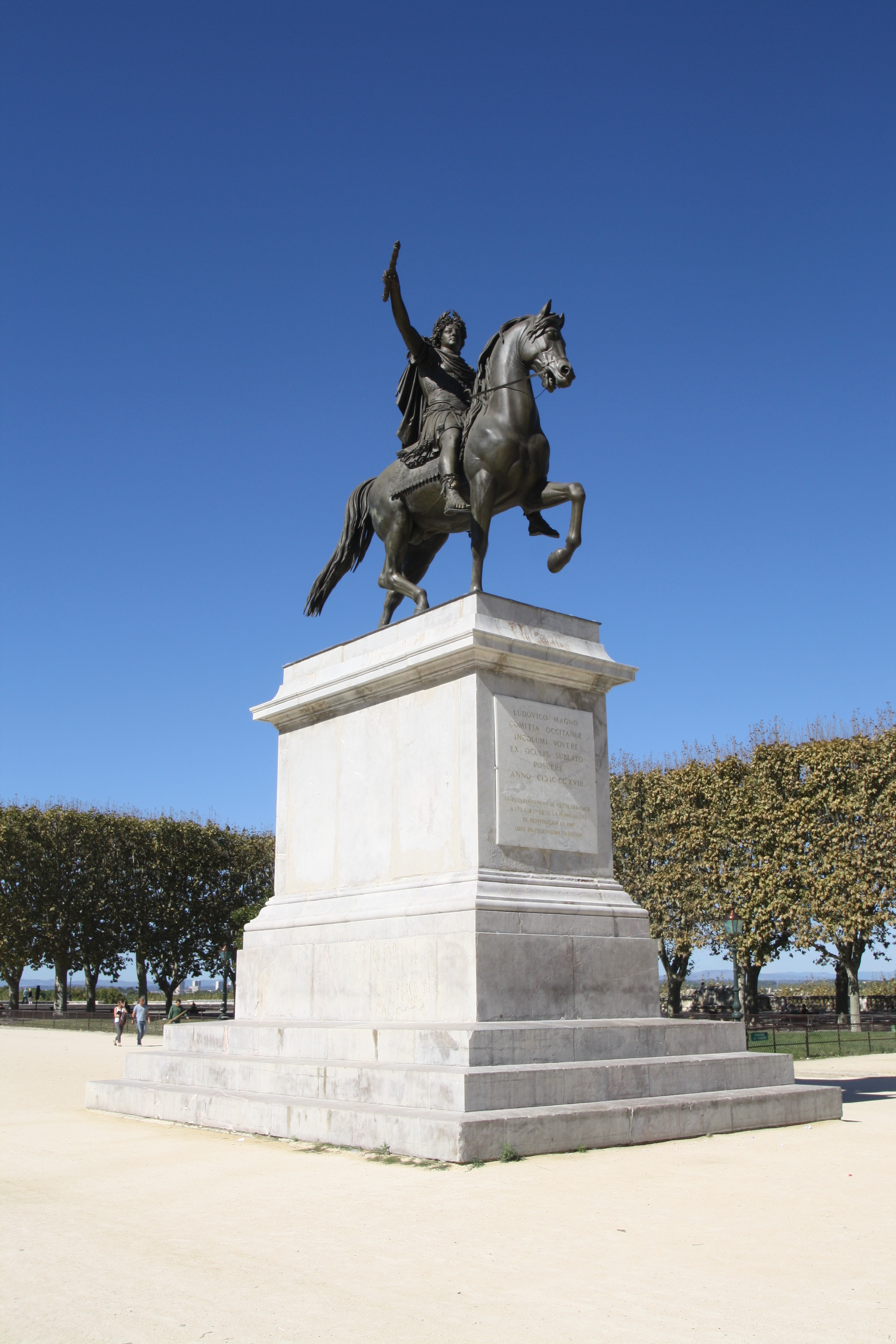
- Interactive map of Equestrian Statue of Louis XIV
- Location: Promenade du Peyrou, Montpellier, France
- Coordinates: 43°36′41″N 3°52′12″E
- Designer: Mansart (1646-1708); Mazeline (1633-1708) (Sculptor); Hurtrelle (1648-1724) (Sculptor); Debay (1779-1863) (Sculptor); Carbonneaux (1769-1843) (Foundry)
- Type: Statue
- Material: Bronze
- Beginning date: 1718
- Completion date: 1828

The equestrian statue of Louis XIV is a monument erected in 1828 in the center of the Promenade du Peyrou in Montpellier, Hérault. Classified as a monument historique in 1954, on a site itself classified in 1943, this bronze statue is the second representation of King Louis XIV in this city, as a previous version was destroyed during the French Revolution. This smaller replica was sculpted by Jean Baptiste Joseph De Bay père and cast by Auguste-Jean-Marie Carbonneaux based on designs by Jules Hardouin-Mansart.

== History ==
Montpellier's equestrian statue of Louis XIV is one of the first representations of the king, following those in Paris (place des Victoires) and Versailles (place d'Armes).

This initiative inspired the construction of similar statues in:

- Rennes, place Louis-le-Grand, now Place du Parlement-de-Bretagne (commissioned in 1686, erected in 1726)
- Dijon, place Royale, now place de la Libération (commissioned in 1686, erected in 1725)
- Lyon, Place Bellecour (commissioned in 1685, erected in 1713)
- Bordeaux, place Royale, now place de la Bourse (inaugurated in 1749)

The history of the equestrian statue is closely linked to that of the Promenade du Peyrou. began on October 31, 1685, with a vote by the Estates of Languedoc to erect an equestrian statue in honor of the king.

The differing political, economic, and philosophical interests of the advisors made decision-making complex, and many years were needed to define a concept for the monument. The spirit of the time required that the monument be erected in a central royal square, symbolizing the king reigning over his subjects. A novel idea presented by the Count of Broglie and the Intendant Lamoignon de Bâville placed the statue in some fields, intending to demonstrate that the king reigned over the region and beyond the cities. The architectural structures of walled cities did not allow for large edifices. Several sites were suggested within the city to host the imposing statue, such as the College of Humanities, which would later become the Musée Fabre, or the Place de la Canourgue.

=== The first statue ===
The commission for the statue was placed in Paris (rue de Bourbon) with sculptors Pierre Mazeline and Simon Hurtrelle on September 23, 1686, based on designs provided by architect Jules Hardouin-Mansart under the supervision of Cardinal de Bonzy. The bronze statue was completed in the Parisian workshop in 1692, standing at 4.5 meters high and 4.8 meters long.

Delays hampered the installation of the work. The naval war between England and France prevented the statue's transport from the capital by sea due to its massive weight (19 tons); the roadways and transportation equipment were not accessible at that time. It wasn't until 1713 that the statue left Paris, traveling via the Seine to Le Havre, then to Bordeaux, up the Garonne River, through the Canal des Deux Mers, to the lagoons of Frontignan and Villeneuve-lès-Maguelone, and finally up the Lez to the Port Juvénal in Montpellier. In Bordeaux, curious onlookers overcrowded the ship, causing it to destabilize and the statue to fall into the water. It ook months to recover and the rescue operation damaged the statue.

The statue arrived in Montpellier in August 1717 and was installed on the Promenade du Peyrou on February 10, 1718. It was inaugurated on February 27 of the same year in the presence of the Intendant de Basville. It bore the following inscription, written by historian de Mandajors:

LUDOVICO MAGNO COMITIA OCCITANIAE INCOLUMI VOVERE EX OCULIS SUBLATO POSUERE. ANNO 1718

translating to "To Louis the Great, the people of Occitania, safe, vowed this statue and erected it after his death." Voltaire approved of it in his work The Age of Louis XIV, interpreting it as "to Louis the Great after his death."

The project took 33 years to complete. It outlived its main instigators, including King Louis XIV himself who died three years earlier.

Enhancements and developments continued on the Promenade du Peyrou, including the construction of the Saint-Clément aqueduct and its reservoir starting in 1753, with the water tower project being approved in 1766.

During the French Revolution, the statue was toppled on October 1, 1792, and sent in pieces to Lyon to be melted down for cannon production. The pedestal was partially used as a base for the Fountain of the Three Graces on the Place de la Comédie. A guillotine soon replaced the statue, resulting in about twenty executions, including ten refractory clergy, nine royalists, two emigrants, a woman who had hidden royalists, and another person.

At the end of the revolutionary decade, Prefect de Nogaret erected a commemorative column in 1800 in honor of soldiers who had died in battle.

=== The current statue ===
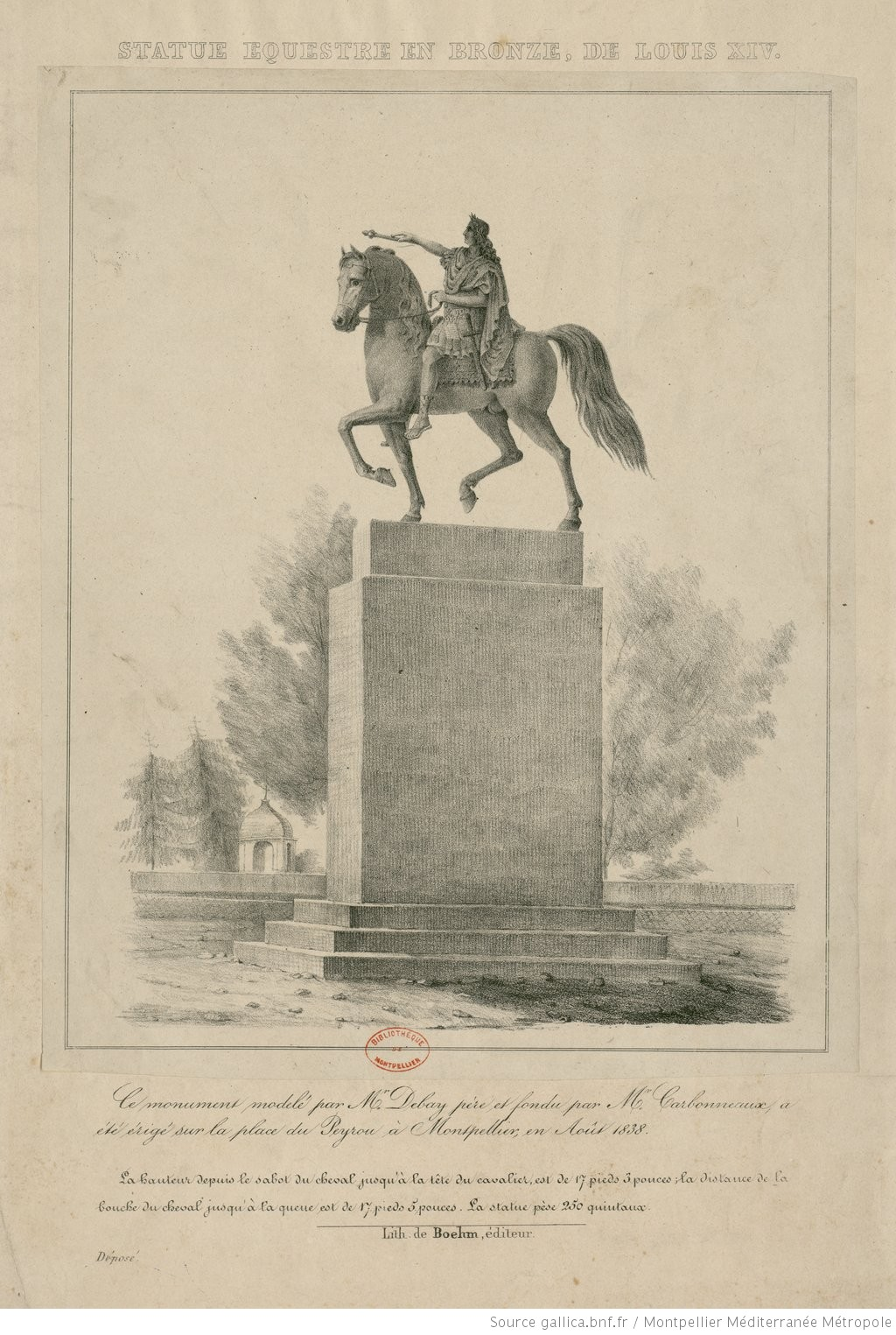
New statue by Beau Père

The Hérault Departmental Council, initially republican and later Bonapartist, transitioned to legitimism. On October 12, 1814, it was unanimously decided to restore the monument with the Latin inscription: "EVERTERAT FUROR, RESTITUIT PIETAS," and the Count of Artois, the future Charles X, symbolically laid the first stone the next day, October 13.

Over several years, correspondence was exchanged between Montpellier and Paris. Prefect Auguste Creuzé de Lesser proposed a replica of the statue from the Place des Victoires in Paris, created by François Joseph Bosio. When the artist refused, the Hérault Departmental Council negotiated with sculptors Jean-Baptiste Debay and Auguste-Jean-Marie Carbonneaux. This was interrupted by the July Revolution of 1830, also known as the "Three Glorious Days."

The revolution brought hostility from part of the population towards the House of Bourbon, which was replaced by the House of Orléans. As a result, the placement of the statue was deliberately delayed. There was even a suggestion to replace the head of the statue with that of Pierre-Paul Riquet. Interim Mayor Dessale-Possel declared on June 26, 1833:

The equestrian statue of Louis XIV should be regarded more as a work of art intended to adorn the Peyrou square rather than as a political monument. Louis XIV is now only a historical figure.

Amid a tumultuous political climate, the statue was reinstalled on August 29, 1838, after a half-century absence. The operation was led discreetly and without ceremony by Mayor Zoé Granier.

== Gallery ==
General views.

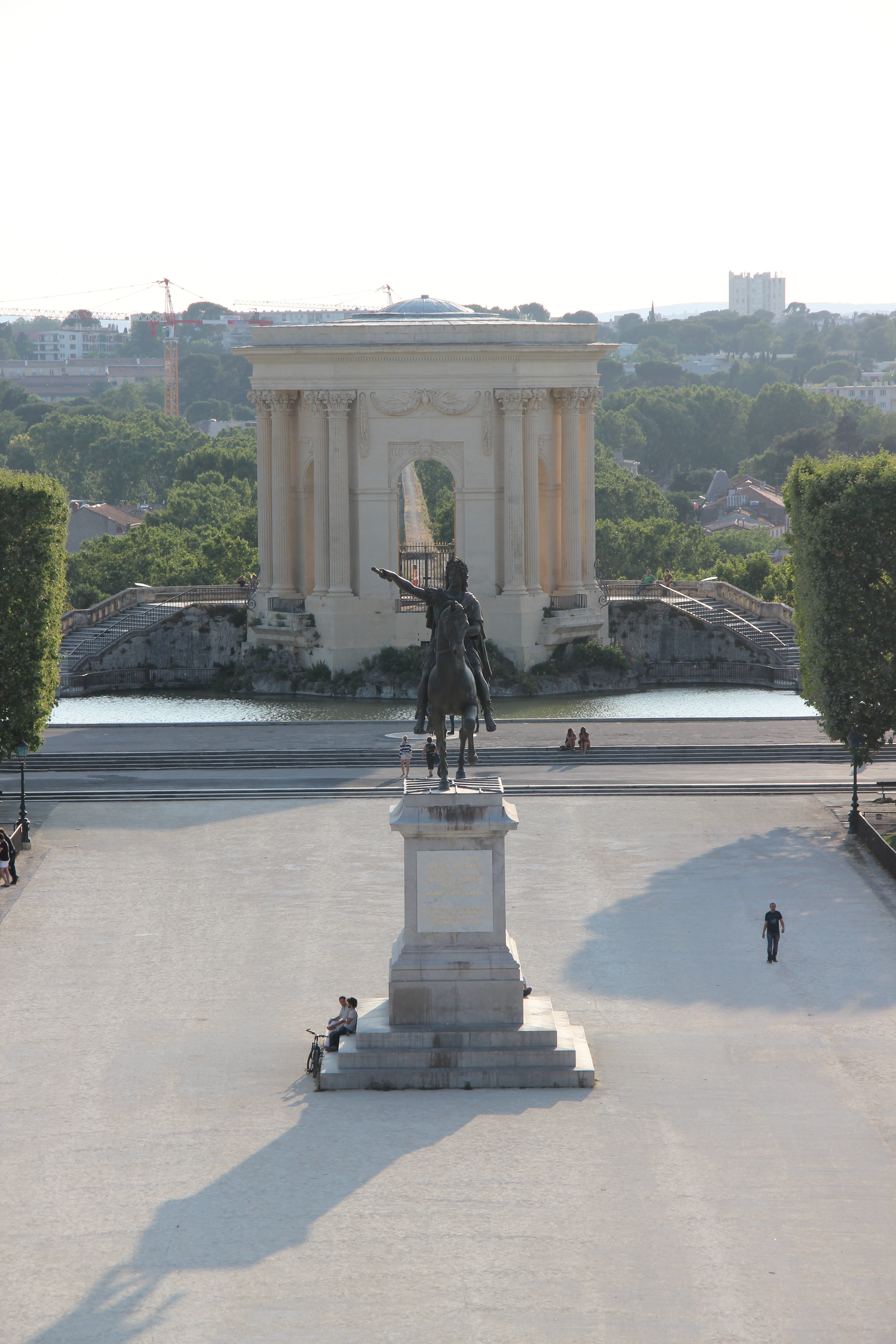
View from the Arc de Triomphe.

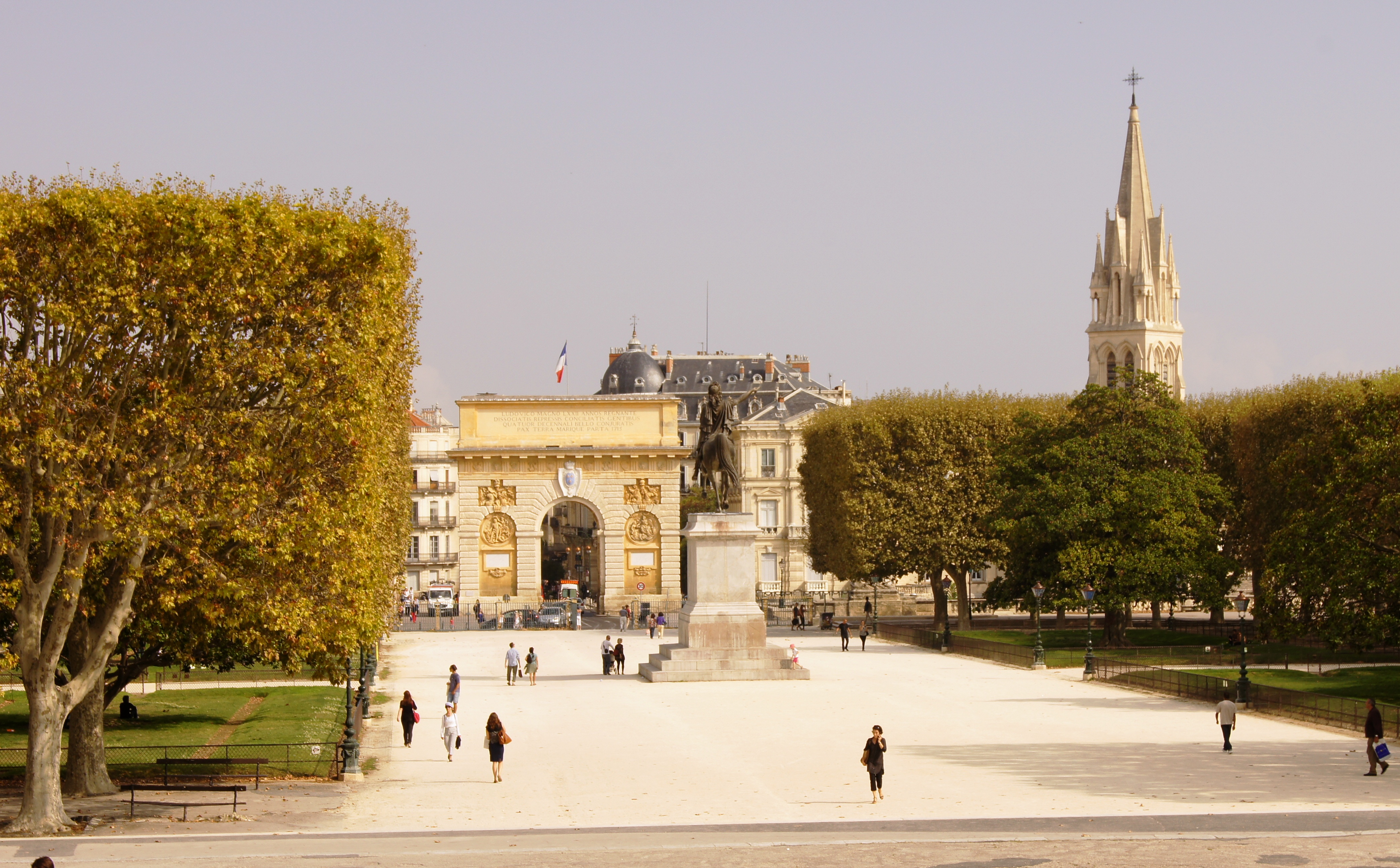
View with the Sainte-Anne Church.

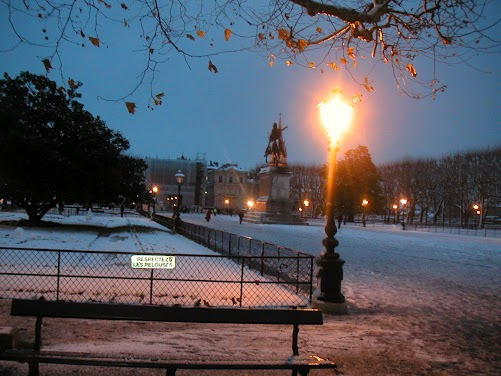
View of the promenade at night.

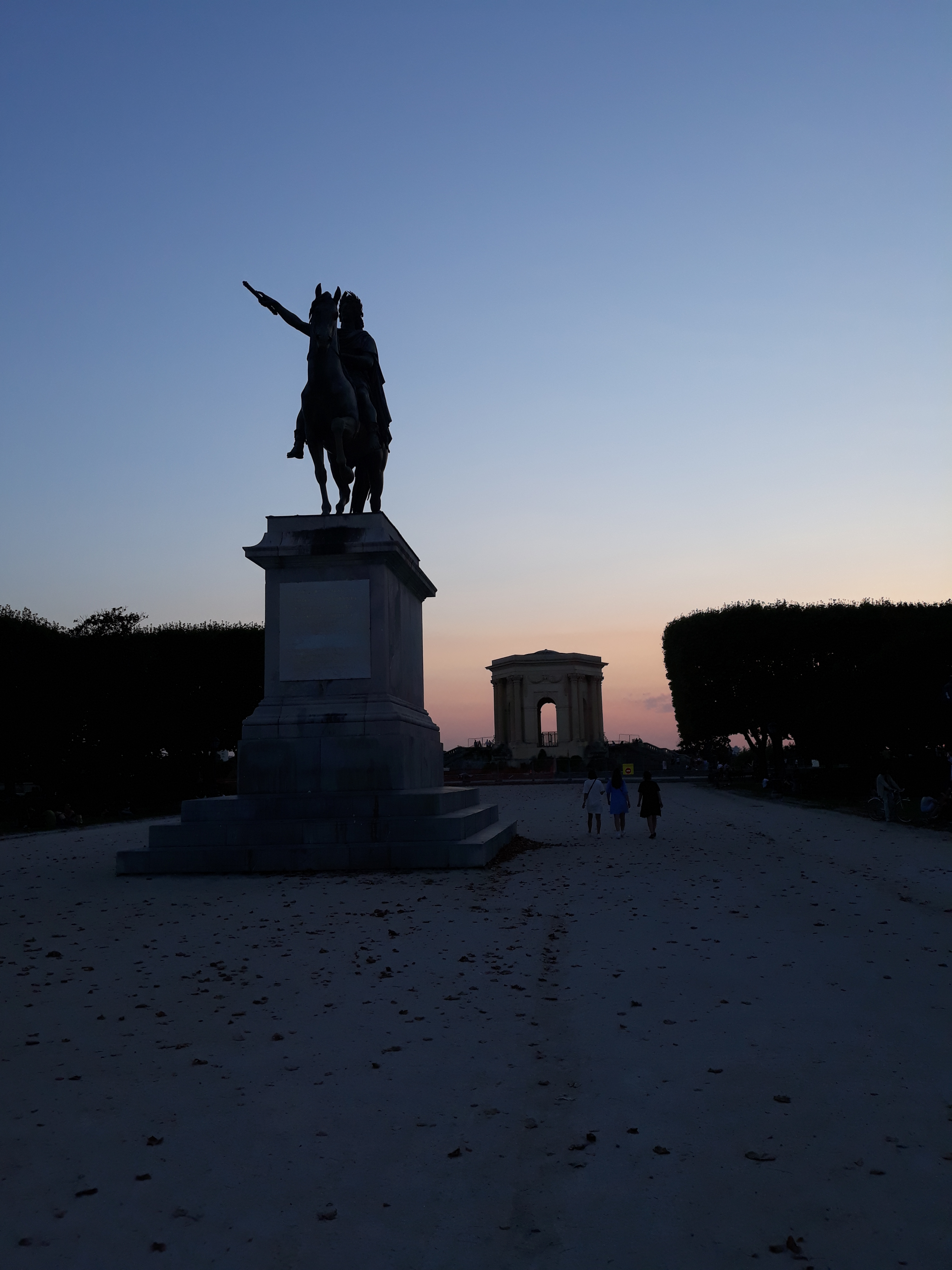
View of the water tower and the statue at sunset.

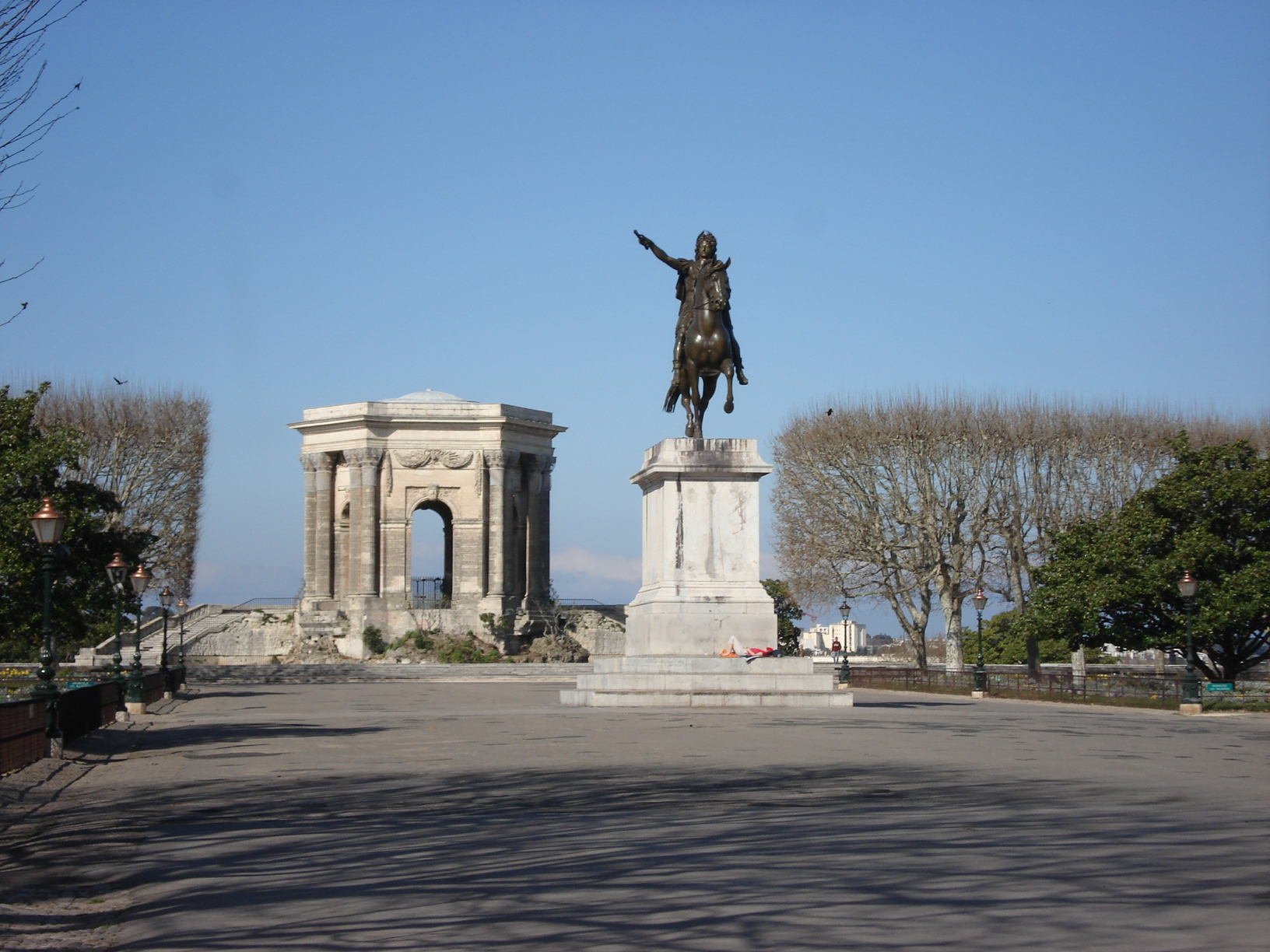
The water tower and the statue of Louis XIV.

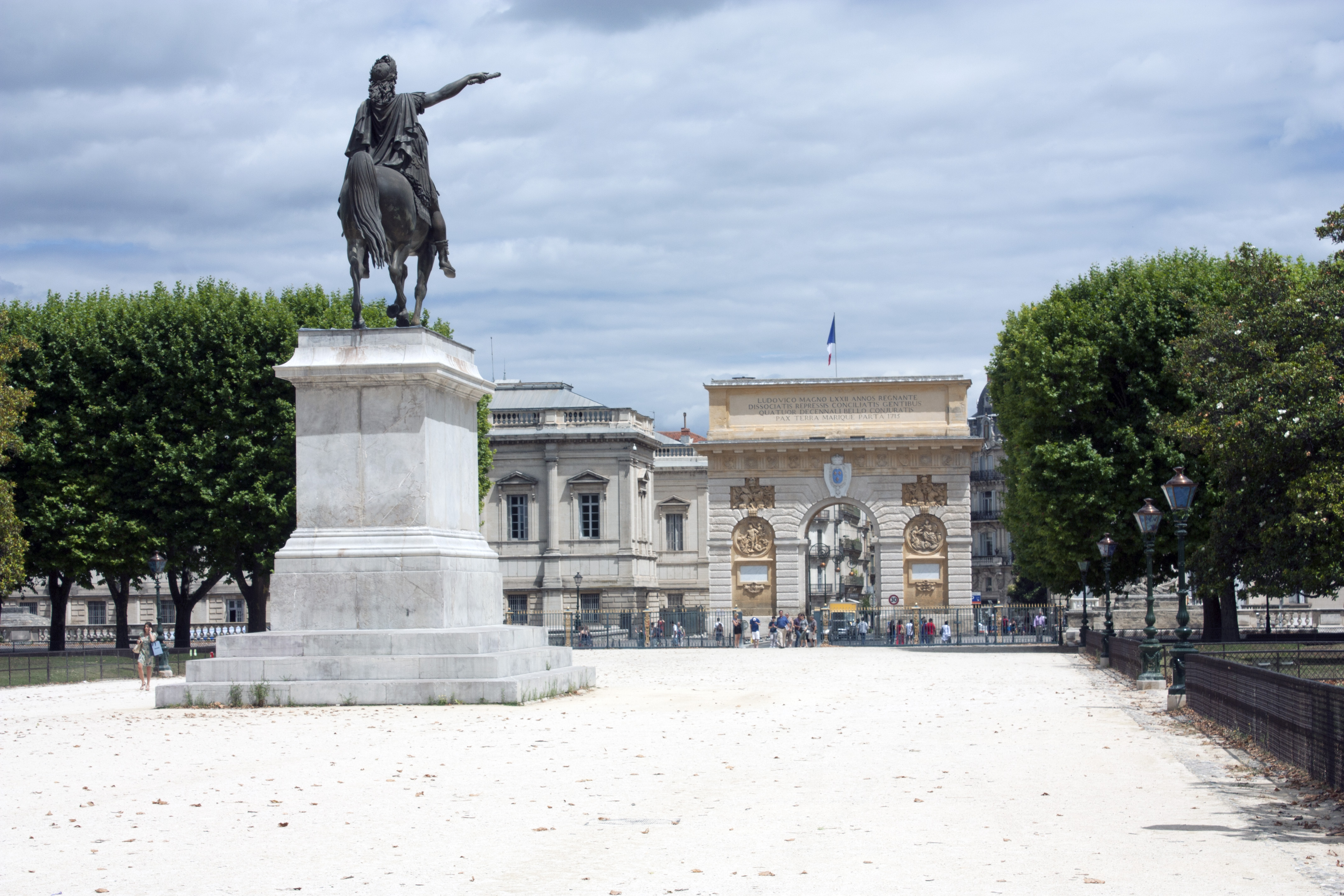
The statue of Louis XIV and the Arc de Triomphe.
Views of the 'Equestrian Statue of Louis XIV'.

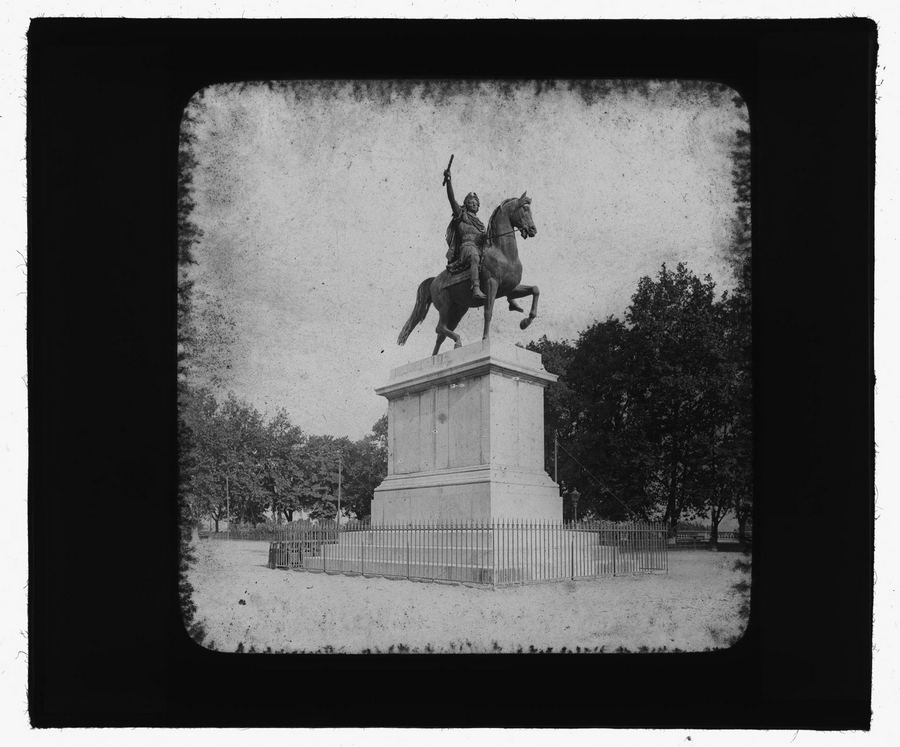

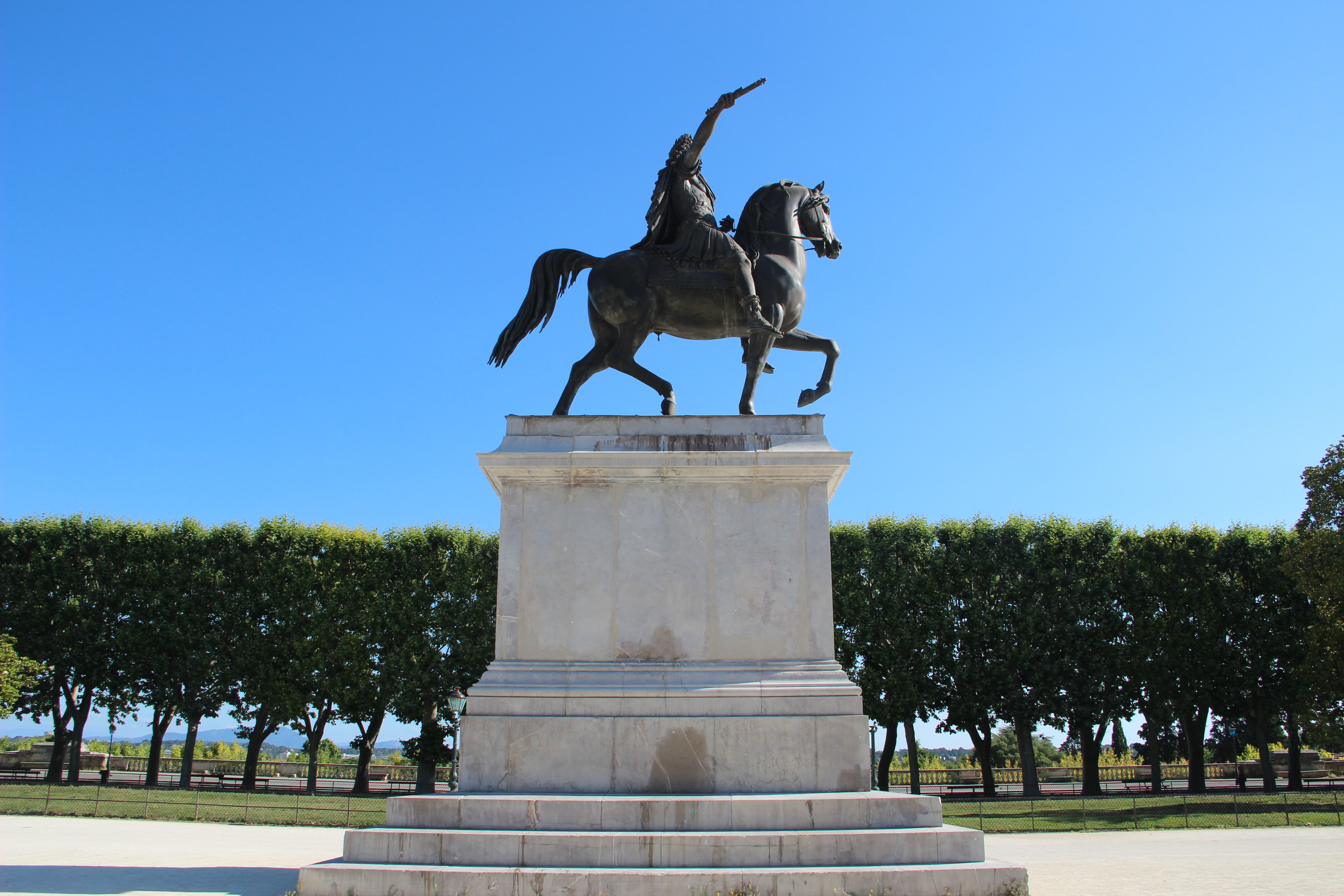

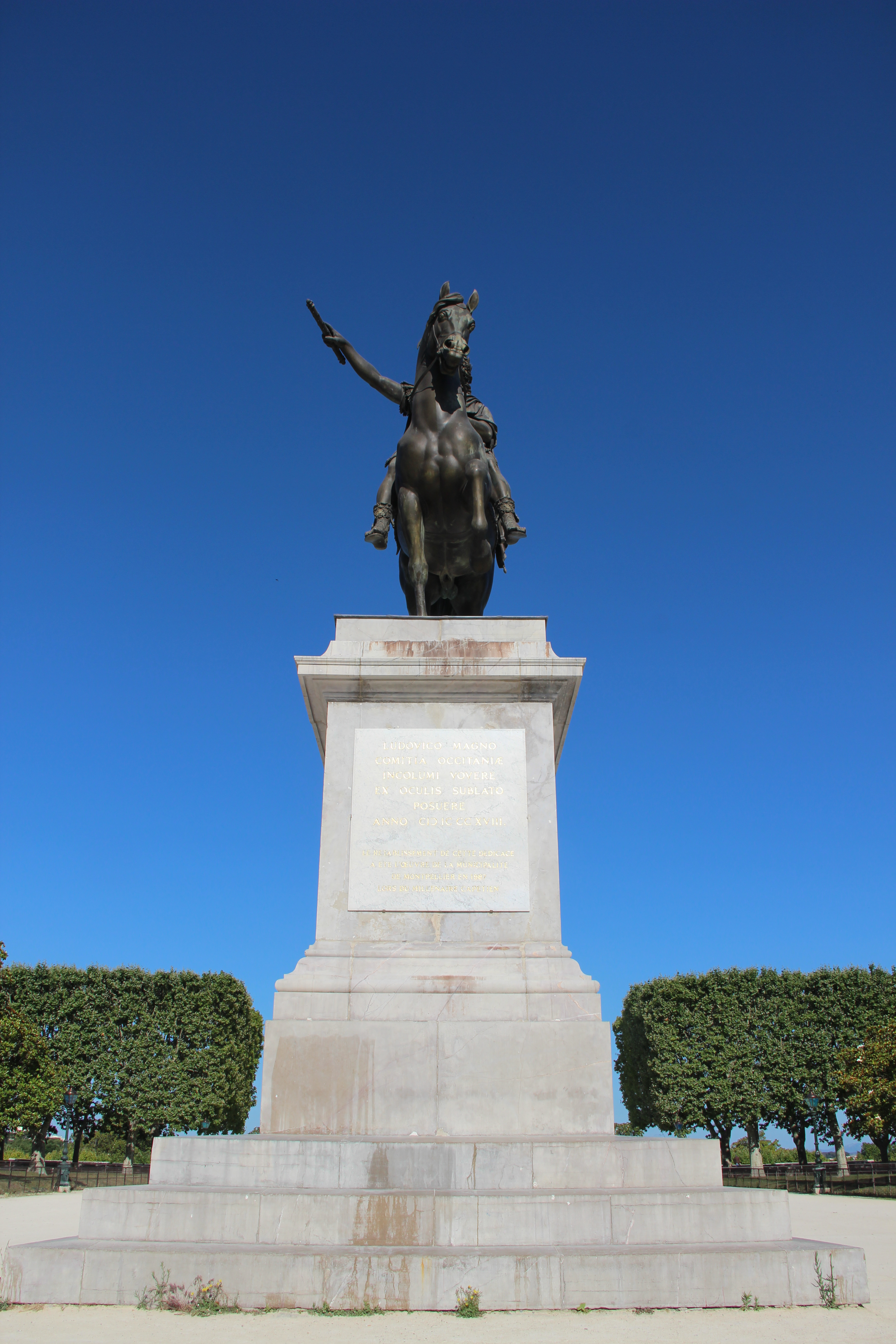

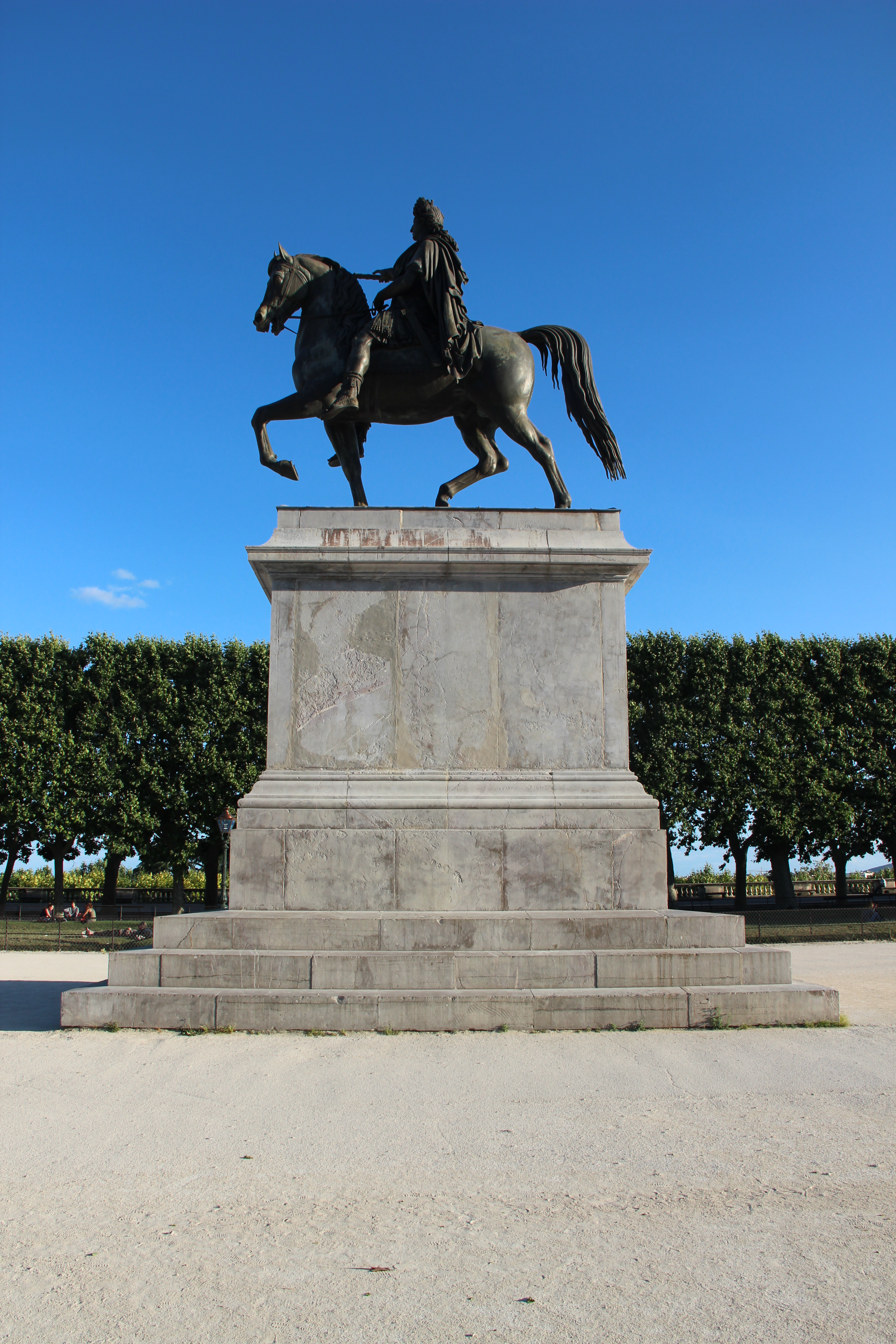

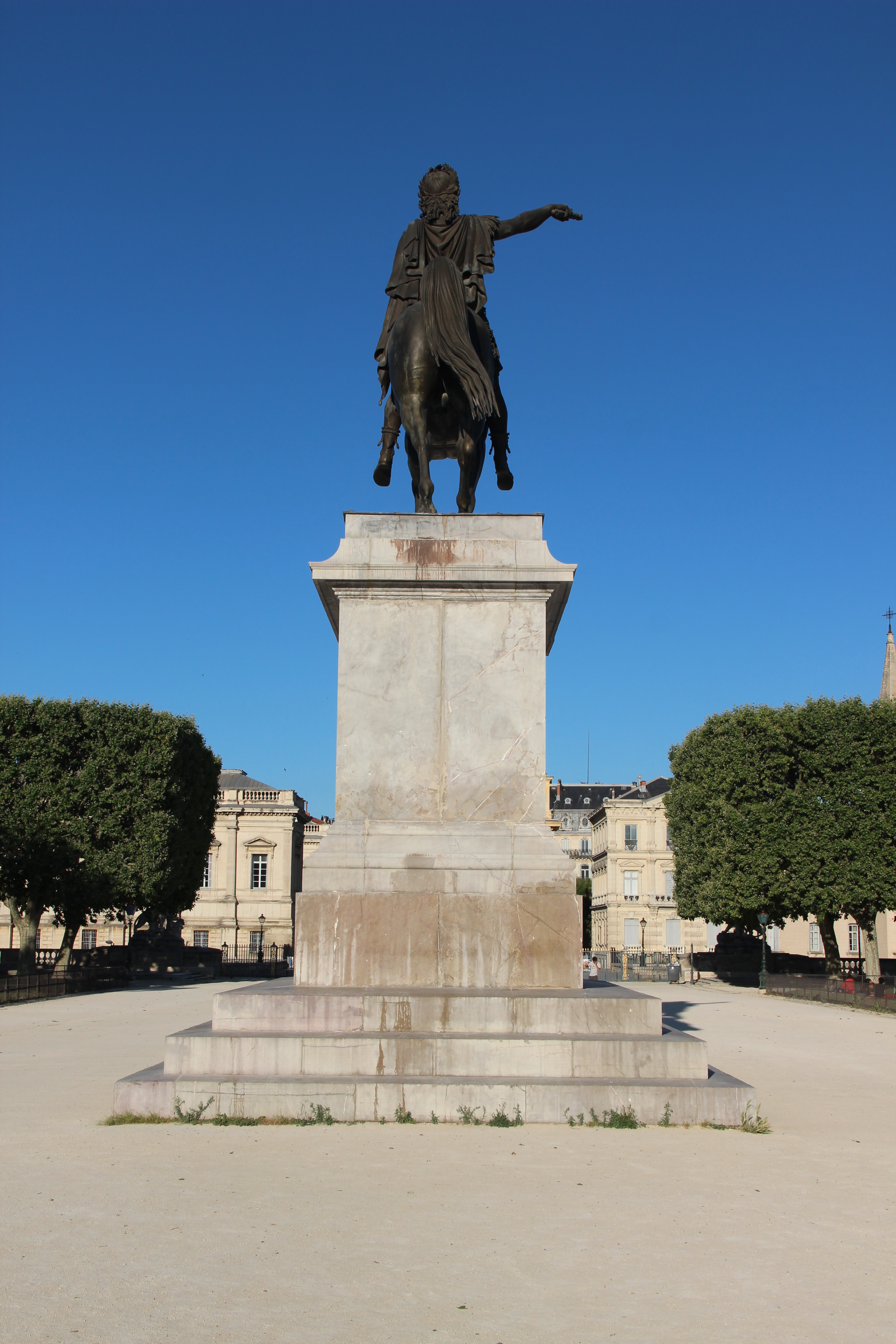

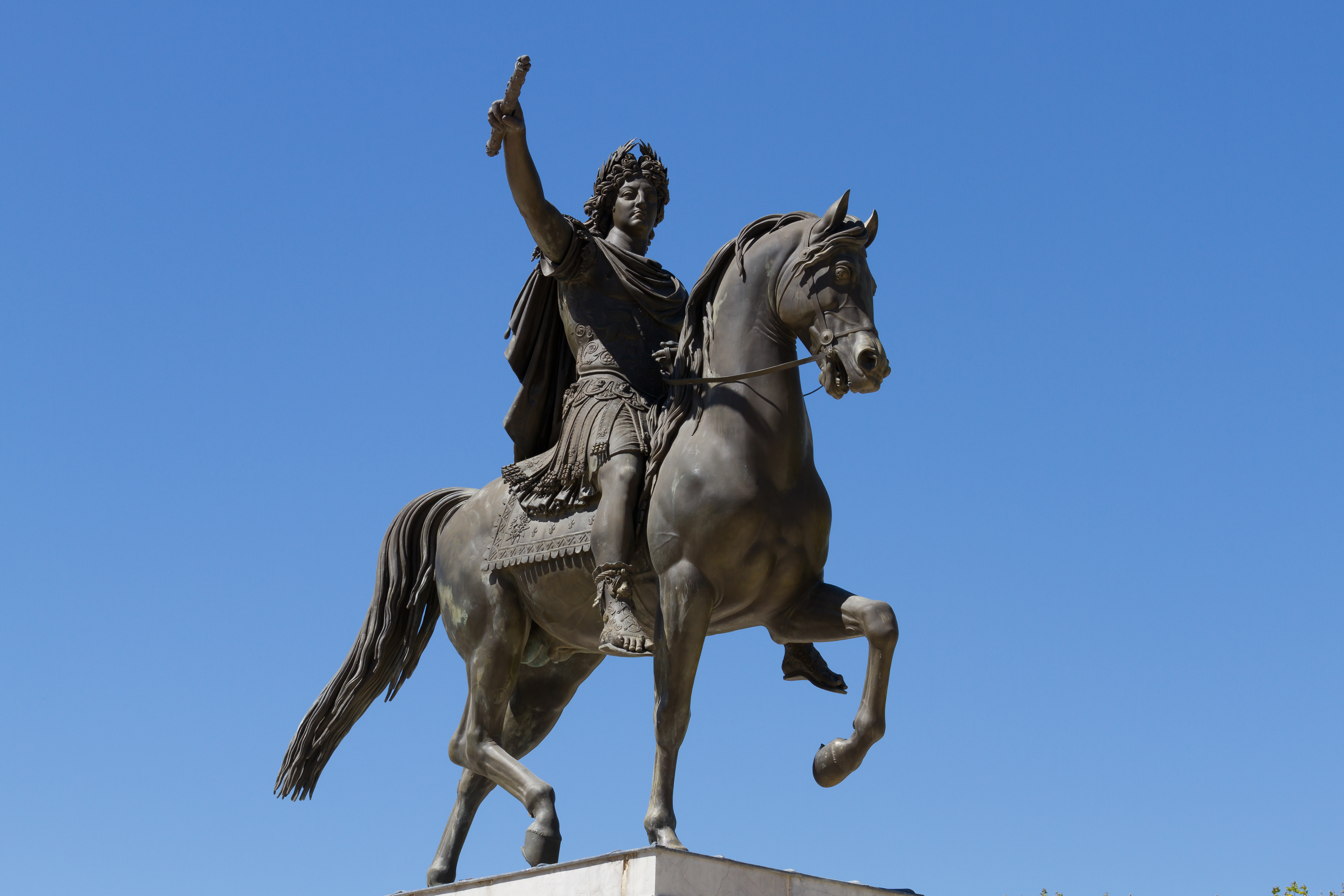

== See also ==
=== Bibliography ===
Non-exhaustive list, sorted by year of publication.

- Charton, Édouard (1846). Montpellier: Le Peyrou et le jardin des plantes [Le Magasin pittoresque] (24 cm) (in French). Vol. 14. Paris: Imp. L. Martinet. p. 299. ISSN 2390-7096. EdouardCharton.
- Thomas, Eugène (1857). Montpellier (in-12) (in French). Montpellier: Félix Seguin. pp. IV-344. EugeneThomas.
- Baumel, Jean (1979). Le Peyrou de Montpellier (24 cm) (in French). Avignon: Presses universelles. p. 110. OCLC 461838764. PeyrouDeMontpellier.
- Thomas, Jean-Pierre; Gaston Vidal (1981). Mémoire sur la place du Peyrou à Montpellier (23 cm) (in French). Montpellier: Ed. de l'Entente bibliophile. p. 163.
- Lochard, Thierry (2006). La Place royale du Peyrou à Montpellier : La statue équestre, le paysage et le territoire (PDF) (in French). Vol. 36. Montpellier: Études Héraultaises. p. 10. Lochard170516.
- Barral, Pierre (2007). Statues royales à Montpellier (PDF) (in French). Montpellier: Montpellier Academy of Sciences and Letters. p. 8. PierreBarral.

== See also ==
- The Porte du Peyrou or the Arc de Triomphe
- The Rue Foch
- List of historic monuments in Montpellier
- List of works of art deliberately destroyed or damaged by revolutionaries during the French Revolution
