= Augustin-Charles d'Aviler =

French architect

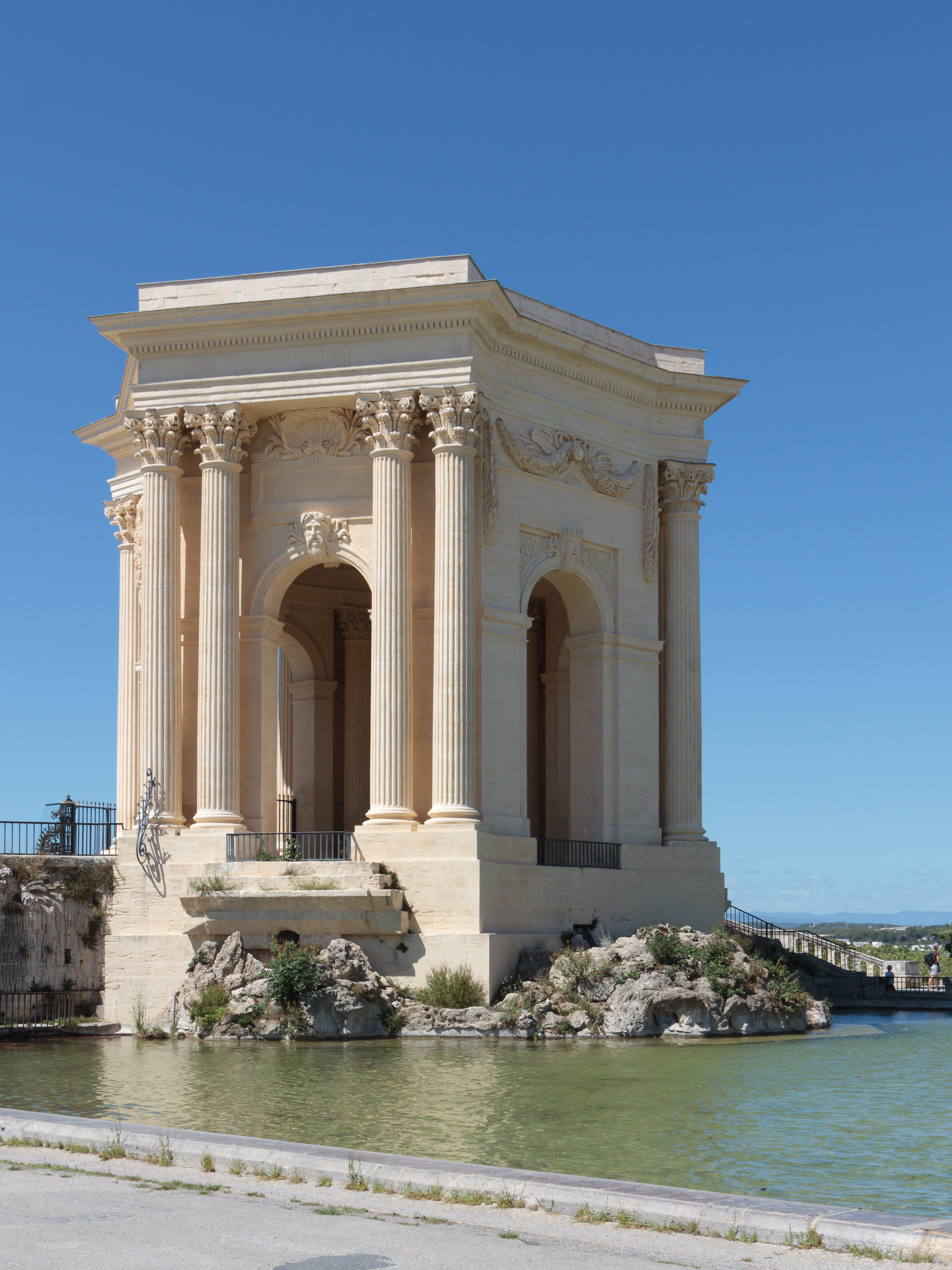

Augustin-Charles d'Aviler (or Daviler) (1653 – 23 June 1701) was a 17th-century French architect. He was one of the main promoters of the vignolesc canon, but far from simply publishing it, he developed it by proposing variations of motifs to give more flexibility and expressiveness to the rigid system of the five orders.

== Biography ==
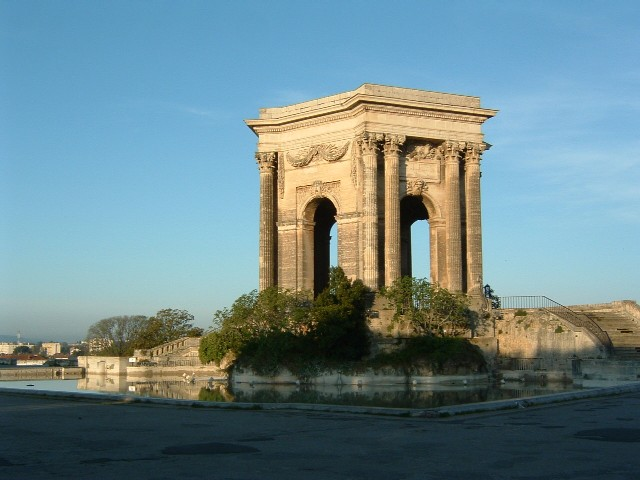
The water tower of the Promenade du Peyrou by Henri Pitot in Montpellier

Born in Paris, from the nobles of the Robe, d'Aviler was first a pupil of Jean-François Blondel (1683–1756), a French architect and author of the Palais des Consuls at Rouen at the Académie royale de peinture et de sculpture.

His qualities as an architect earned him a scholarship to the Académie de France à Rome. He left in 1674 with Antoine Desgodetz, but the ship that was taking him to Italy was stormed by the Moors, and he was held in slavery for 18 months in Algiers and then in Tunis. He finally reached Rome, and studied there from 1676 to 1679 under the direction of Charles Errard.

As soon as he returned, he undertook a commentary on the theory of the "5 orders" by Giacomo Barozzi da Vignola.

In order to acquire a real practice, he was an apprentice architect from 1684 to 1689 under the direction of Jules Hardouin-Mansart. Upon Colbert's death, he obtained the protection of Louvois, which allowed him to publish a complete Cours d'architecture (1691).

He then settled in Montpellier where the orders which were addressed to him multiplied, including the Porte du Peyrou and the beginnings of the development of this vast esplanade similar to a royal square (the equestrian statue of Louis XIV thrones in its middle). He will also provide the drawing of the panelling for the chapell of the Pénitents blancs of this town.

He also built the barracks of Nîmes, Lunel, Montpellier (disappeared in the 1980s), Mèze and Béziers, the Saint-Denis de Montpellier and Saint-Pierre of Vigan churches and also the hôtel de ville de Nîmes among numerous other realisations.

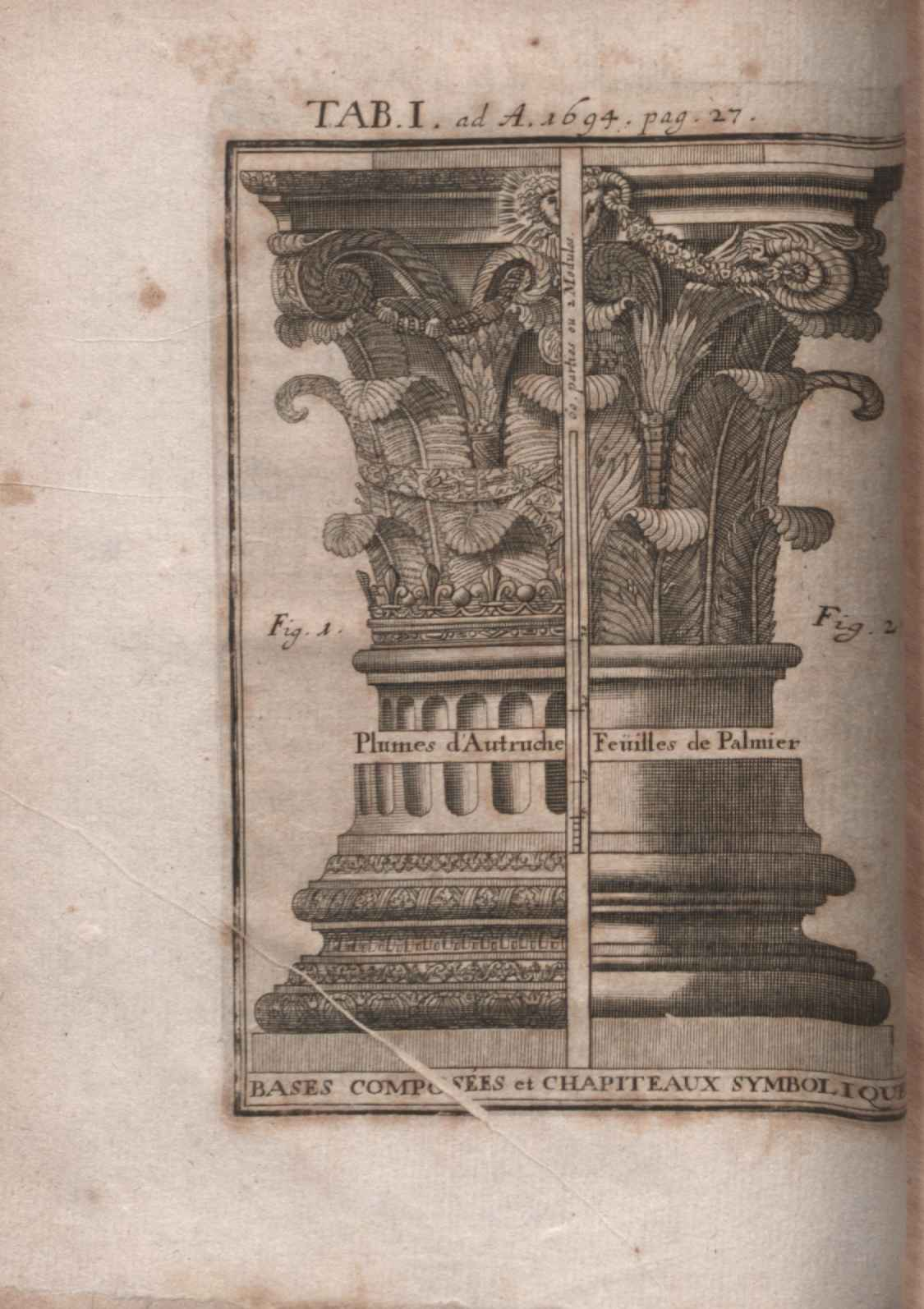
Illustration of the critic in the Cours d'architecture published in the Acta Eruditorum (1694)

Overwhelmed by work, Aviler lost his health there and died prematurely in Montpellier.

== Works ==
- Bibliography online on "Architectura"
- Scamozzi, Vincent (1685). Les cinq ordres d'architecture de Vincent Scamozzi tirez du 6me livre de son Idée générale d'architecture (in French). Paris: Jean-Baptiste Coignard.
- Augustin-Charles d'Aviler, Cours d'architecture..., Paris, Nicolas Langlois, 1691, http://architectura.cesr.univ-tours.fr/Traite/Notice/ENSBA_LES223.asp?param=
- d'Aviler, Augustin-Charles (1710). Cours d'architecture qui comprend les ordres de Vignole: Tome 1 (in French). Paris: Jean Mariette. Digital
- d'Aviler, Augustin-Charles (1710). Cours d'architecture qui comprend les ordres de Vignole: Tome 2 (in French). Paris: Jean Mariette.
- d'Aviler, Augustin-Charles; Mariette, Pierre-Jean (1750). Cours d'architecture. Paris: Pierre-Jean Mariette. p. 408.
- d'Aviler, Augustin-Charles (1755). Dictionnaire d'architecture civile et hydraulique et des arts qui en dépendent. Paris: Charles-Antoine Jombert.
- Augustin-Charles d'Aviler - Cours d'architecture (1691), rééd. éditions de l'Espérou, series Publications de l'université de Montpellier 3. ISBN 2-84269-479-1

== Bibliography ==
- Thierry Verdier - Augustin-Charles d'Aviler, architecte du roi en Languedoc 1653-1701 - Les presses du Languedoc - ISBN 2-85998-267-1, 588 pages.
