= Louis Petitot =

French sculptor (1794–1862)

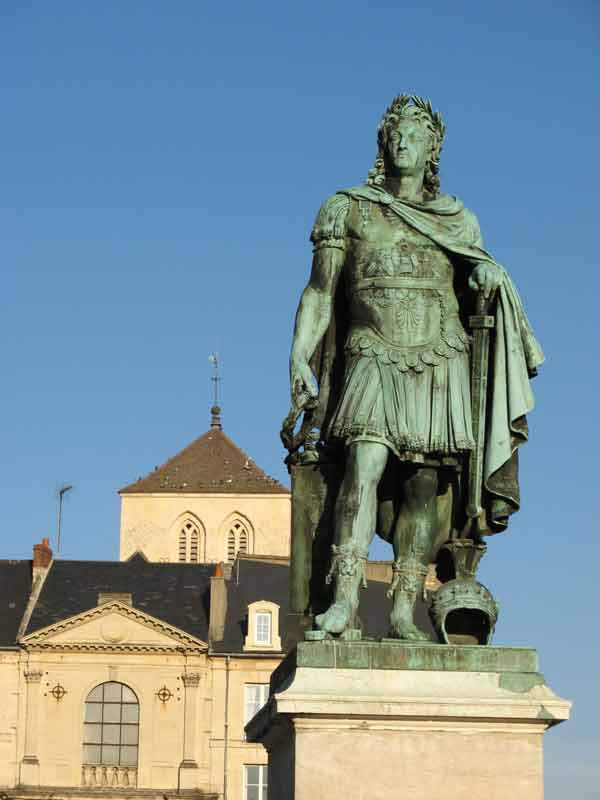
Louis XIV, bronze, place Royale, Caen, 1828

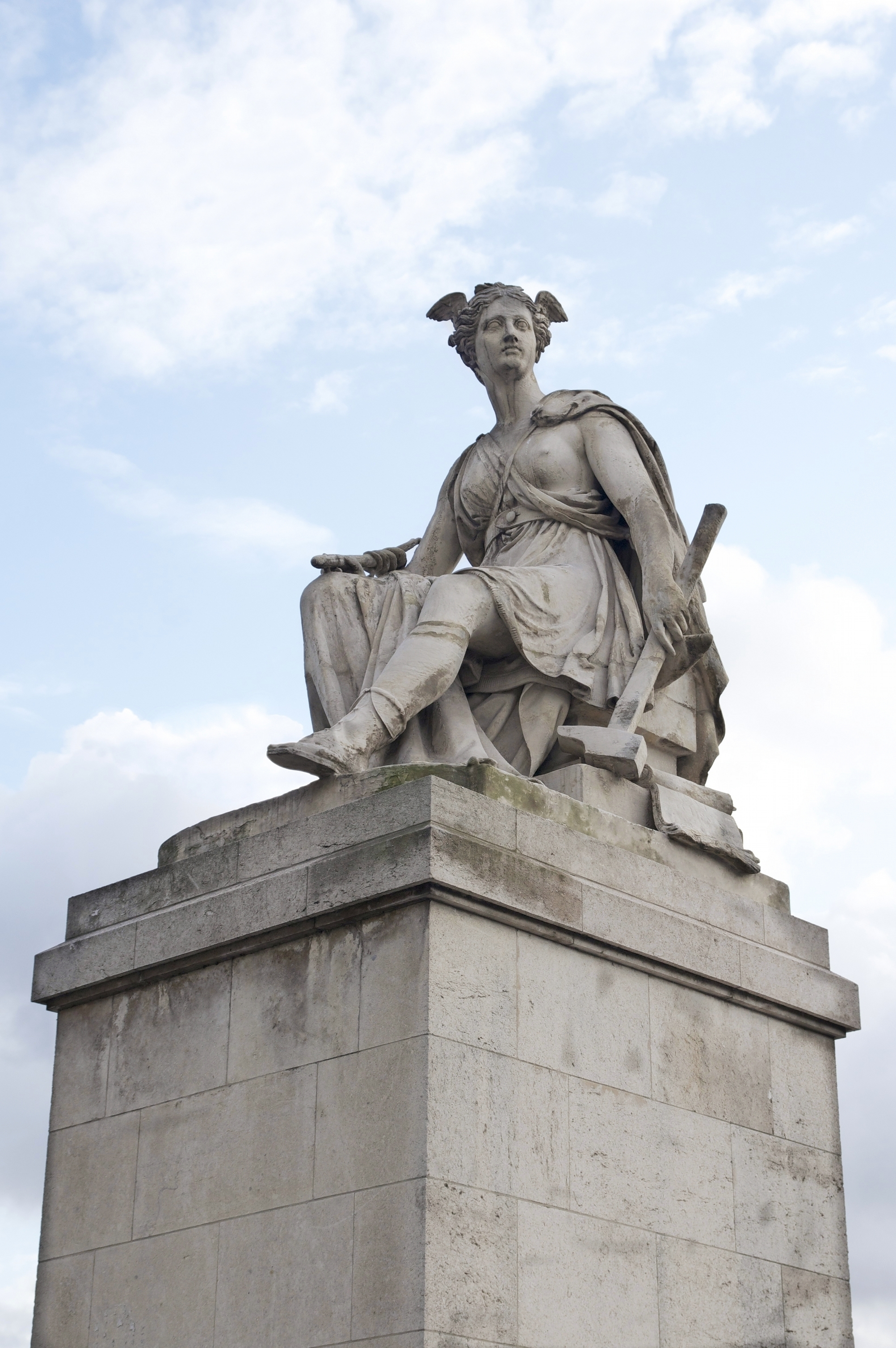
Industry, 1846, Pont du Carrousel, Paris.

Louis-Messidor-Lebon Petitot (23 June 1794 – 1 June 1862) was a French sculptor, who was born and died in Paris. He was the pupil and son-in-law of the sculptor Pierre Cartellier.

== Life and career ==
Petitot won the Prix de Rome for sculpture and spent his time, 1815–19, at the French Academy in Rome as a pensioner of King Louis XVIII. On his return to Paris he worked again with Pierre Cartellier, who was engaged in an equestrian statue of Louis XIV, to be erected in the cour d'honneur of Versailles, as part of the celebration of the Bourbon Restoration; at Cartellier's death, only the horse had been cast in bronze. Petitot successfully completed the commission, which was erected in 1817.

In 1822 he completed a commemorative marble bust of Claude de Forbin (1656–1733), which was exhibited in the Paris Salon of 1822 and was purchased for Versailles.

He exhibited a Young Hunter Wounded by a Snake (illustration) at the Paris Salon of 1827, which was purchased for the Musée du Louvre, and partly on the strength of it, was invited to produce a standing sculpture of Louis XIV, to be cast in bronze and set up in the place Saint-Sauveur, Caen. It was formally inaugurated 24 May 1828, with such success that Petitot and the bronze-founder, Crosatier of Paris, were each named Chevalier de la Légion d'honneur. The monument was intended to replace the stone sculpture of Louis XIV, by Jean Postel, sculptor of Lyon, which was commissioned in 1684 and erected the following year, but which had been taken down and demolished during the Revolution.

Petitot was the sculptor of the marble bust of Pierre Cartellier on his tomb in the Cemetery of Père-Lachaise, Paris, and a statue representing Friendship; the tomb was added to the lists of monuments historiques, 25 January 1990. For the tomb in the same plot of Cartellier's daughter, Petitot's sister-in-law, Charlotte Cartellier-Heim, he produced a bas-relief of a young couple watering a rosebush.

He was elected a member of the Académie des Beaux-Arts.

== Other works ==
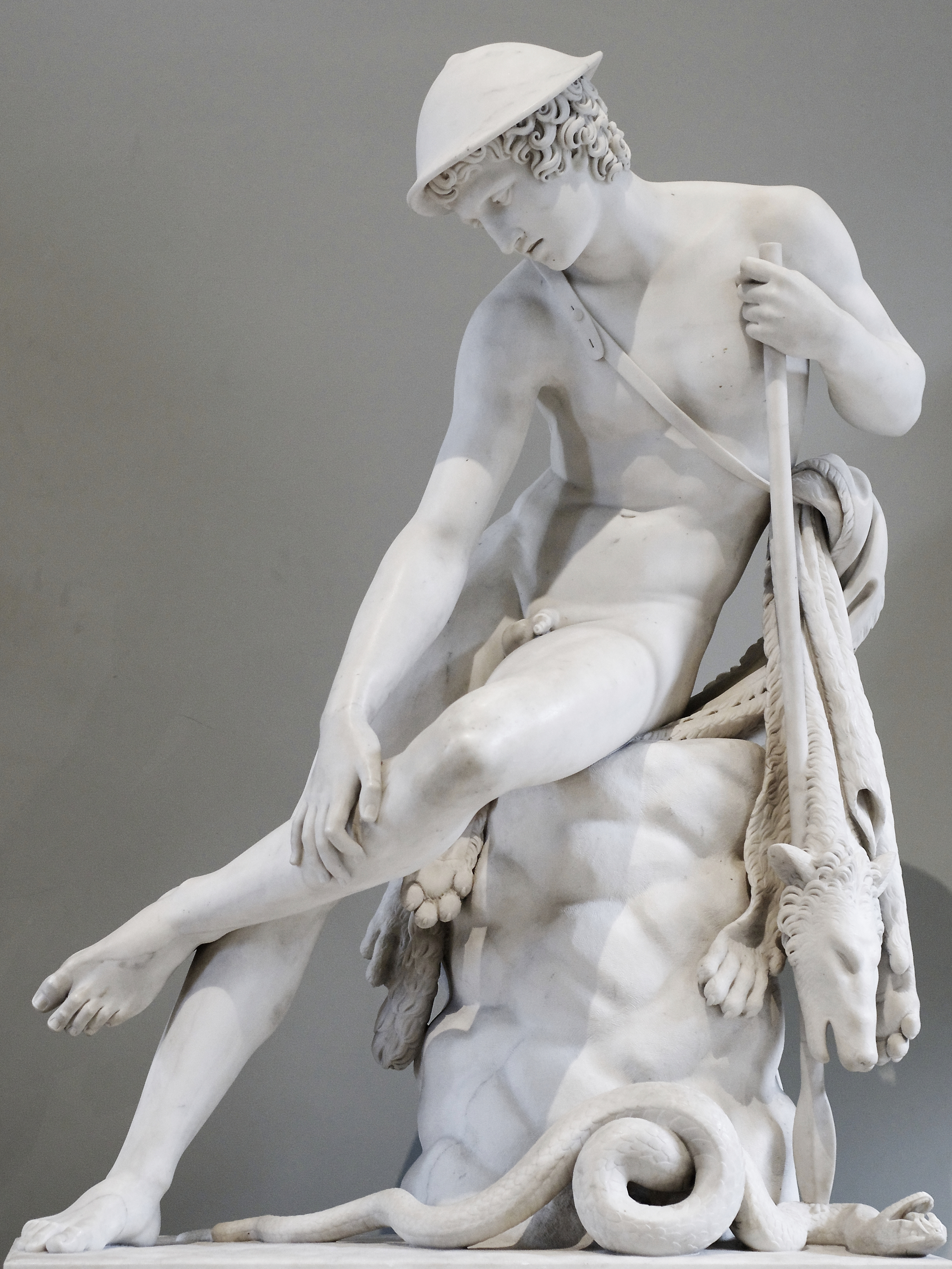
Young Hunter Wounded by a Snake, Louvre Museum

- The Capitulation of General Francisco Ballesteros at Campillo, a marble bas-relief commemorating the event in the French intervention in Spain of 4 August 1823, completed in 1831 (Louvre Museum).
- The City of Lyon and The City of Marseille, stone sculptures for the south-east corner of Place de la Concorde, next to the Quai des Tuileries, 1836.
- Portrait bust of Henri, duc de Rohan, colonel general of the Swiss Guard, completed in 1838 (Versailles).
- Portrait bust of Bon-Adrien Jeannot de Moncey, duke of Conegliano, marshal of France, (1843–45) (Versailles).
- Two marble bas-reliefs, Louis XIV Crowned by Victory, Protecting the Arts and Sciences and Helios of Rhodes, for the redecoration of the Escalier de la Reine, Versailles, completed in 1844.
- Four stone allegorical groups (Industry, Abundance, The City of Paris The Seine) for the pont du Carrousel, 1846.
- Funeral monument of Louis Bonaparte, former king of Holland, comte de Saint-Leu, Church of Saint-Leu et Saint Gilles, Saint-Leu-la-Forêt (val d'Oise).
