= Pierre Cartellier =

French sculptor (1757–1831)

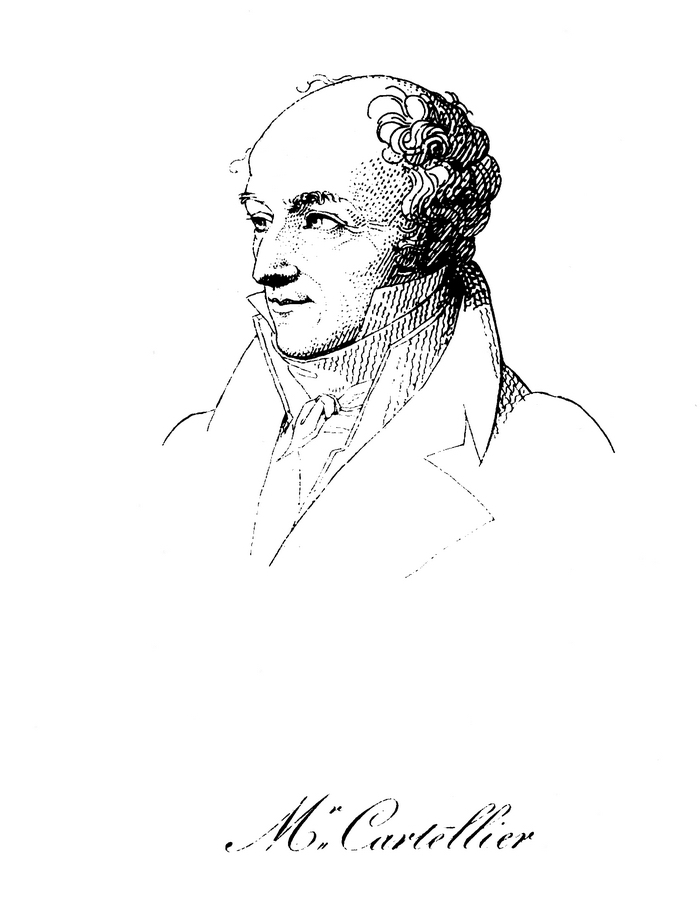
Pierre Cartellier by Jacques Marie Noël Frémy (1782-1867)

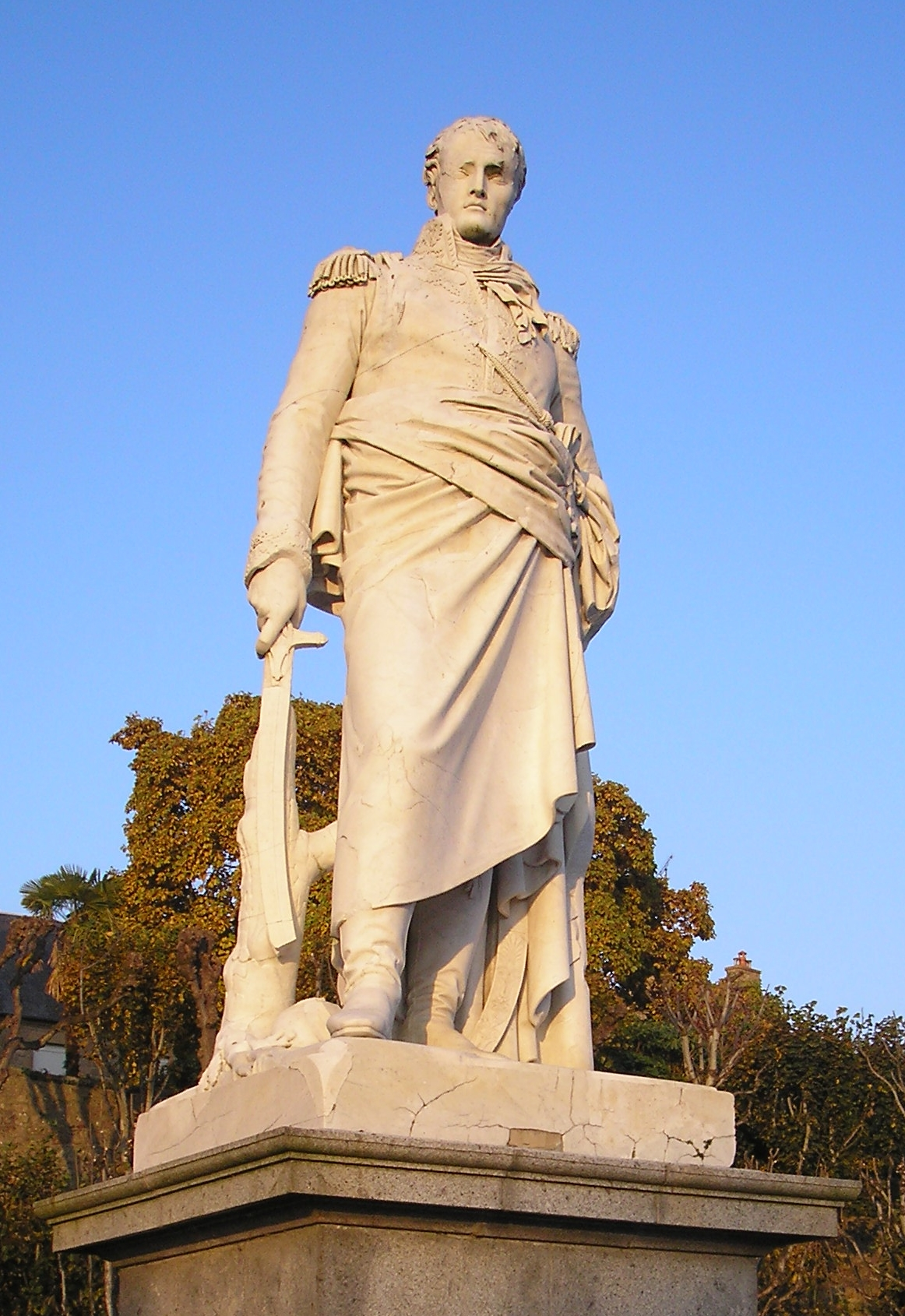
Sculpture of General Valhubert, twice life-size, for the Pont de la Concorde, Paris, 1815 (currently located in the Jardin de l'Eveché, Avranches, Normandy)

Pierre Cartellier (2 December 1757 – 12 June 1831) was a French sculptor.

== Biography ==
Pierre Cartellier was born in Paris. He studied at the École Gratuite de Dessin in Paris and then in the studio of Charles-Antoine Bridan, before attending the Académie Royale. During the French Revolution, Cartellier was part of a team of sculptors who worked on the church of Saint Geneviève in Paris to convert it to the Panthéon.

At a time in European history when ancient works were the measure by which all statuary was judged, in 1801 Cartellier obtained wide recognition after exhibiting a plaster version of his statue of Modesty that was based on the free-standing statue of the Capitoline Venus in Rome. After the Bourbon Restoration, he was given a commission to sculpt the bronze equestrian statue of King Louis XIV that can be seen in the cour d'honneur of Versailles. At the time of Cartellier's death only the horse had been cast. His son-in-law Louis Petitot completed it with the king's figure.

Cartellier sculpted the model for the bronze statue of Dominique Vivant, baron Denon (1747–1825), that adorns his tomb at the Père Lachaise Cemetery in Paris. However, Cartellier's best known work came in 1825 when he was commissioned by Vivant's close friends Eugène and Hortense de Beauharnais who wanted him to sculpt a monument for the tomb of their mother, the Empress Joséphine. Cartellier's statue, modeled from Josephine's kneeling image in the painting of the coronation of Napoléon Bonaparte by Jacques-Louis David, can be seen at the Church of Saint-Pierre-Saint-Paul in Rueil-Malmaison.

Cartellier was made a member of the Institut de France and of the Legion of Honor (1808). He was elected an associated member of the Royal Institute of the Netherlands in 1808, and he was decorated with the Order of Saint Michael in 1824. He taught at the École des Beaux-Arts in Paris. His daughter married the painter Jean-François Heim, but she died at the age of nineteen.

Pierre Cartellier died in Paris in 1831 and was interred there in the Père Lachaise Cemetery with his wife and daughter.

== Principal works ==
The following works were singled out by art writer Charles Paul Landon in 1833:

- Aristide, placed in the Chambre des Pairs. Aristides was an Athenian soldier and statesman.
- Jeunes filles de Sparte dansant autour du statue de Diane ("Young girls of Sparta dancing before the altar of Diana"), bas-relief for the Salle de Diane, in the Napoleonic Musée des Antiques established in the Palais du Louvre; in situ.
- La Gloire distribuant des couronnes ("Fame distributing crowns"), bas-relief for the colonnade of the Louvre; in situ.
- Capitulation d'Ulm, bas-relief for the Arc de Triomphe du Carrousel erected in front of the Tuileries; in situ.
- General Valhubert, for the Pont de la Concorde, Paris, 1815; in the Jardin de l'Eveché, Avranches, Normandy) (illustration, above right)
- Minerve, frappant la terre ("Minerva striking the earth to generate the olive tree"), Versailles.
- Louis XIV, equestrian bas-relief for the Hôtel des Invalides.
- Empress Josephine, church at Rueil-Malmaison, near Paris.
- Two monuments to Louis XV, in bronze, one for the Place de Reims, the other for the Rond Point of the Champs-Élysées.
- La Pudeur ("Modesty"); exhibited at the Salon of 1801, in plaster, when it won a first prize, and of 1808, in marble, which was purchased for the gallery at Malmaison.
