= Porte du Peyrou =

Coordinates: 43°36′40″N 3°52′20.5″E

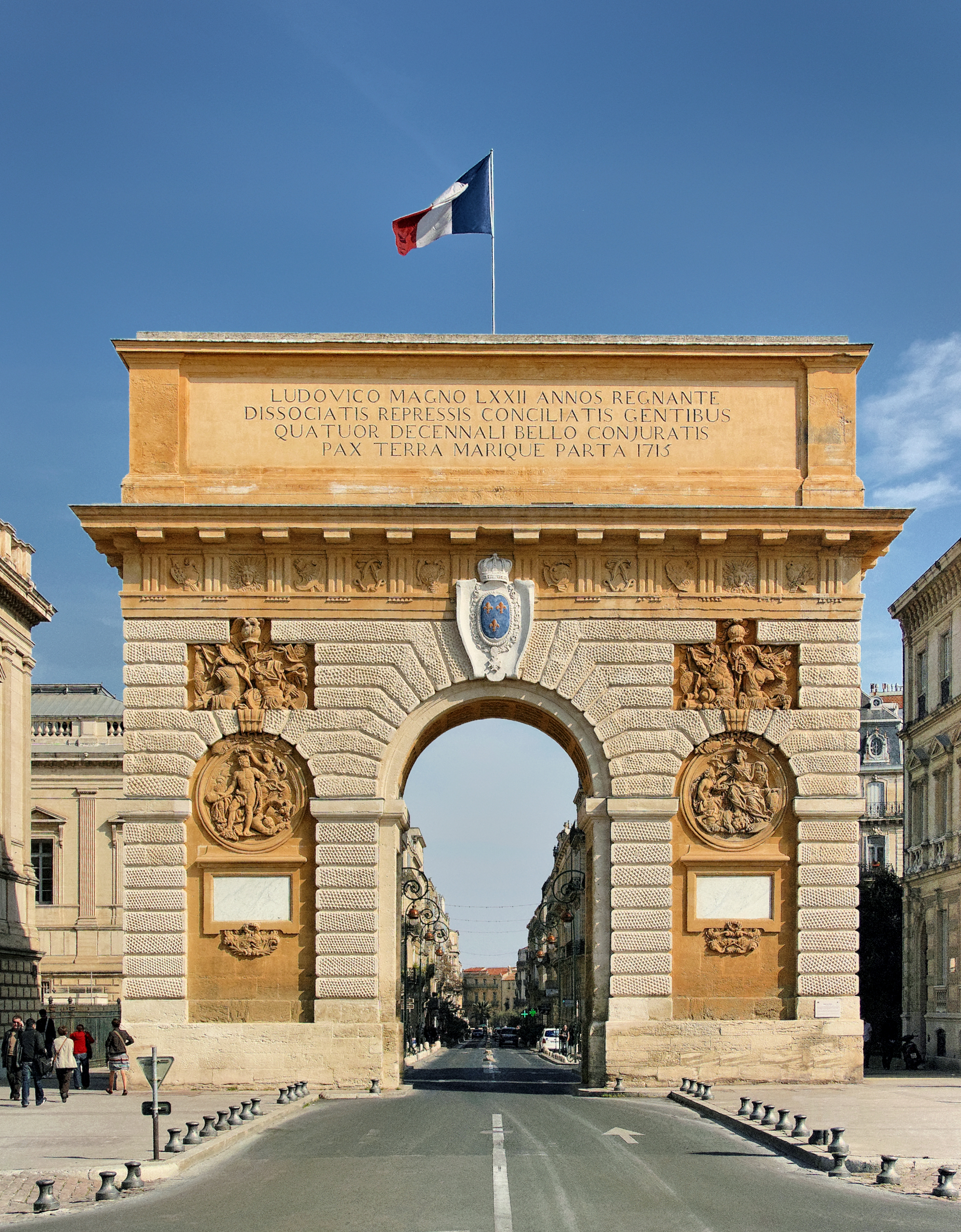
The Porte du Peyrou.

The Porte du Peyrou is a triumphal arch in Montpellier, in southern France. It is situated at the eastern end of the Jardin de Peyrou, a park near the center of the city.

The arch was designed by François Dorbay, after the model of the Porte Saint-Denis in Paris. Its construction was completed in 1693. Its rusticated surface is crowned by a Doric entablature, suitable to a martial monument. Its later panels in bas-relief and inscriptions glorifying King Louis XIV were added in 1715.

These reliefs show four major events from the reign of Louis XIV, rendered as allegories:

- the capture of Namur during the War of the Grand Alliance, in which the figure representing the Dutch Republic kneels before Louis XIV.
- Louis in the figure of Hercules being crowned by Victory.
- the digging of the Canal du Midi that links the Bay of Biscay with the Mediterranean Sea.
- the Revocation of the Edict of Nantes.
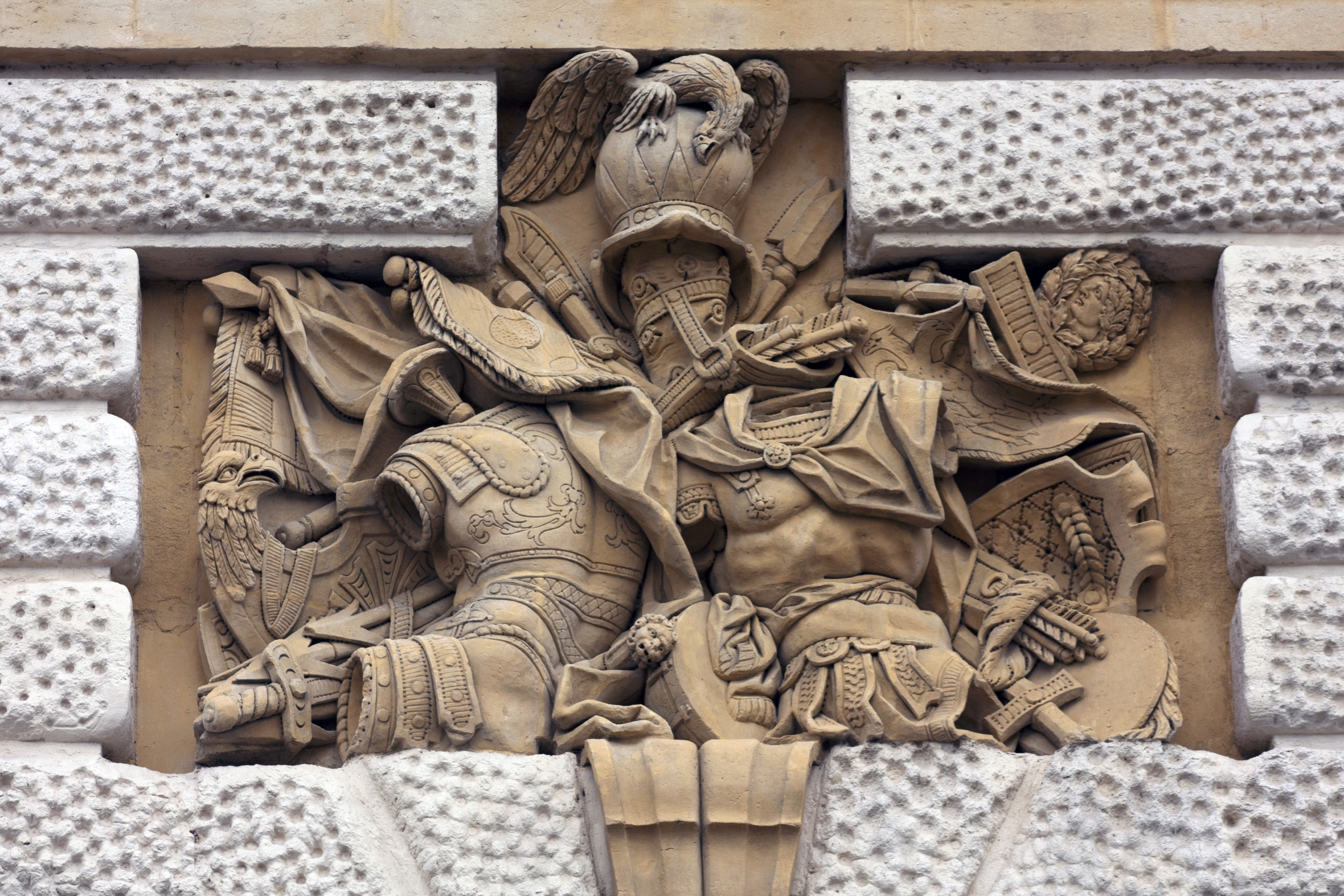

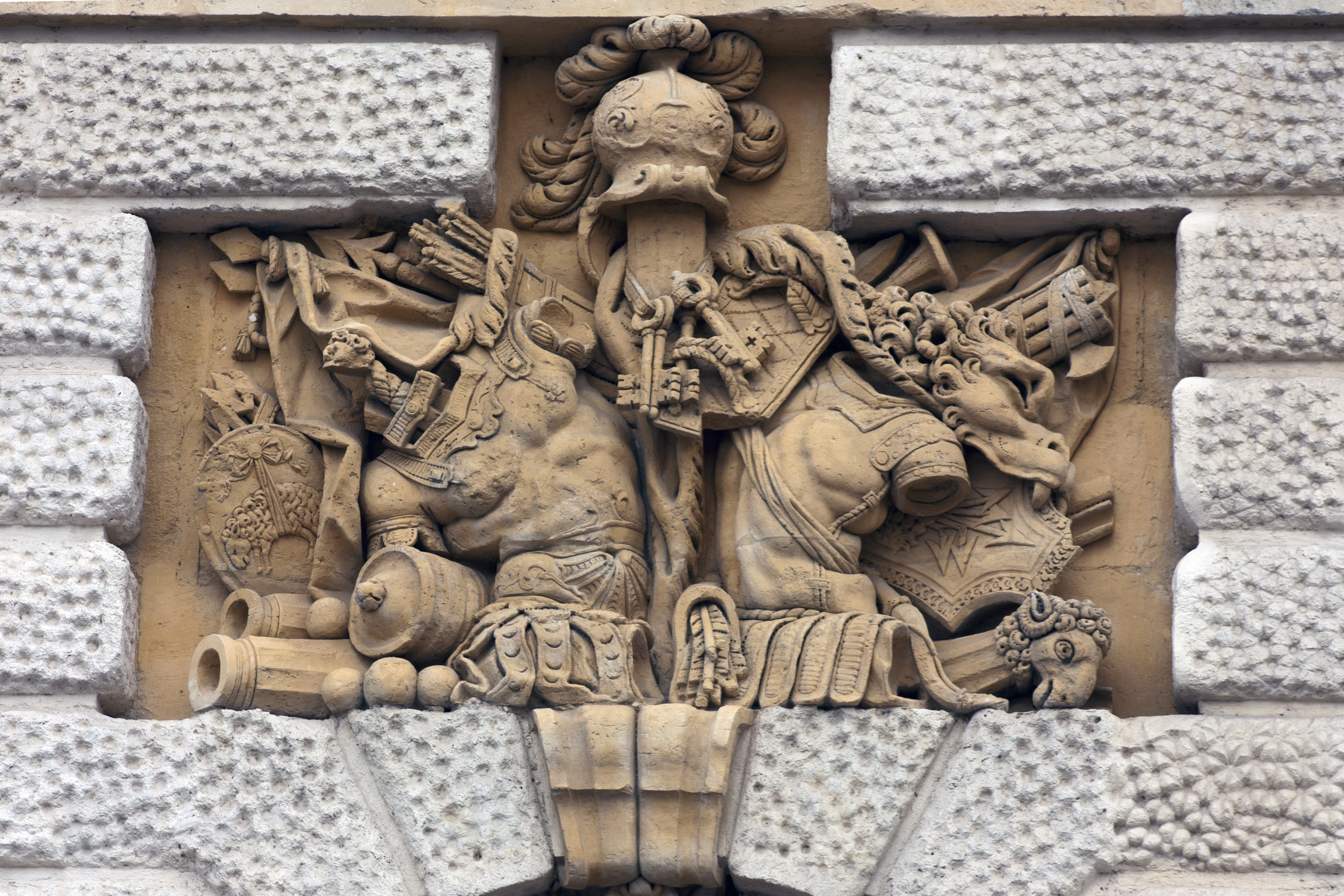

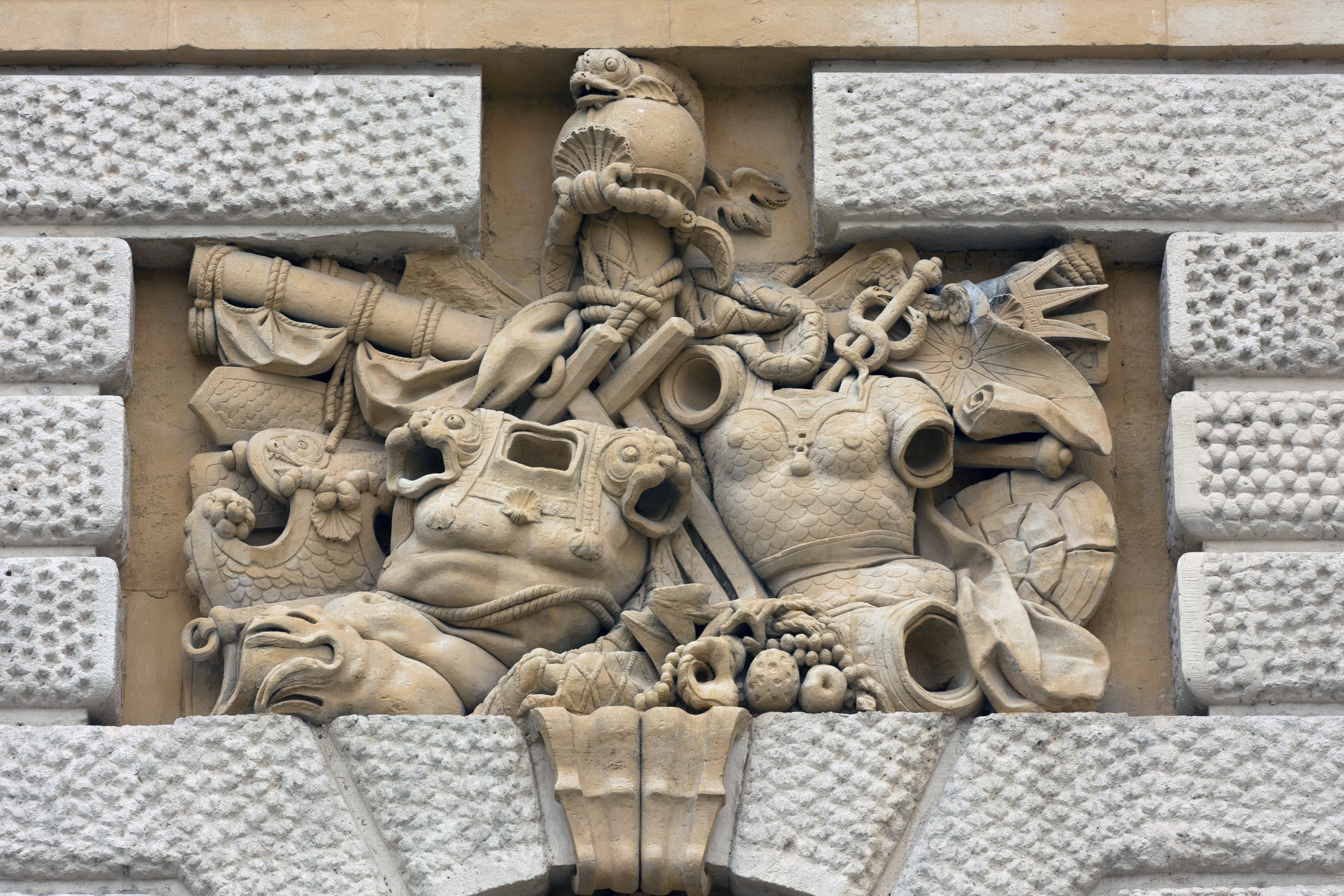

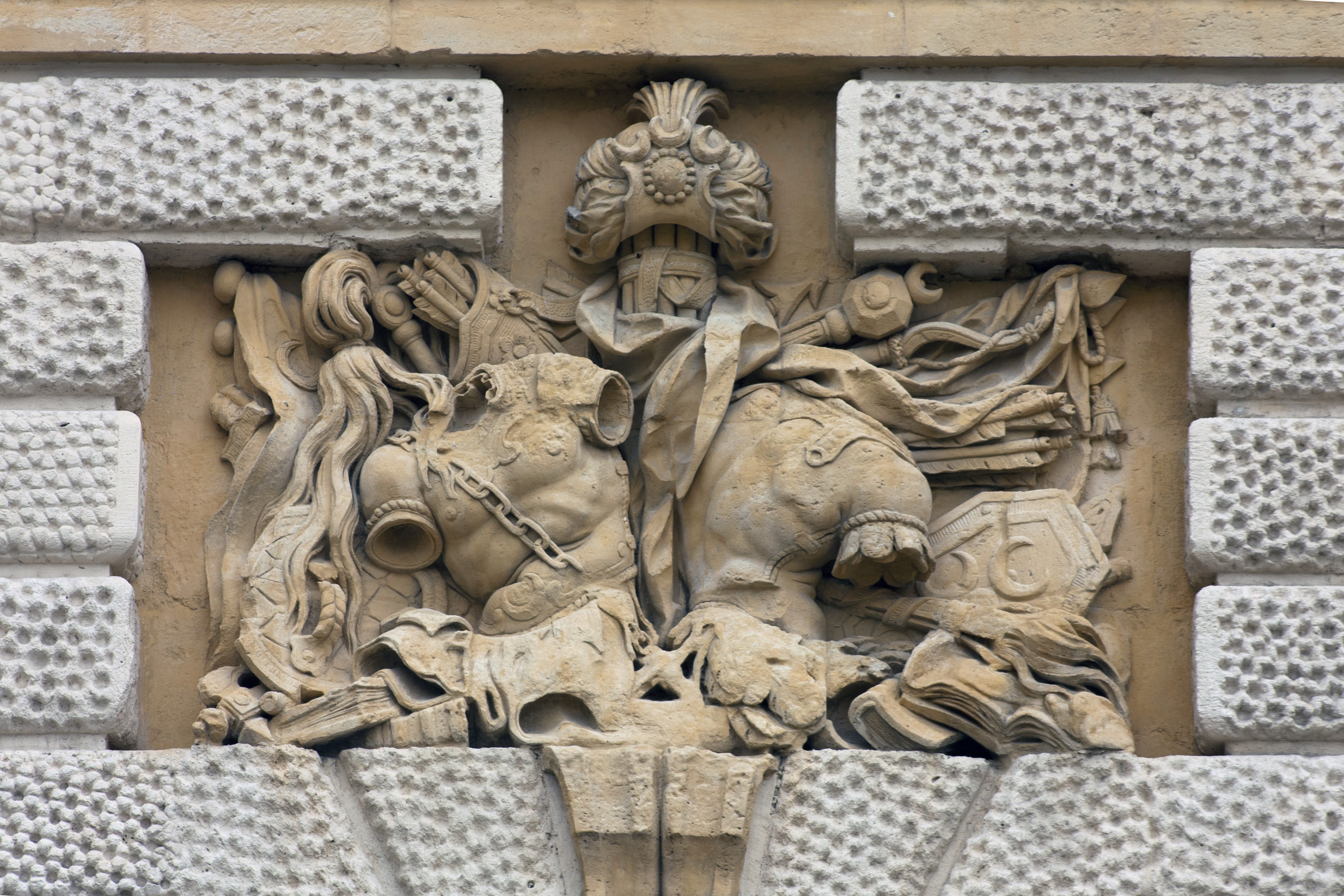
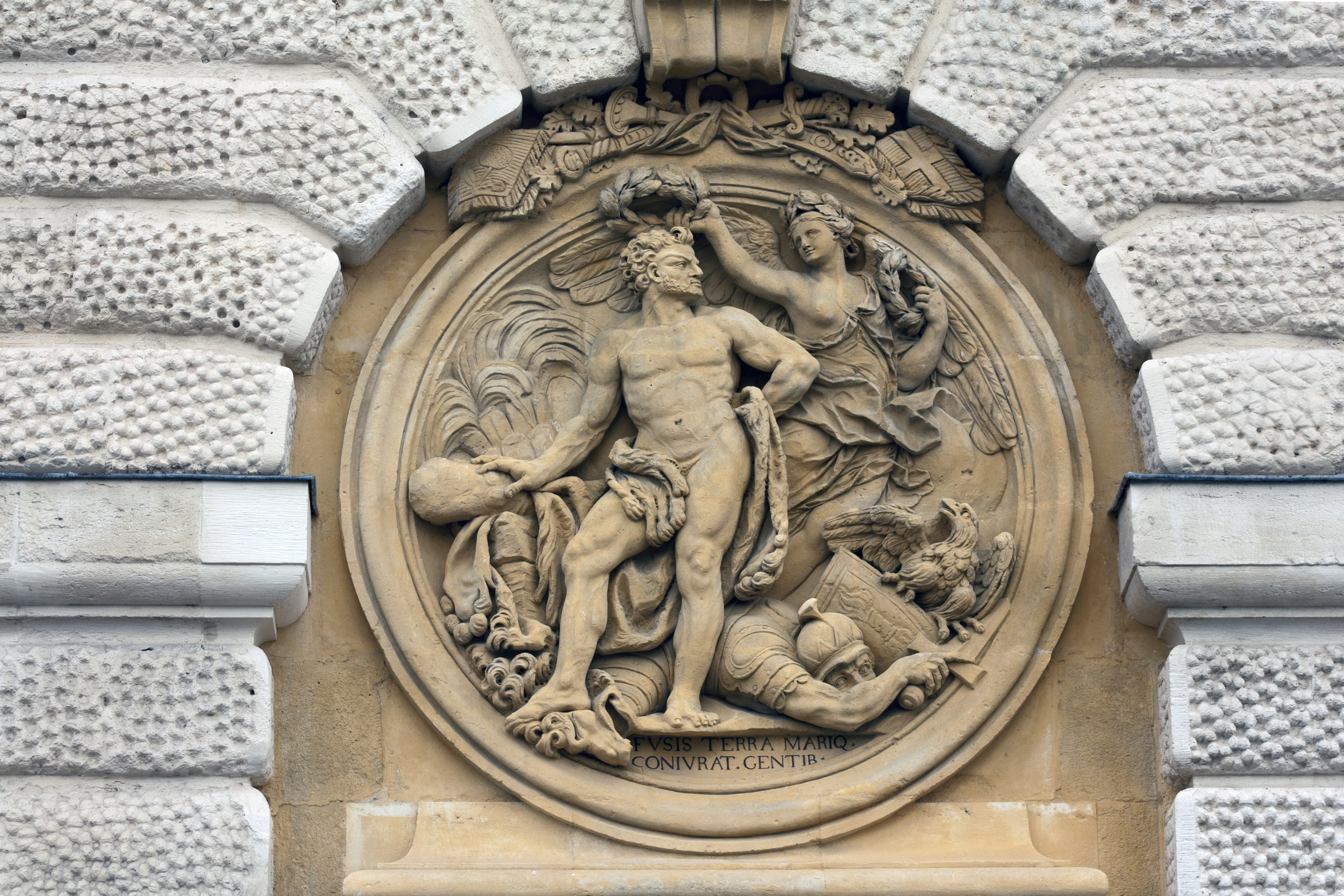

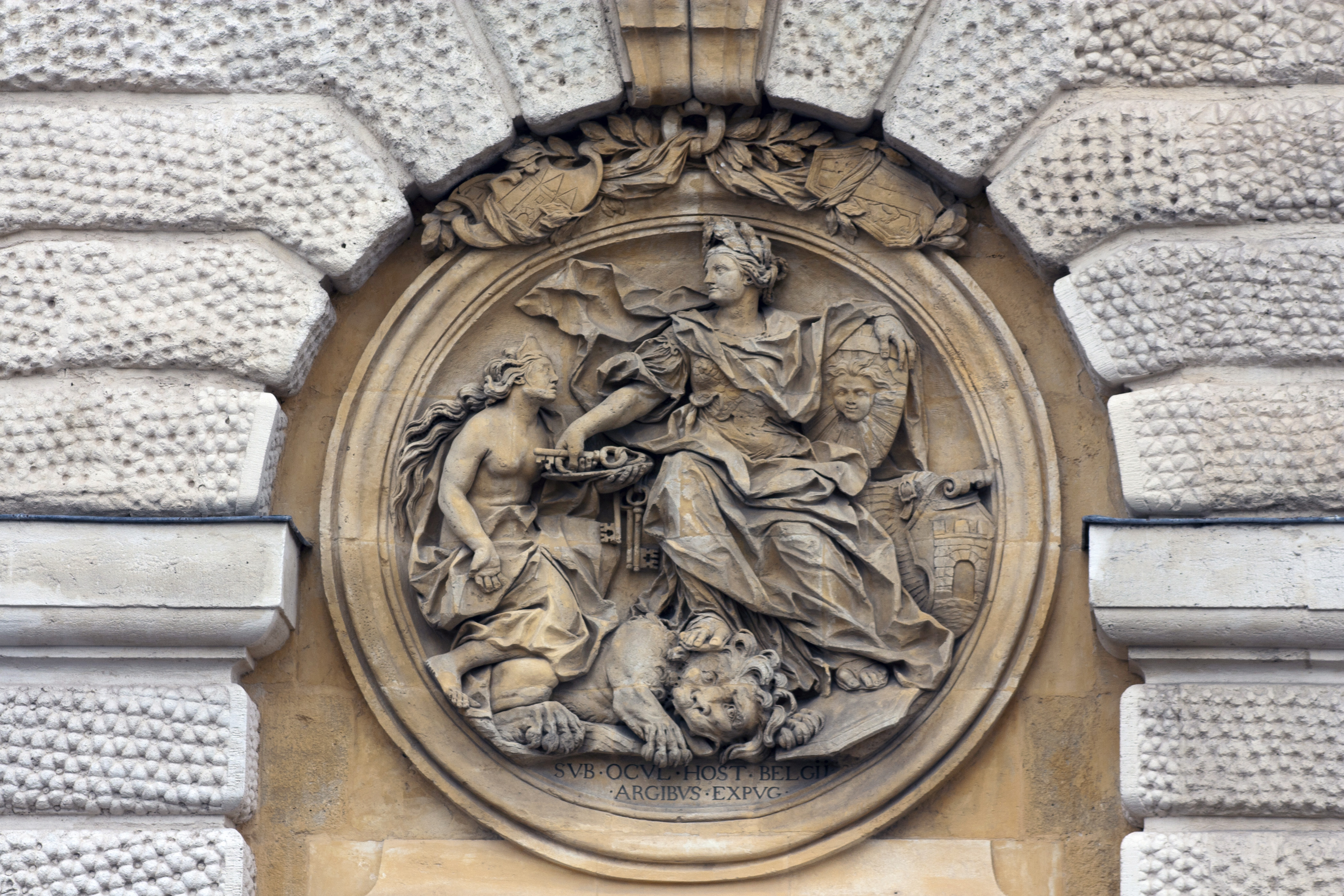

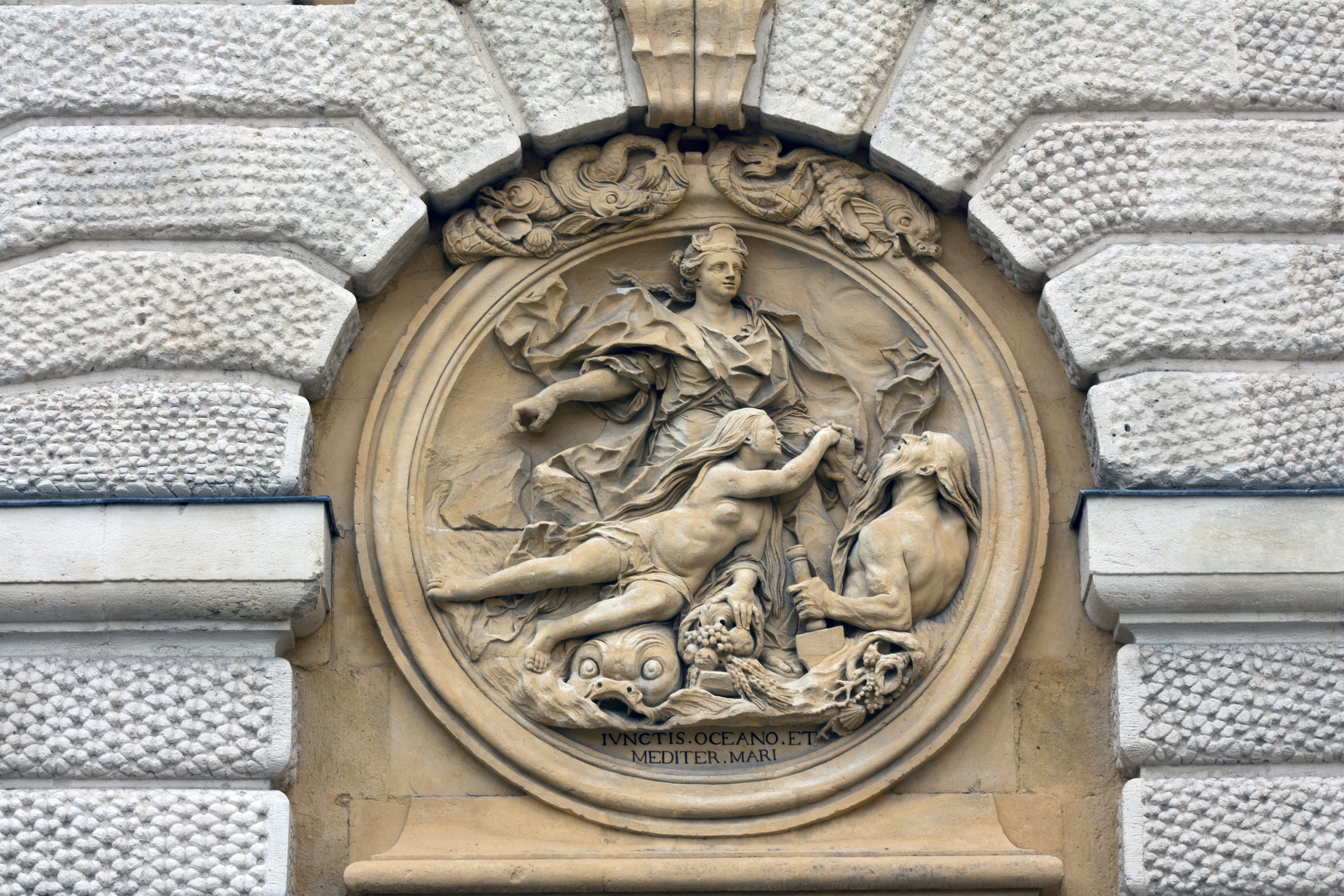

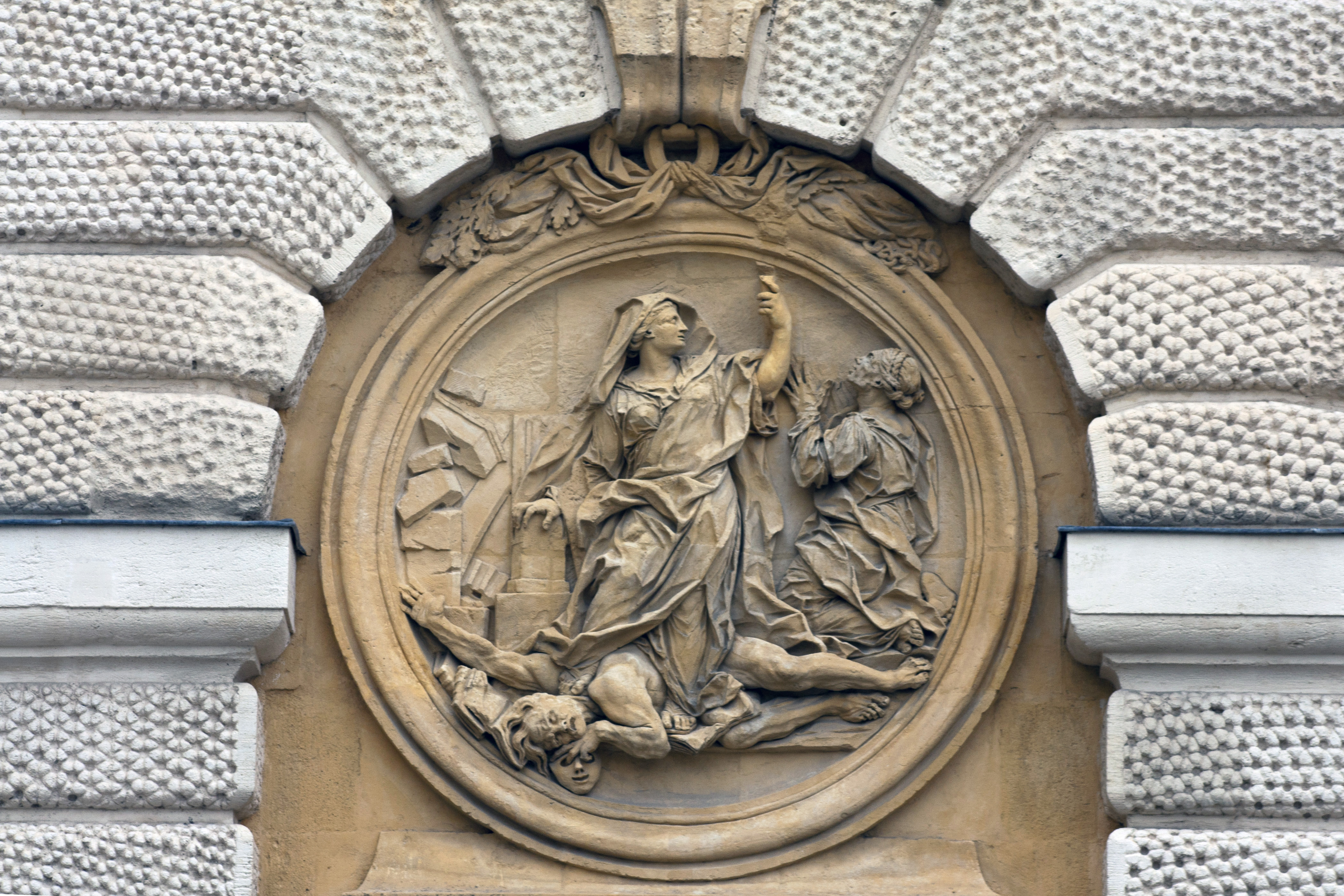

Montpellier as seen from the Porte du Peyrou.

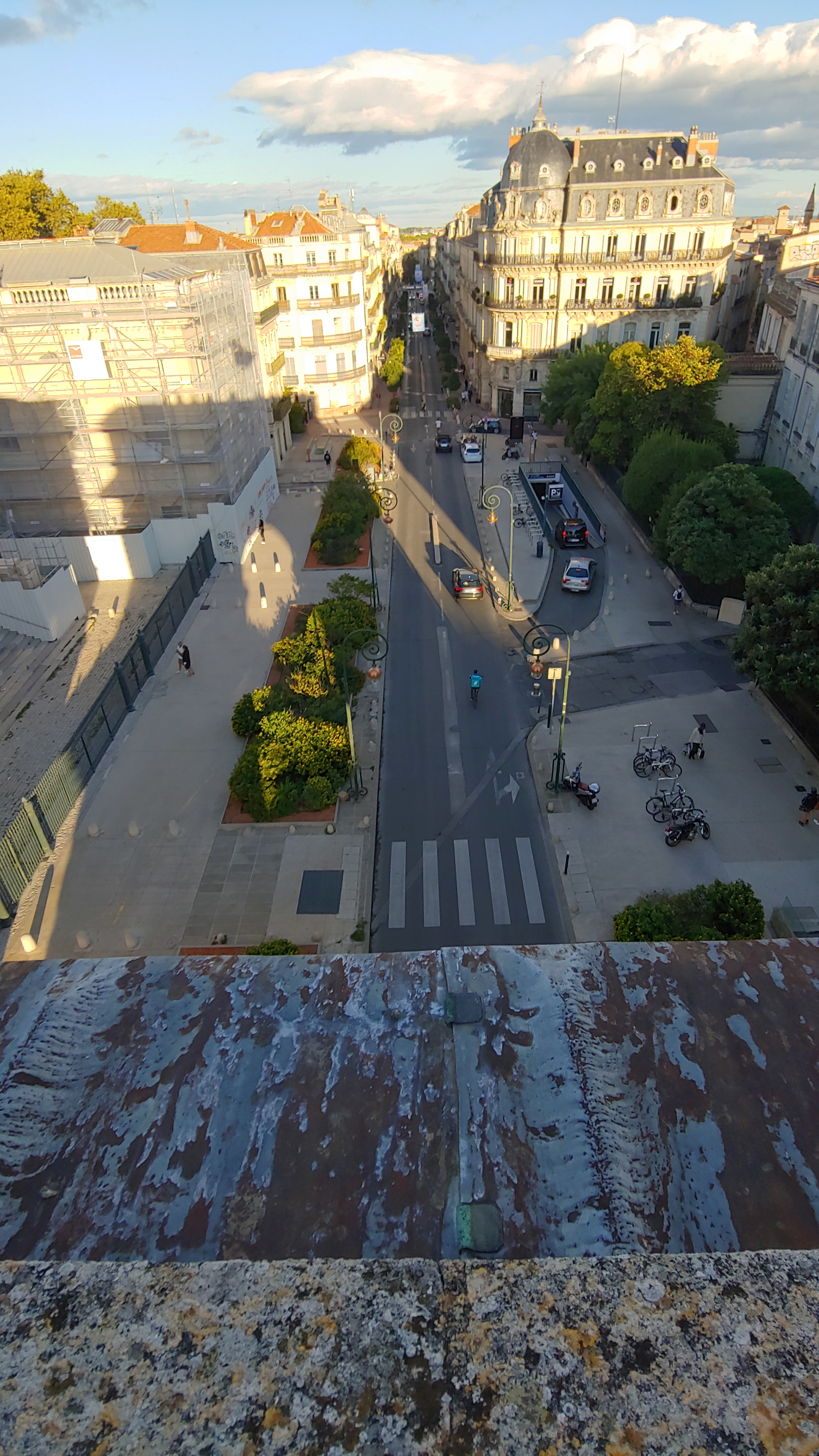
The Foch avenue as seen from the Porte du Peyrou.

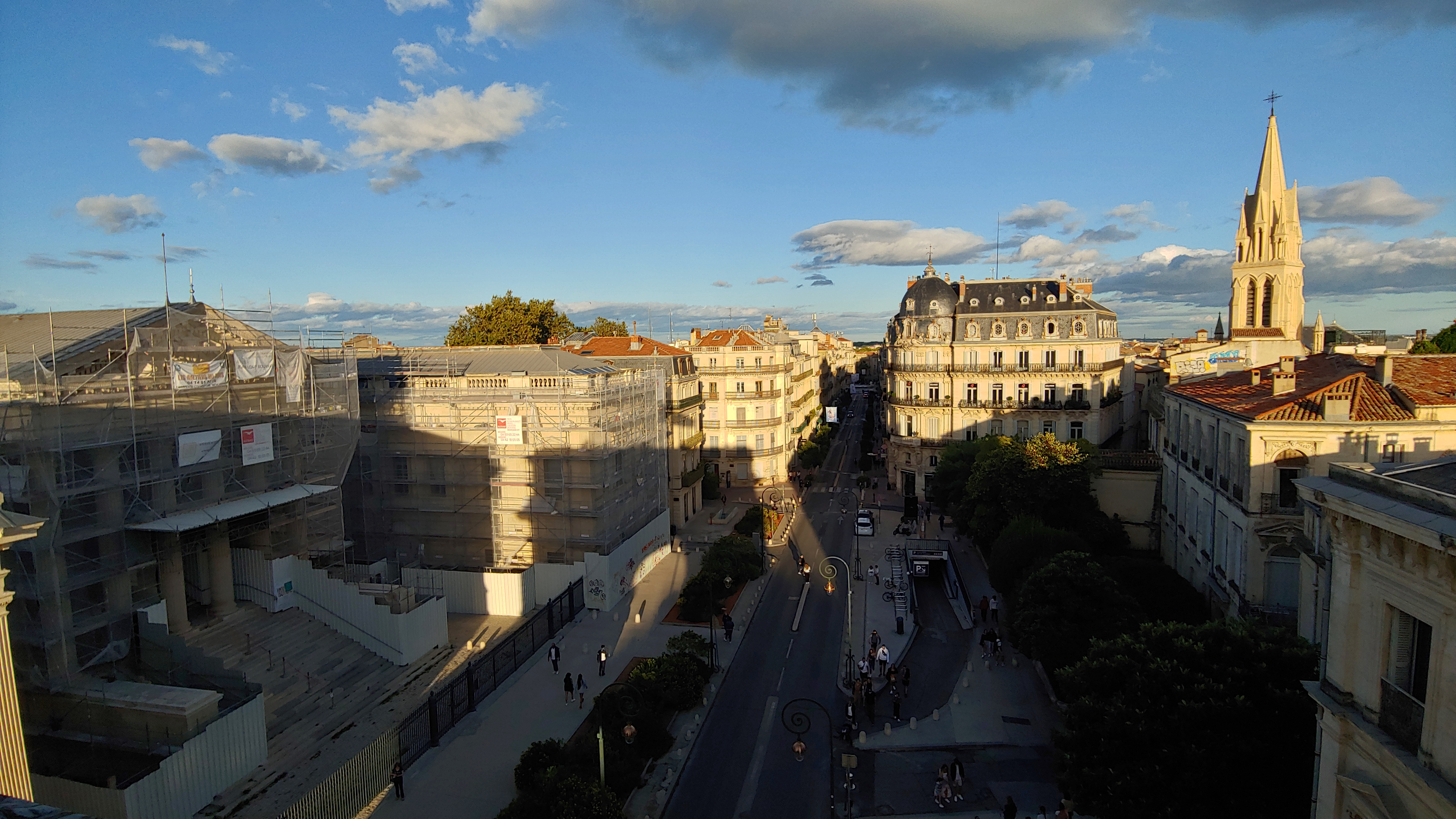
The Foch avenue as seen from the Porte du Peyrou.

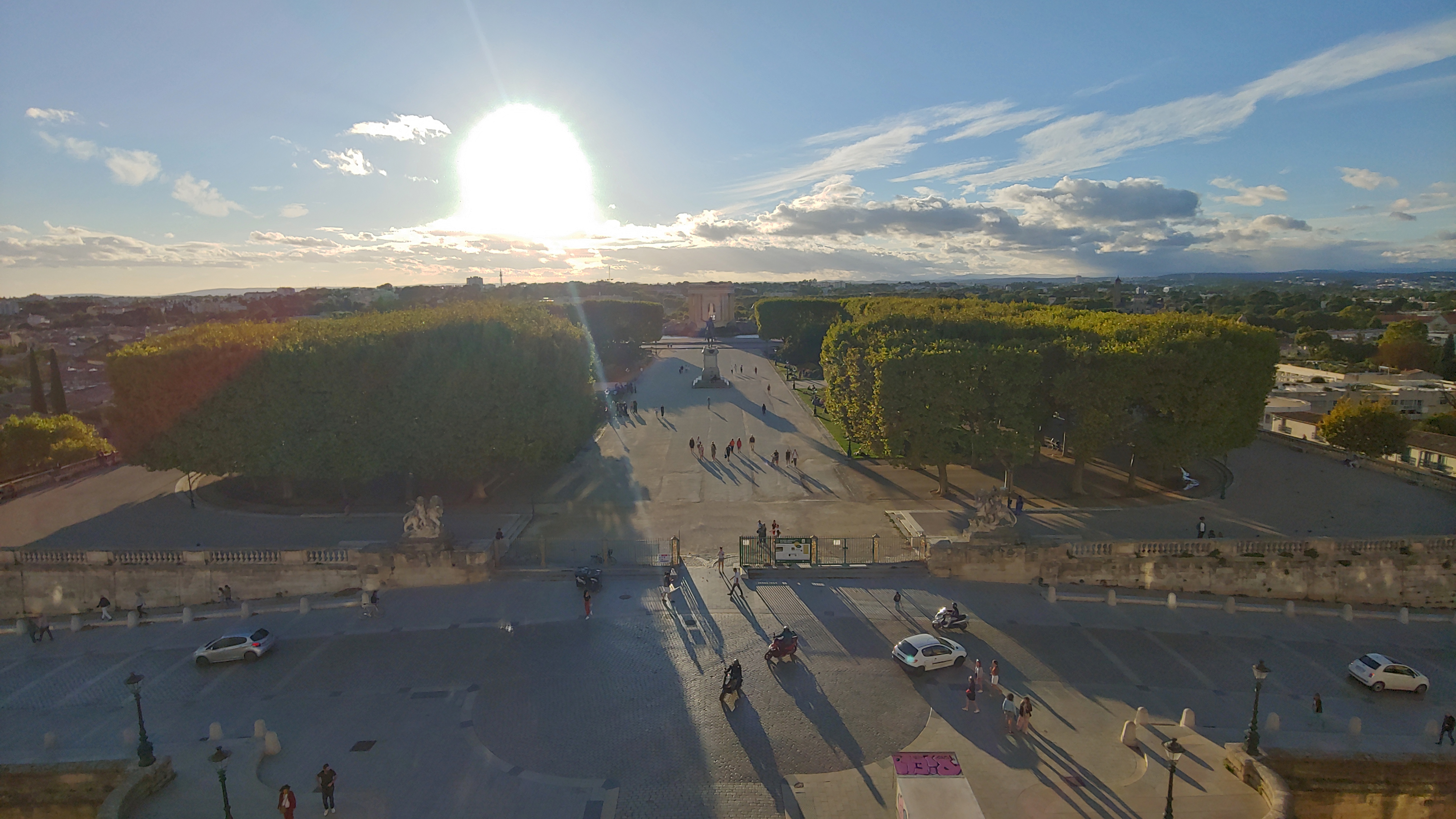
The Peyrou promenade as seen from the Porte du Peyrou.
