= Promenade du Peyrou =

The Promenade du Peyrou, also known as the Place Royale du Peyrou, is an esplanade located west of the Écusson district in the city of Montpellier (Hérault) in France, bordering the old "commune-cloture" wall.

The name Peyrou means "stony" in Occitan, the local language of the region in southern France.

This promenade, which is listed among the historical monuments of Montpellier, includes multiple monuments and structures. The promenade and its terraces was laid out in 1689. The grounds include Montpellier's version of the Arc d'Triomphe the Peyrou Gate, or the Triumphal Arch, with a bridge and access ramps, built in 1691. In the center of the promenade is a wide gravel area where many Montpelliérains gather to relax. In the middle is the equestrian statue of Louis XIV erected in 1718. The statue was designed in 1690 by François d'Orbay.

At the far end of the promenade is the Saint-Clément aqueduct and its reservoir built in 1753. Part of the promenade is enclosed in entrance gates which were installed in 1883. The water tower is connected to Montpellier's aqueduct system carrying water 14km from the Saint-Clément spring. The aqueduct was built in the 18th century.
