= Jean Baptiste Joseph De Bay père =

Flemish sculptor, museum conservator and art restorer (1779–1863)

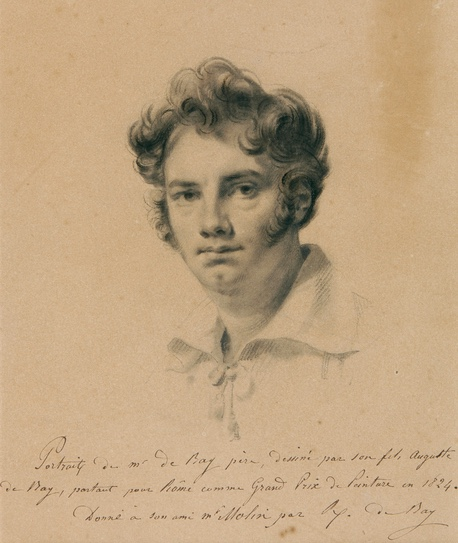
Auguste-Hyacinthe Debay, Joseph De Bay père

Jan Baptist Jozef de Bay, known as Jozef de Bay and Jean Baptiste Joseph de Bay the Elder, signed as De Bay Père (Mechelen, 16 October 1779 – Paris, 1863) was a Flemish sculptor, museum conservator and art restorer. After training in Mechelen, Nantes and Paris, he spent most of his active career in France where he executed many portrait sculptures in a classicist style. He became conservator of the collection of antique sculptures of the Louvre.

== Life ==
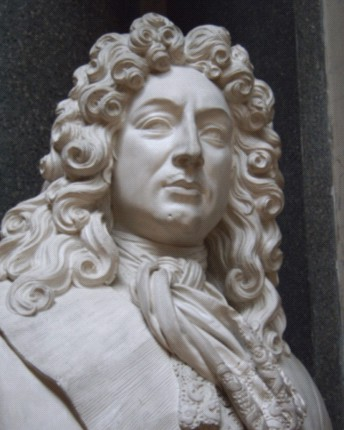
Portrait of Jean-Baptiste Cassagnet

He was the son of Philippus de Bay (1754–1810) and his wife Anna Catharina Taeymans. De Bay was a pupil of Willem Egidius van Buscum and Jan Frans van Geel in Mechelen and subsequently Antoine-Denis Chaudet at the École des Beaux-Arts de Paris. He was active in France where he first worked in Nantes from 1801. From 1817 he was in Paris where he became in conservator of the collection of antiquities of the Louvre.

He was awarded various distinctions including the titles of Knight of the Legion of Honour and Knight of the Order of Leopold.

In Paris he provided support and training to visiting sculptors from Mechelen such as Joseph Tuerlinckx and Louis Royer. He was the father of the sculptor Jean-Baptiste Joseph Debay (1802–1862) and the sculptor and painter Auguste-Hyacinthe Debay.

He died in Paris in 1863.

== Work ==
He is mainly known for portrait sculptures of historical and contemporary figures. His work was executed in a classicist style.

Jean Baptiste Joseph De Bay created statues of historical figures as well as a number of busts. Several of his works are exhibited at the Palace of Versailles, the Louvre museum in Paris, Fine Arts Museum of Nantes, Musée des Beaux-Arts d'Angers, and Musée des Beaux-Arts de Bordeaux.

He sculpted the ten statues in Palais de la Bourse (Nantes), the statue of Argus Asleep to the Sound of the Flute by Mercury in the Fine Arts Museum of Nantes, the statue of Pericles in the Tuileries Garden in Paris, the Equestrian statue of Louis XIV (Montpellier) in collaboration with Auguste-Jean-Marie Carbonneaux, the marble statues of Charles Martel in Versailles and of Colbert in the Luxembourg Palace in Paris.

He won the second prize in the Prix de Rome for sculpture in 1823.
