= Van Beveren =

Van Beveren is a surname. Notable people with the surname include:

- Charles Van Beveren (1809–1850), Belgian artist
- Jan van Beveren (1948–2011), Dutch footballer and manager
- Mattheus van Beveren, 17th-century Flemish sculptor and medallist
- Nicolas van Beveren (born 1982), Seychellois-born French actor and film director
- Wil van Beveren (1911–2003), Dutch sprinter

== See also ==
- Beveren (disambiguation)
