= Tuerlinckx =

Tuerlinckx is a surname. Notable people with the surname include:

- Joëlle Tuerlinckx (born 1958), Belgian artist
- Joseph Tuerlinckx (1809–1873), Flemish sculptor
