= Blauwbrug =

Historic bridge in Amsterdam

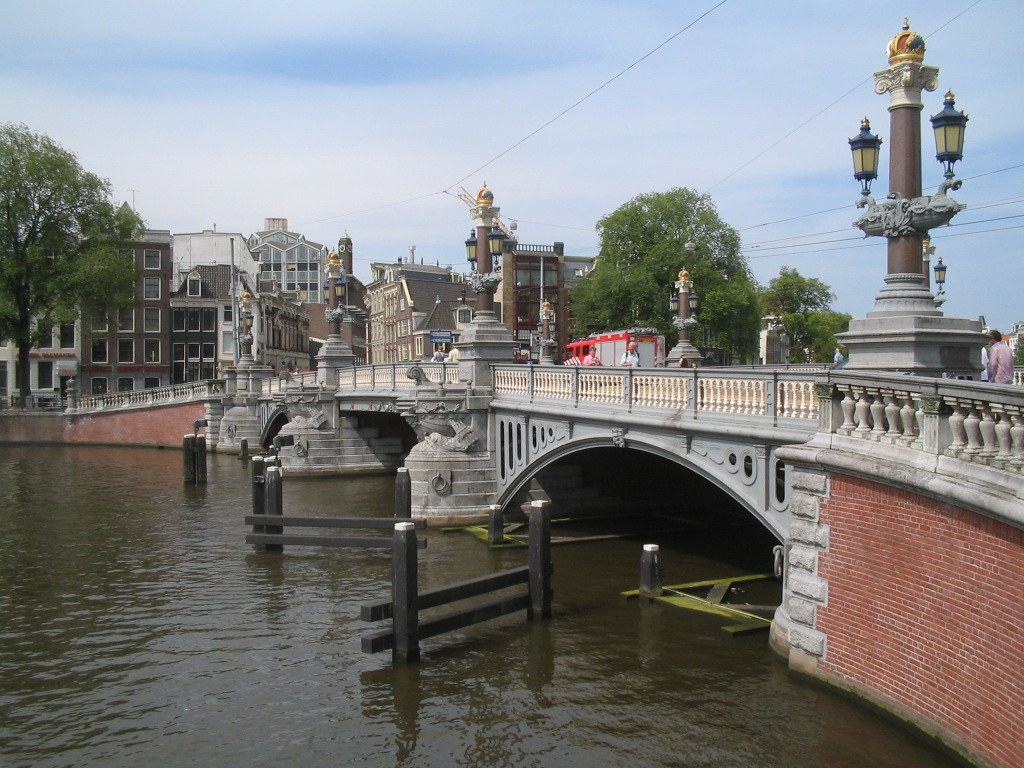
- The Blauwbrug in 2005
- Coordinates: 52.3663°N 4.9009°E
- Crosses: Amstel
- Locale: Amsterdam, Netherlands

The Blauwbrug (English: Blue bridge) is a historic bridge in Amsterdam, Netherlands over the river Amstel. It connects the Rembrandtplein area with the Waterlooplein area, and lies south to the Stopera.

The bridge owes its name to a wooden "blue bridge" that was there from around 1600 but no longer exists and which was painted the characteristic blue of the Dutch flag. It kept the name after 1883 when it was replaced by the spans of a new bridge which is inspired by the architecture of several of the bridges over the Seine in Paris such as Pont Alexandre III.

The stone bridge has three openings for ships and is richly decorated. The bases are formed like ships' bows and on top columns with leaf-motifs, masks and finally the Imperial Crown of Austria, as also present in the city's coat of arms. Also the lantern poles have shipping decorations and the lanterns themselves are again in the shape of crowns. The bridge carries a road which is also used by the tramway.

== In culture ==
The title of A. F. Th. van der Heijden's controversial 1983 novel De Slag om de Blauwbrug refers to this bridge.

== Gallery ==
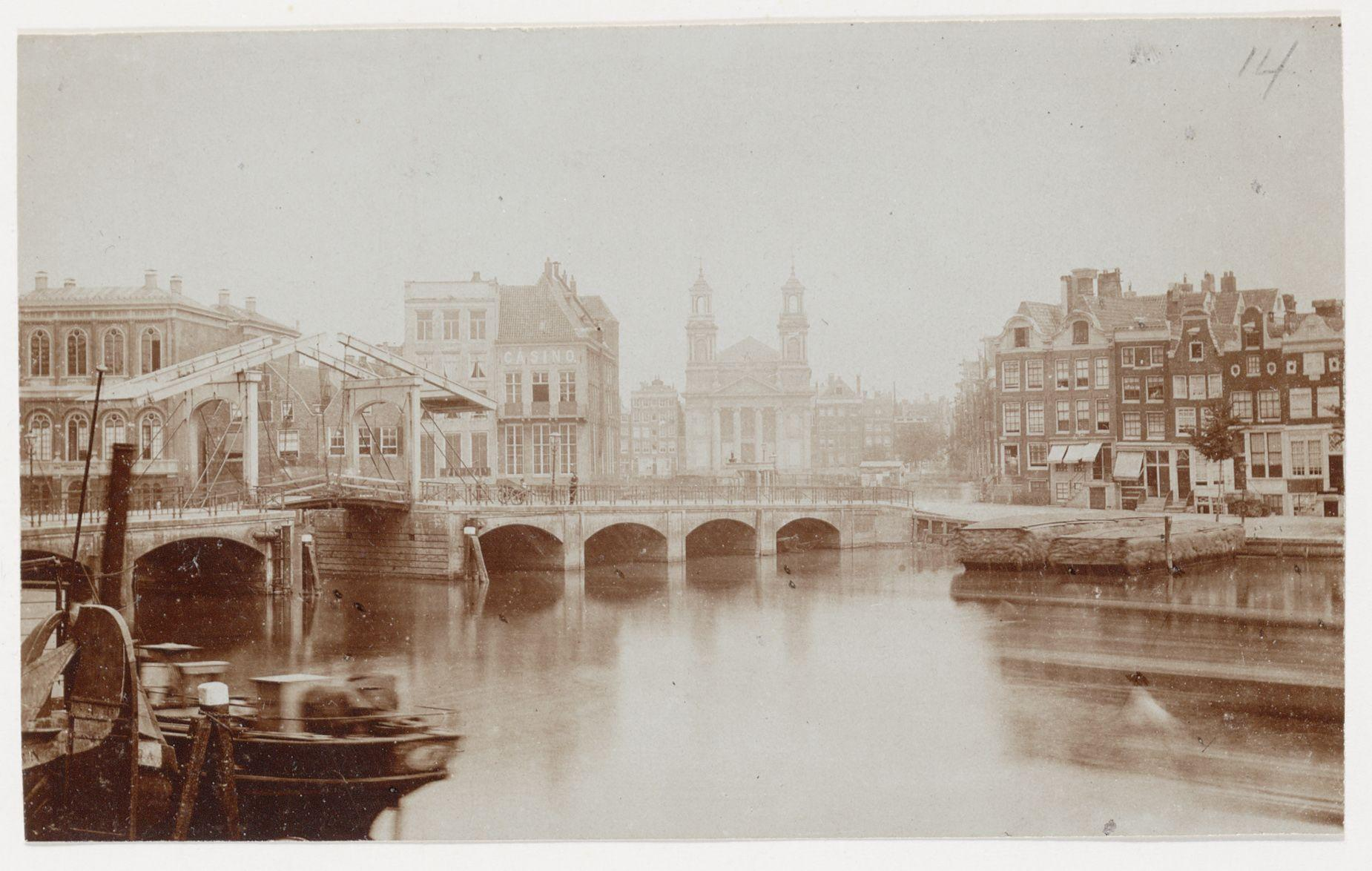
The Blauwbrug before 1883

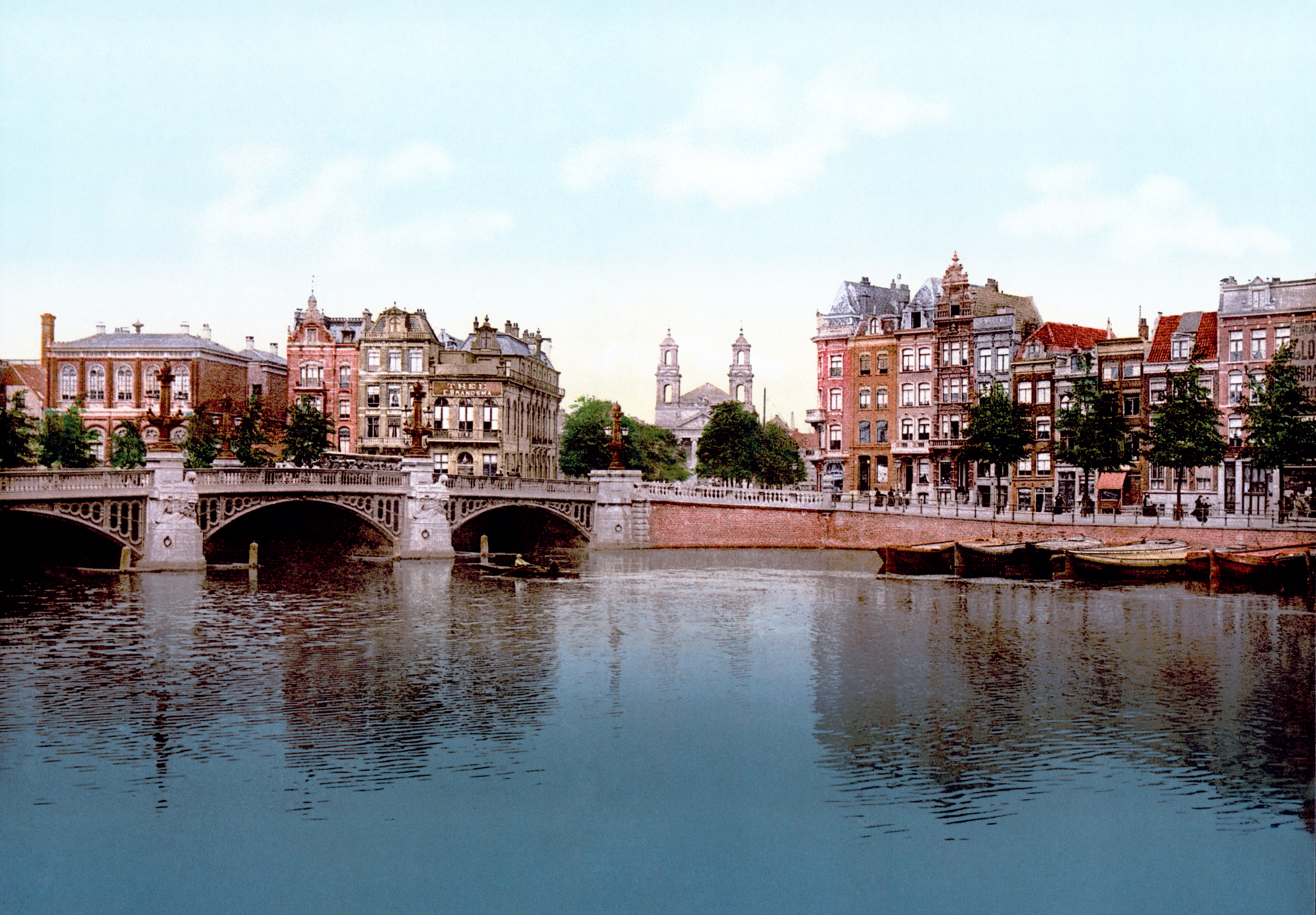
The Blauwbrug in circa 1905

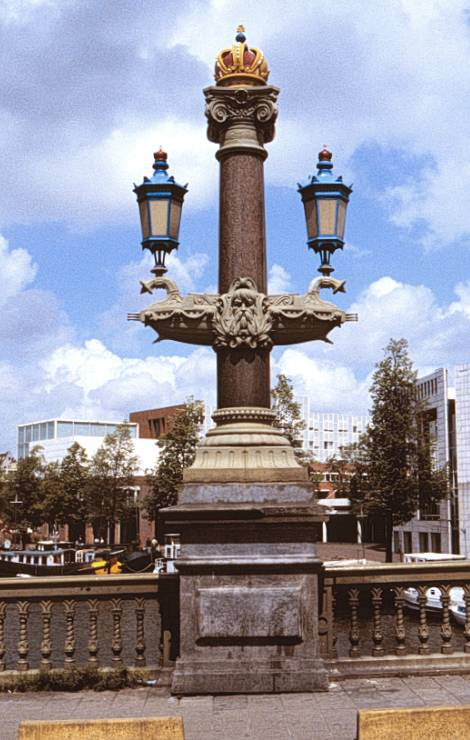
Monumental lantern with Imperial crown on the Blauwbrug

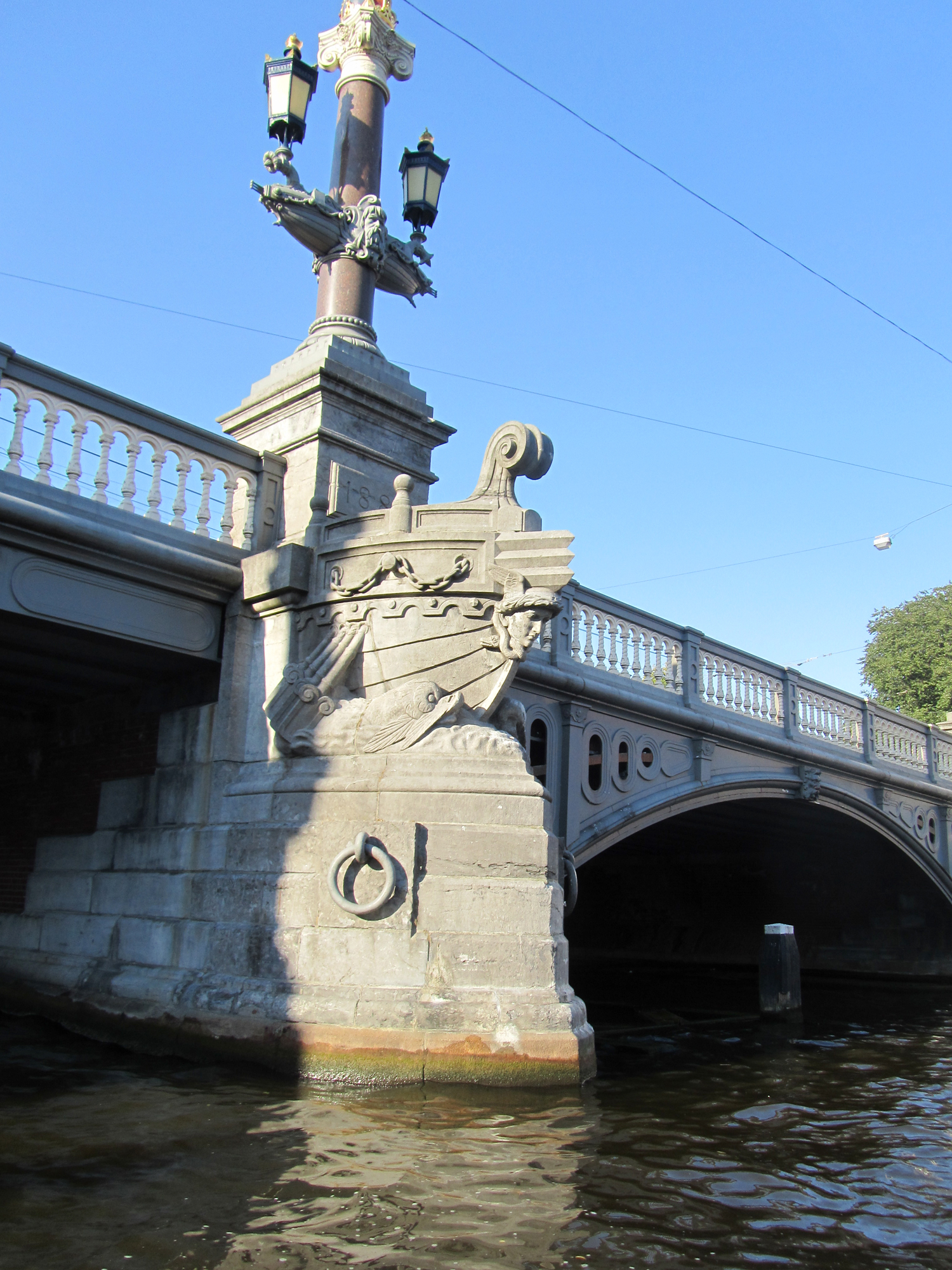
South side of the Blauwbrug seen from the Amstel

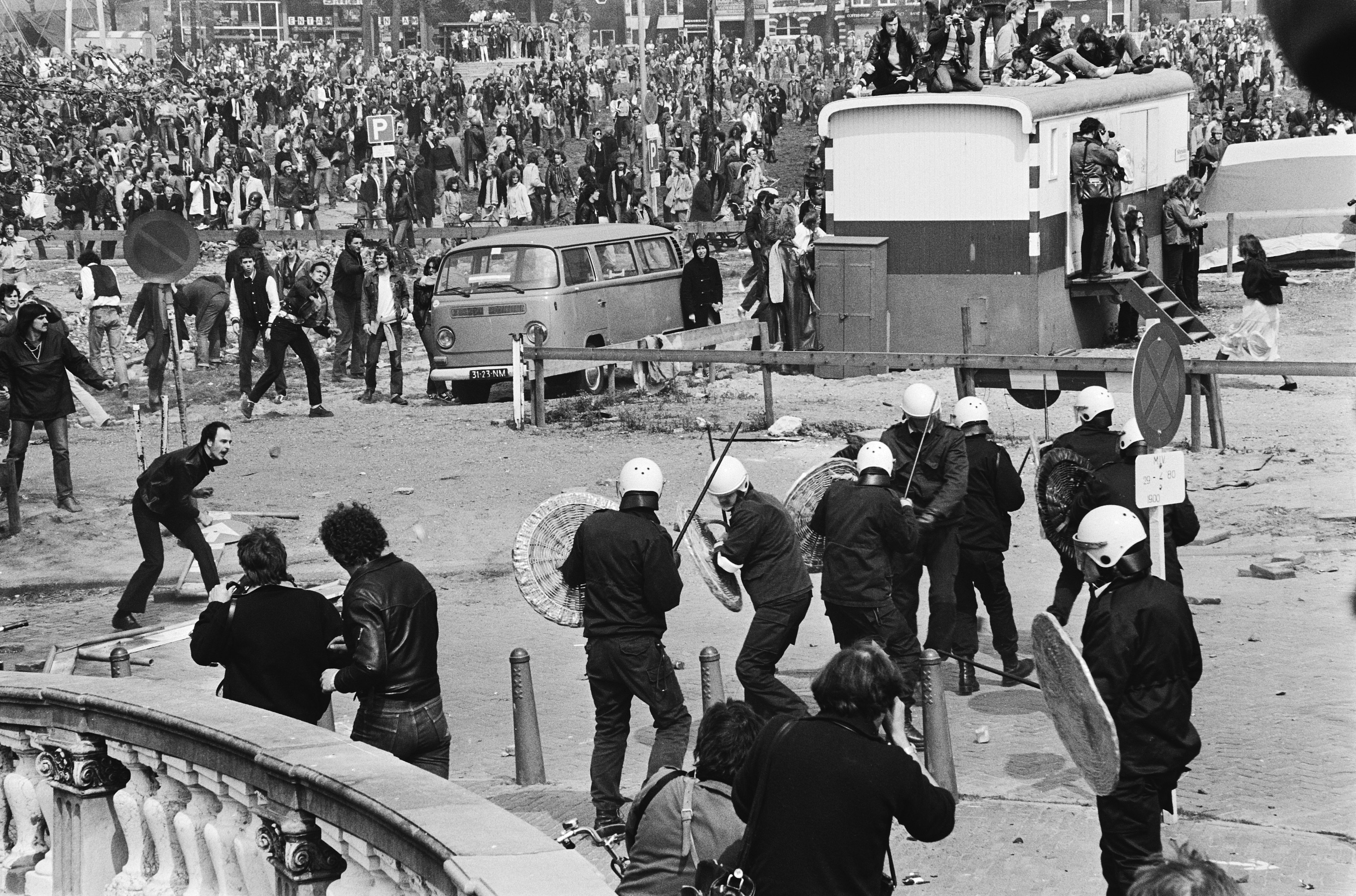
Riot on the Blauwbrug in 1980

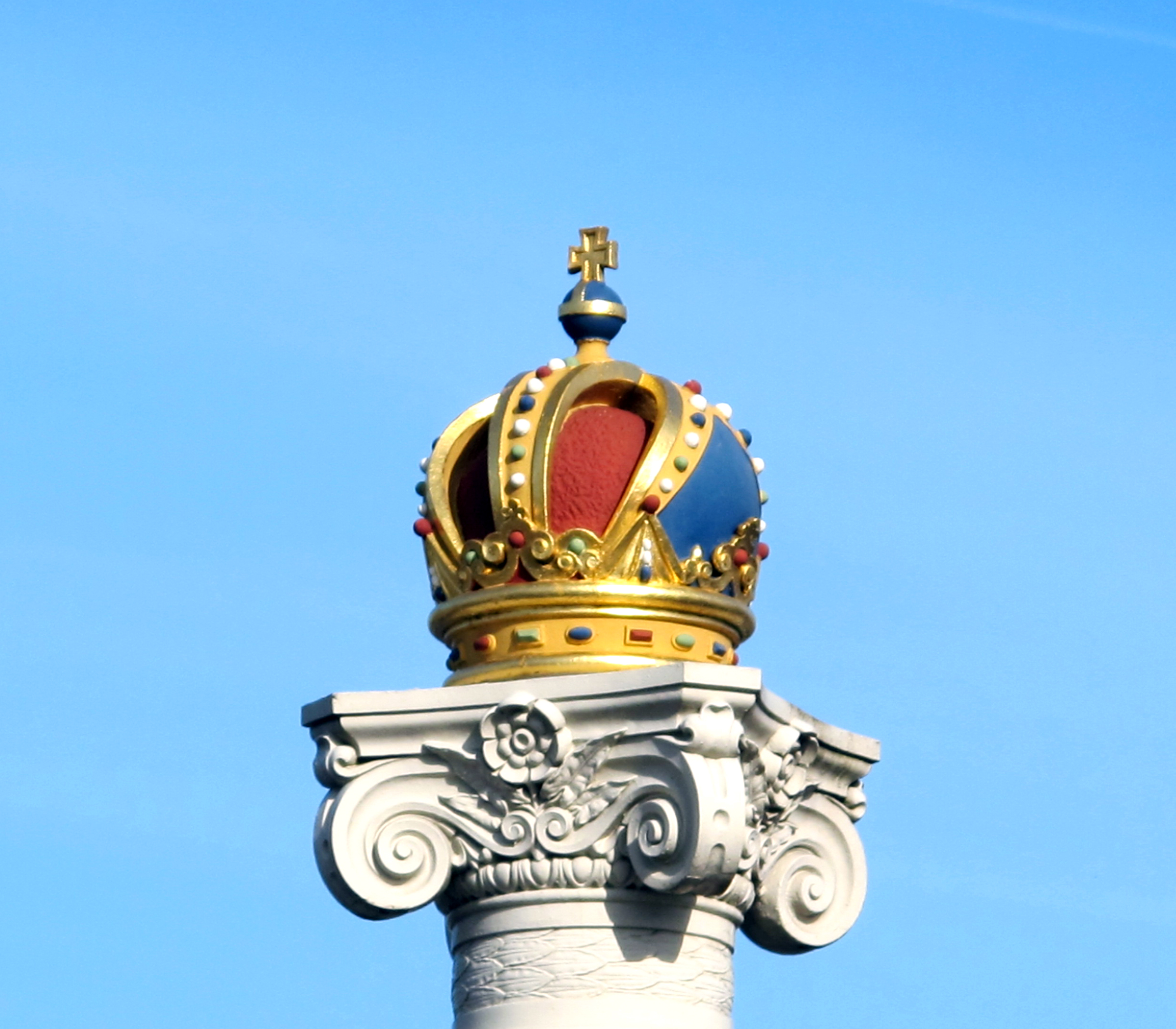
Close-up of Imperial crown lanterns on the Blauwbrug in 2014

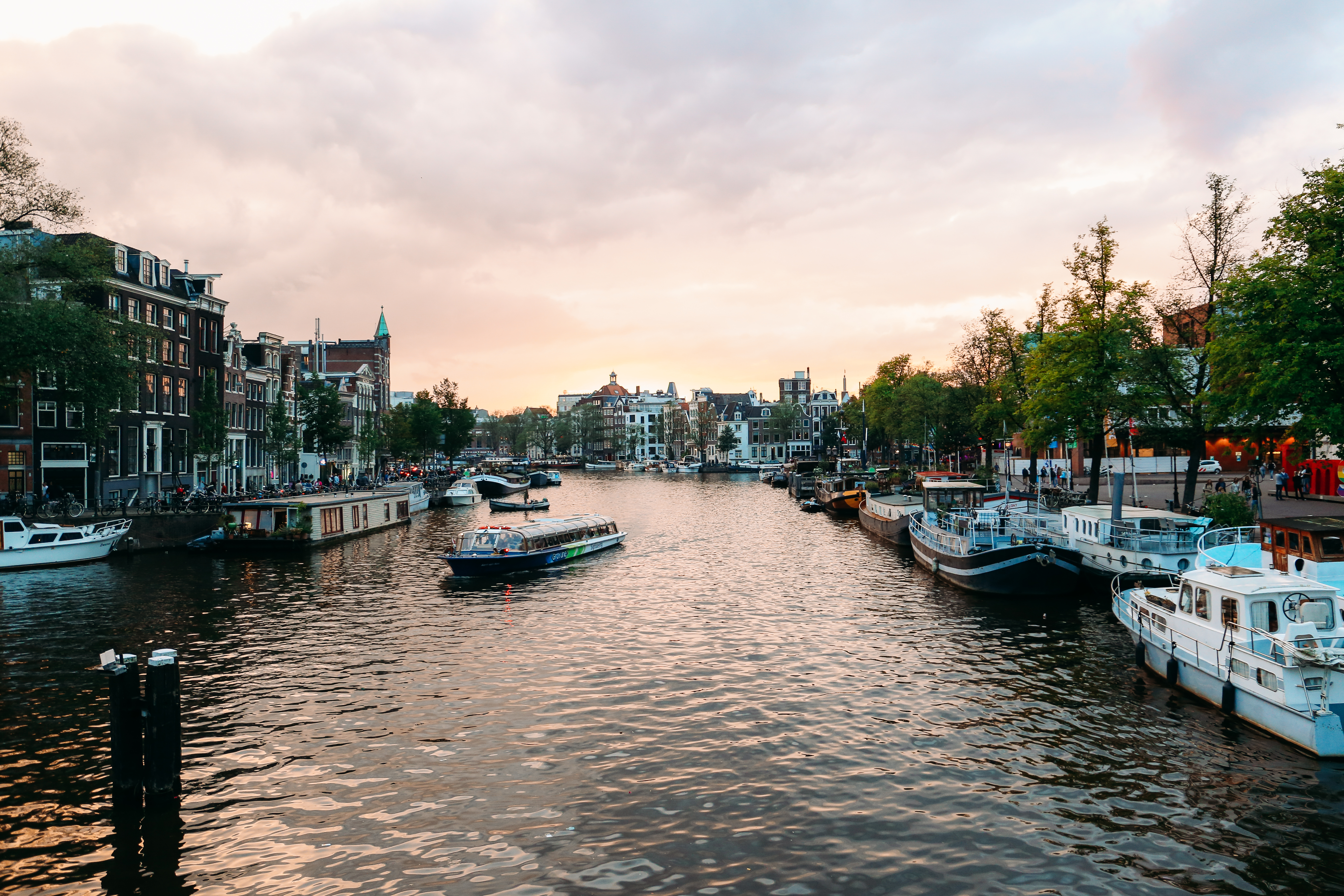
View of the Amstel from the Blauwbrug in 2017
