= Rembrandtplein =

Square in Amsterdam, Netherlands

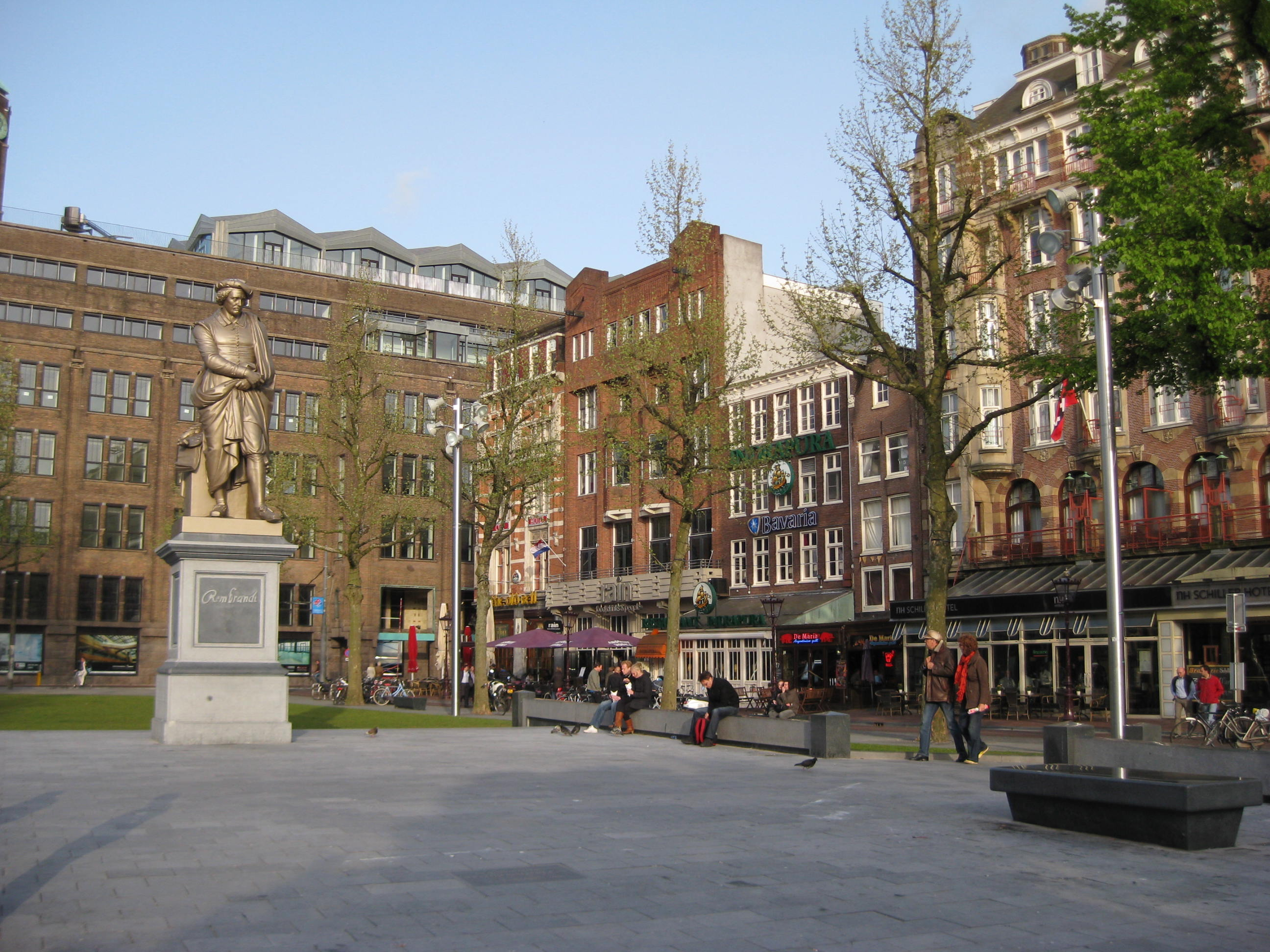
- Rembrandtplein in 2010

- Location within Amsterdam
- Namesake: Rembrandt van Rijn
- Location: Centrum, Amsterdam, Netherlands
- Nearest metro station: Waterlooplein
- Coordinates: 52°21′58″N 4°53′48″E

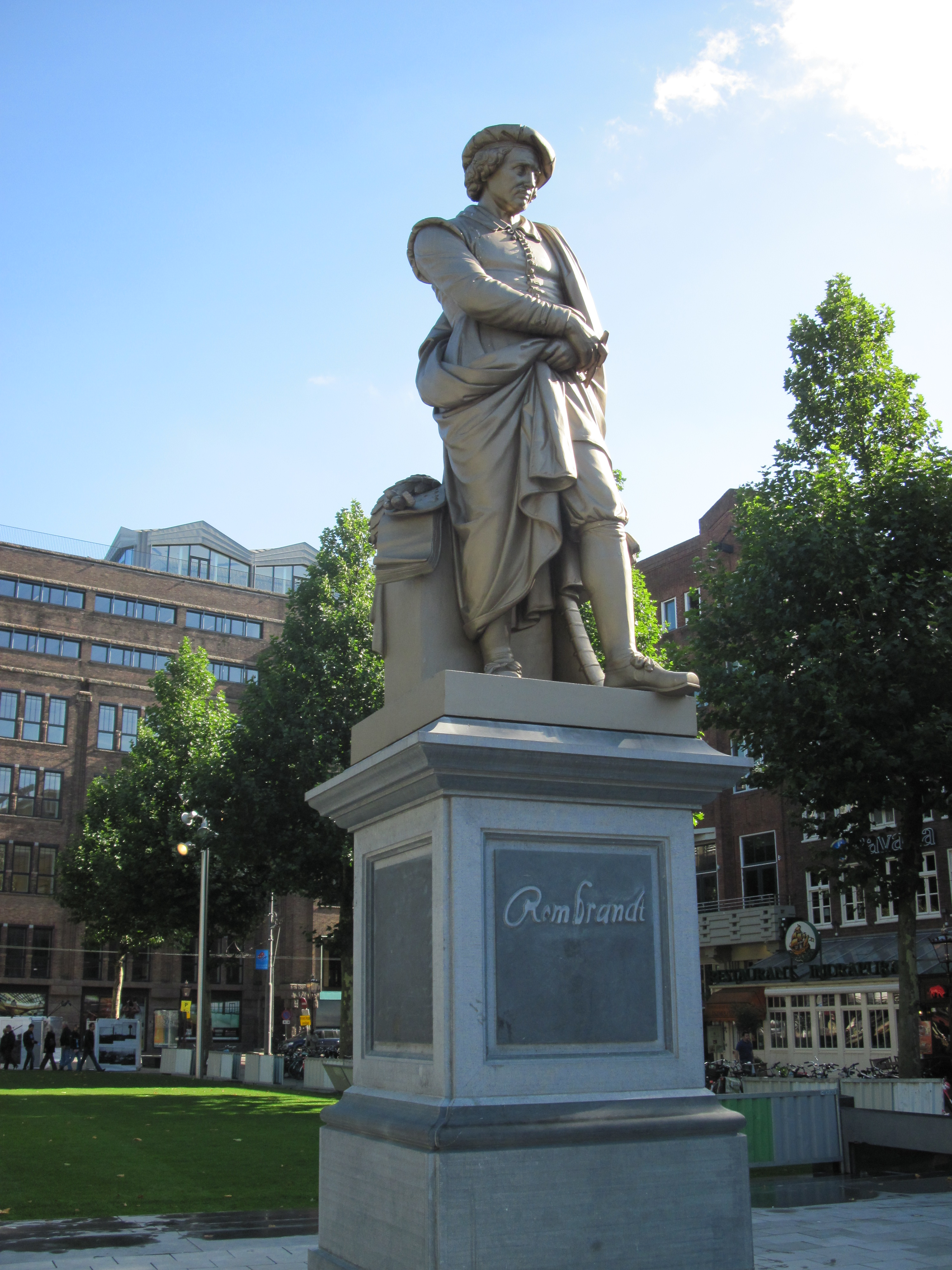
Rembrandt on Rembrandtplein

Rembrandtplein (English: Rembrandt Square) is a major square in central Amsterdam, Netherlands, named after Rembrandt van Rijn who owned a house nearby from 1639 to 1656.

== History ==
The square has its origins in the defensive walls constructed in the Middle Ages to protect the city. The site of Rembrandtplein held a Regulierspoort or gateway into the city. By 1655, the city had expanded beyond this area and it began to attract visiting farmers who brought their butter, dairy and poultry products to sell in the city and it became known as Botermarkt or butter market. By 1668, the Regulierspoort housed a Waaggebouw or weigh house. Each autumn, the square hosted a fair and the farmers' stalls were replaced by dance orchestras and circus tents. The market continued under this name until 1876 when a statue of Rembrandt by sculptor Louis Royer was moved from the perimeter to the centre of the square and it was renamed Rembrandtplein (Rembrandt Square).

By the early twentieth century, the square developed into a centre for nightlife drawing artists, young people and laborers. To serve these visitors, several hotels, cafés and entertainment venues opened in the adjoining streets. The area continues to be popular with residents and tourists.

== Adjacent area ==
The square is bordered on the east by Utrechtsestraat, Reguliersdwarsstraat on the south, Regulierbreestraat on the north and Halvemaansbrug on the west. The largest building on the square, across Utrechtsestraat, was designed in 1926 by architects Bert Johan Ouëndag and Hendrik Petrus Berlage as the head office of the Amsterdamsche Bank, later ABN AMRO. ABN AMRO vacated the structure in 2002 and in 2011 it reopened as retail office building named simply The Bank with 25,000 m^{2} (270,000 sq ft) of space after a five-year renovation.

Thorbeckeplein, named after politician Johan Rudolf Thorbecke (1798–1872), is adjacent to the south, and leads to Herengracht.

Tram lines 4, 9 and 14 operate on Regulierbreestraat and connect Rembrandtplein to the Stopera, northwest across the Blauwbrug (Blue Bridge) on the Amstel River, Dam Square to the northeast, and Amsterdam Centraal railway station.

== Design ==
In December 2006, the square became home to a large interactive LCD-screen. The display measures 7.6 m × 15 m (25 ft × 49 ft) and, in addition to programmed advertisements, allows passers-by to upload videos with a Bluetooth enabled mobile phone. At the time of installation, the screen was the largest in Europe at 114 m^{2} (1,230 sq ft).

The statue of Rembrandt was made in 1852 by sculptor Louis Royer and is of cast iron. It was cast in one piece and it is Amsterdam's oldest surviving statue in a public space. The current design of the square is the result of a €3.5 million renovation completed in December 2009. The statue is on a grey granite base bearing a replica of his signature. It occupies a space in the centre of the square facing a plaza paved with matching gray granite slabs accented by planters, trees and a small fountain. The perimeter of the square is bordered by grass and trees.

== The Night Watch ==
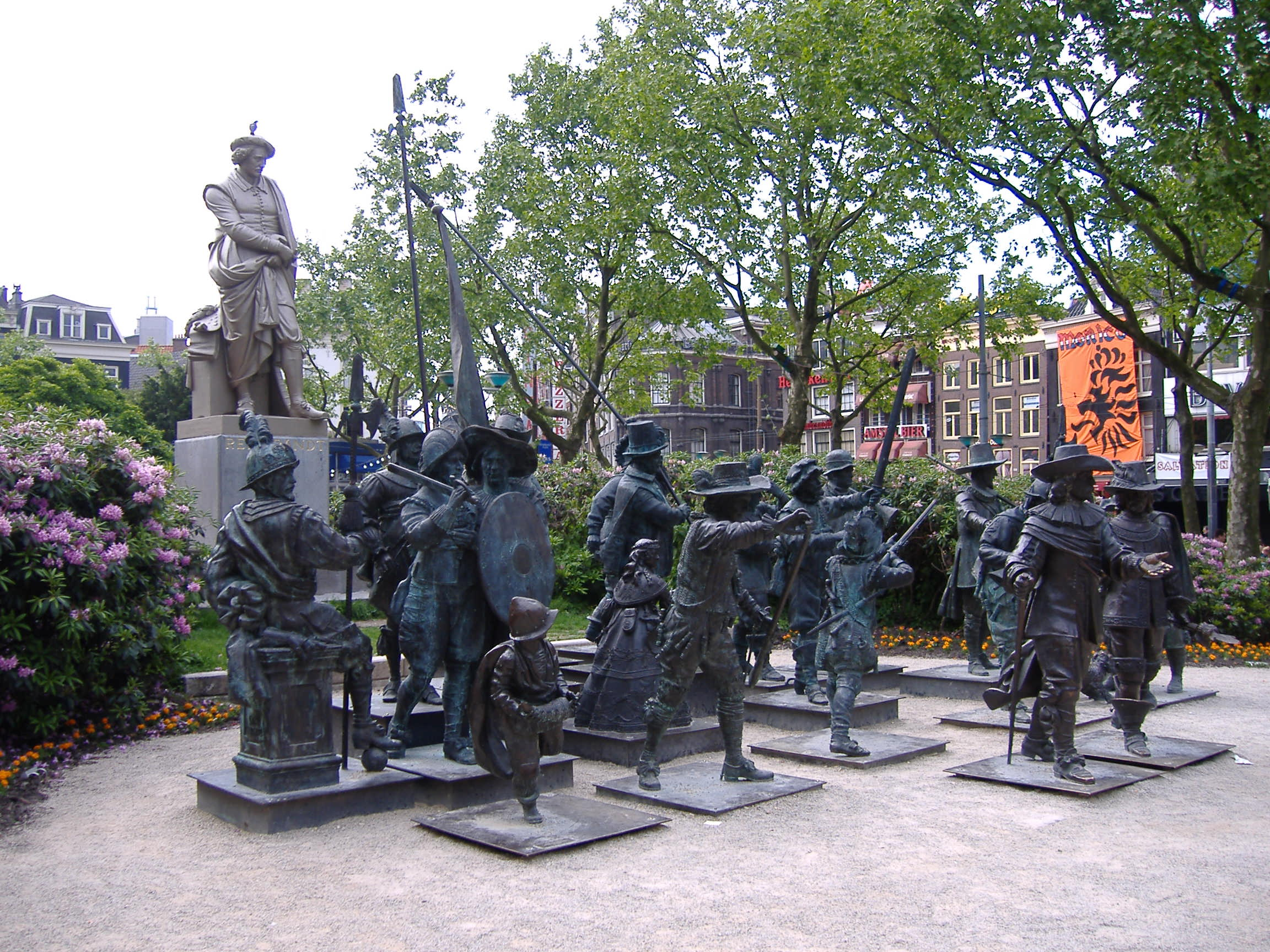
The sculptures of the Night Watch in 3D at the Rembrandtplein in Amsterdam in 2006-2009

As part of the celebration of the artist's 400th birthday in 2006, a bronze-cast representation of his most famous painting, The Night Watch, by Russian artists Mikhail Dronov and Alexander Taratynov was displayed around the Royer work. This bronze-cast representation of the famous painting was on display for three-years before traveling to New York City, Moscow and Oranienbaum, Russia. In 2012, the bronze Night Watch sculptures returned to the redesigned square where they served as a magnet for visitors. In January 2013, the Rembrandtplein Entrepreneurs Foundation began a fundraiser to keep the sculptures in the square throughout the year.

The statues were removed on February 12, 2020. Rembrandtplein business association was unable to reach an agreement with the artists (Mikhail Dronov and Alexander Taratynov) regarding either the rental or purchase of the Night Watch sculptures. The sculptors wanted to sell their creation for 1.5 million euro. Later a price of 1 million euro was mentioned. Reportedly the business association paid 75.000 euro a year in rental fees.
