= Jan Frans van Geel =

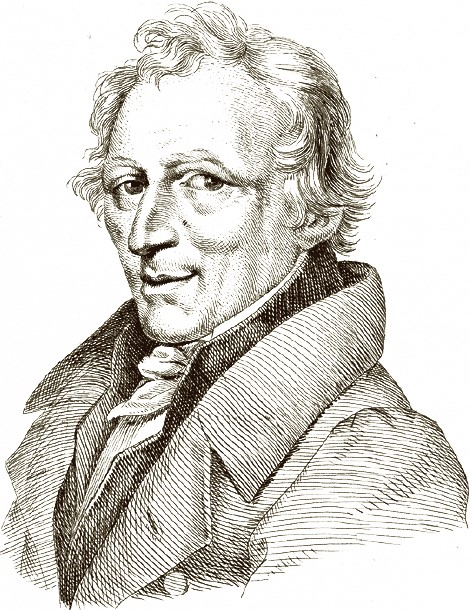
Portrait of Jan Frans van Geel

Jan Frans van Geel (Mechelen, 18 September 1756 – Antwerp, 20 January 1830) was a Flemish sculptor, draughtsman and art educator. He is mainly known for his church furniture, statues of saints, mythological ensembles and allegorical figures. He was a teacher and director at the Academy of Arts of Mechelen and teacher of sculpture at the Academy of Arts of Antwerp. He was one of the last Flemish sculptors who worked in the Flemish Baroque style in sculpture, which was popular in the Habsburg Netherlands in the 17th and 18th centuries.

== Life ==
Van Geel was born in Mechelen on 18 September 1756 and baptized in the Onze-Lieve-Vrouw-over-de-Dijlekerk (Church of Our Lady-across-the-Dyle). His parents Joannes Daniël van Geel and Anna Maria Wabbens were merchants. They allowed him to study art in his home town under Willem Jacob Herreyns. Herreyns was a painter originally from Antwerp who created art in the style of the great Flemish tradition of Baroque painting and had been one of the founders of the academy in Mechelen. As he developed an interest in sculpture, van Geel also started to study under the sculptor Pieter Valckx, a pupil of Theodoor Verhaegen and one of the last Flemish sculptors working in a late Baroque style. He worked in the workshop of Valckx during the day and attended drawing classes at the academy in the evening. He received various distinction from the academy for his works. In 1784, he was offered the position of adjunct teacher at the academy. He also obtained commissions for church furniture such as pulpits and statues of saints.

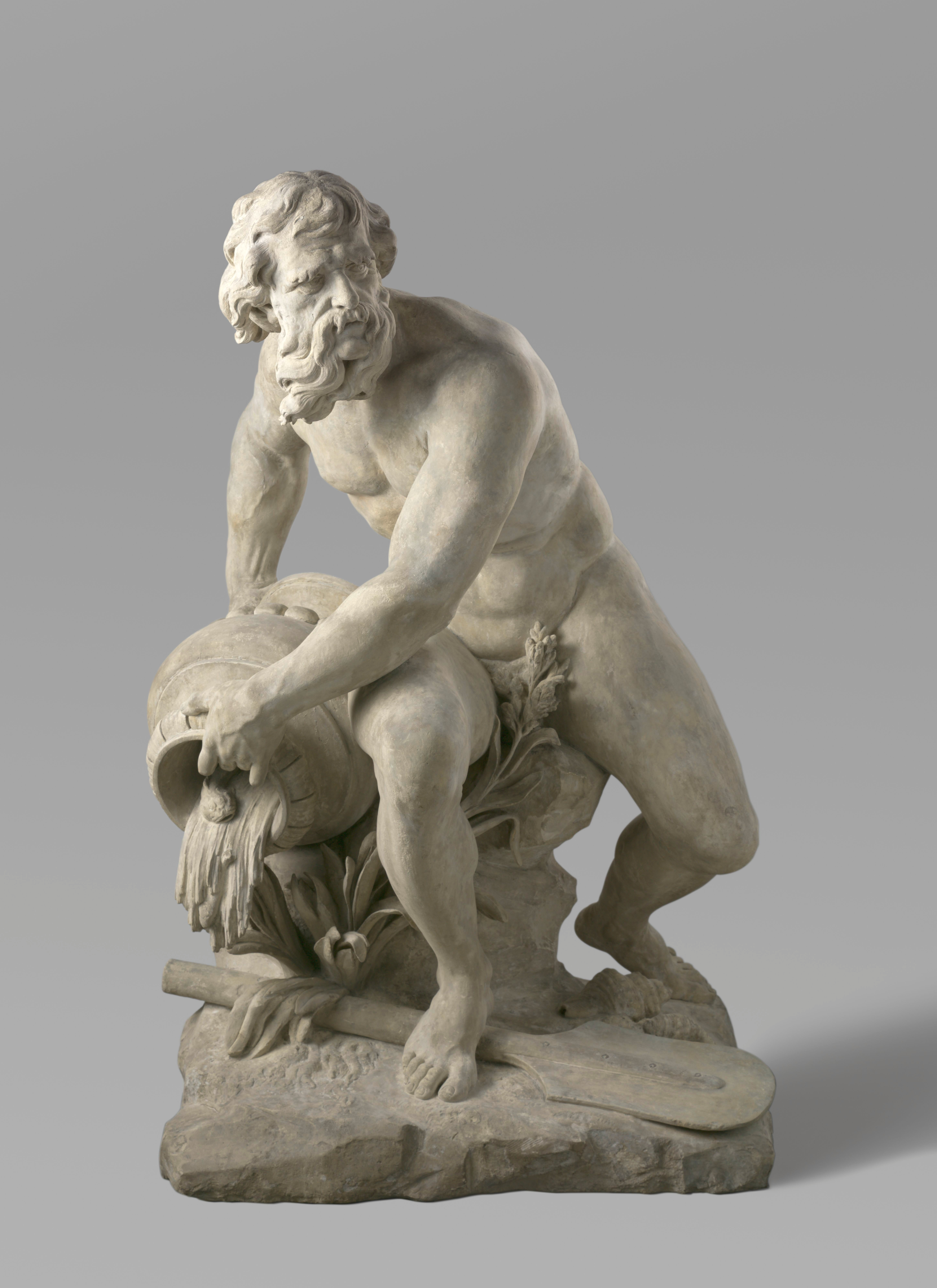
Scaldis

In 1786 he married Joanna Clara Suetens, the aunt of the Mechelen painter Lodewijk Suetens. Their eldest son Jan Lodewijk followed in his father's footsteps and became a celebrated sculptor and court sculptor to King William I of the Netherlands. A second son became a draughtsman and shop owner. A third son Petrus Cornelius became a priest and published botanist who was also an amateur draughtsman and painter. A daughter Maria Catharina married the sculptor and joiner Jan Baptist Judo of Brussels.

After the French Revolution and occupation of the Austrian Netherlands by the French who closed down all churches, he started to create garden statues inspired by his study of Classical sculpture. When Herreyns left Mechelen to become director of the Academy of Antwerp in 1797, van Geel succeeded him as a director of the Academy of Mechelen. In 1807 he was appointed the chief teacher of the academy. He held that position until 1817, when he was appointed by royal decree as teacher of sculpture at the Academy of Antwerp.

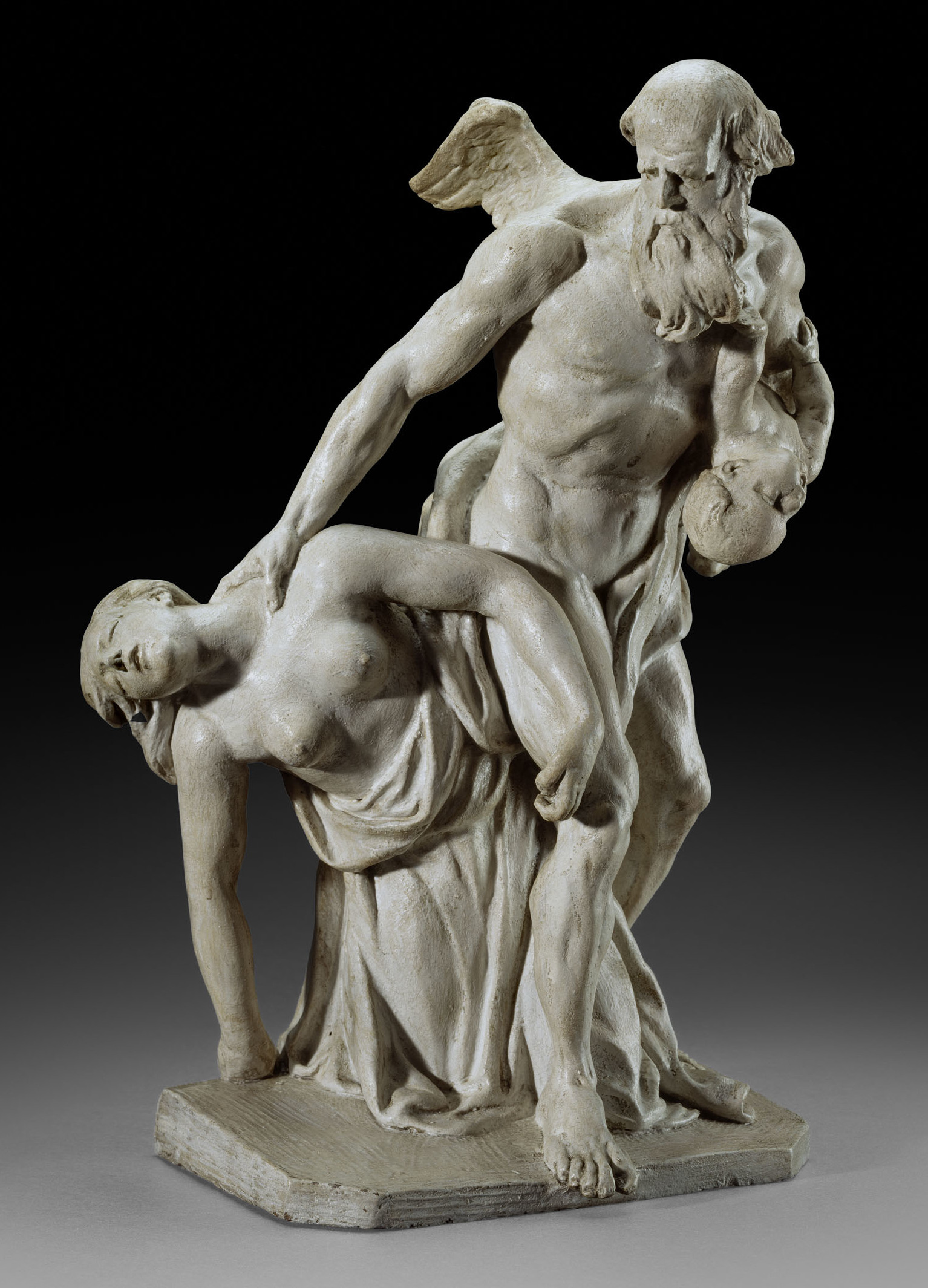
Allegory of Time

Antwerp, at the time a city in the United Kingdom of the Netherlands, was experiencing an economic revival offering van Geel various opportunities to obtain commissions. He was invited to create church furniture for various local churches, including Antwerp Cathedral, St. Andrew's Church and St. James' Church. In addition, he received private commissions for sculptures. He was further honored by an appointment as special sculptor to the Archbishop of Mechelen, Prince Cardinal de Méan.

His many students include, among others, his son Jan Lodewijk, Louis Royer, Joseph Tuerlinckx, Willem Geefs, Willem Geefs, Pieter-Frans De Noter, Joseph Geefs, Jan Antonie van der Ven, Joseph De Bay, Karel Geerts, Jan-Baptist de Cuyper, Jan Frans van Hool, Pieter-Joseph de Cuyper, Frans Vervloet and Willem Stas.

== Work ==
Van Geel was a prolific artist who created large scale church furniture such as pulpits and statues of saints and garden statues, as well as more intimate small-scale works and portrait busts. He worked in various materials, including stone, terracotta and wood. Examples of the latter are the many pulpits he created such as those in the churches in Zemst, Eppegem and Hofstade (Flemish Brabant).

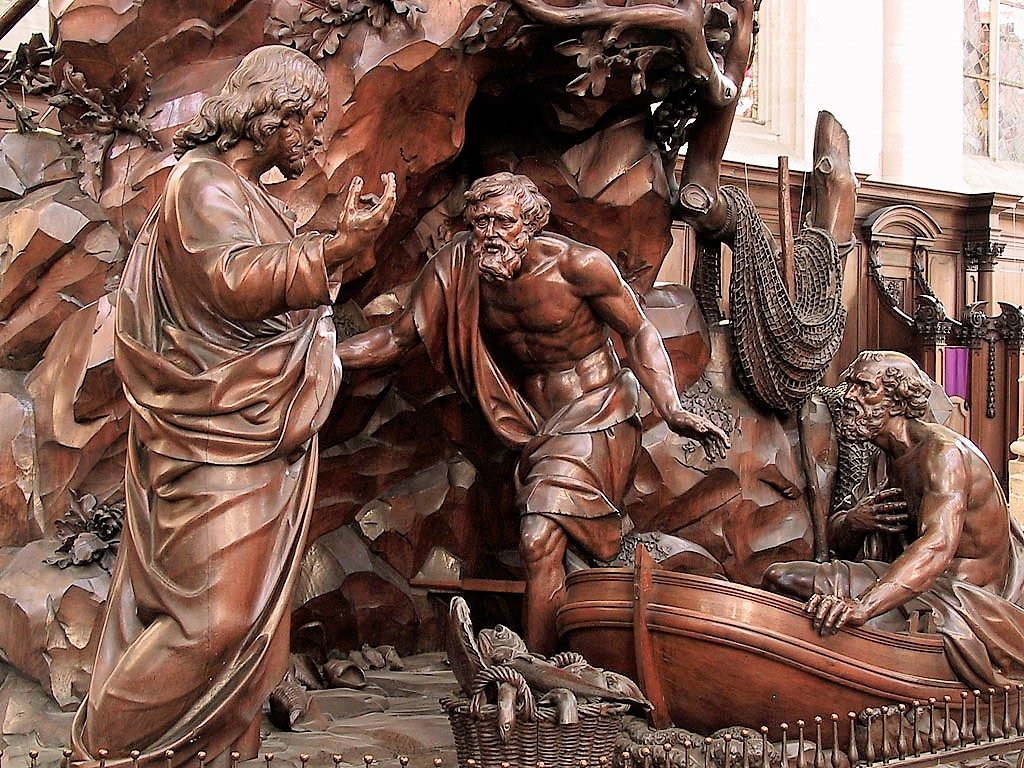
Calling of Peter and Andrew, St. Andrew's Church, Antwerp

He remained attached to the Flemish style of the Baroque period, although his work also shows an awareness of the upcoming neoclassicistic movement. His most important works include the pulpit of the St. Andrew's Church in Antwerp, a series of statues of saints for the St James Church in Antwerp and a series of terracotta bozzetti on religious as well as mythological themes. Some of the sketches and drawings for architectural and sculptural projects made by van Geel are kept in the Plantin-Moretus Museum in Antwerp.

His best known work is the pulpit in oak in the St. Andrew's Church in Antwerp. He created it in the period from 1821 to 1825 in collaboration with the sculptor and cabinetmaker Jan Baptist van Hool. The pulpit is a typical example of the naturalistic pulpits that were popular in the Habsburg Netherlands in the Late High Baroque. Naturalistic pulpits were conceived as a single large sculpture in which the different elements of the pulpit (the support, the stairs, the tub and the sounding board) have been integrated and made subordinate to the overall concept of the biblical story represented. The pulpit in the St. Andrew's Church depicts the calling of the first two apostles, the brothers Peter and Andrew. Andrew is also the patron saint of the church. The story is represented by Christ and the two brothers in life-size statutes which are tangible, as are all the props of the story: the fishing boat of the future apostles, the oars, the safety net and their catch. The figures, their equipment and their catch are stunningly realistic amidst a naturalistic stage setting of rocks and plants.

== Principal works ==
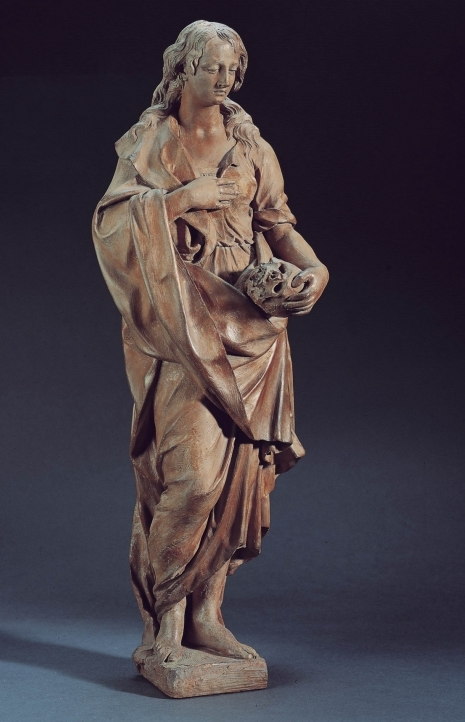
Mary Magdalen

- Statues of the apostles James the Great, Andrew and Thomas in the Church of Our Lady-across-the-Dyle (in stone).
- Two statues of Seraphs on the altar of Our Lady of the Seven Woes in the Church of Our Lady-across-the-Dyle (in wood).
- A statue of Mary Magdalene, with two allegorical statues, crowning the portal of the Saint Rombold Cathedral in Mechelen.
- Allegory of Time, large statue in wood; collection of Museum Hof van Busleyden, Mecheen.
- Allegory of Religion; current location unknown.
- The Holy Trinity, high altar in the Cathedral of Our Lady in Antwerp.
- Statue of St. Joseph in the wedding chapel of the Cathedral of Our Lady in Antwerp.
- Angels bearing the image of Joannes Moretus and supporting the portrait of Christophe Plantin in the Cathedral of Our Lady in Antwerp.
- Saint Jerome and Saint Ambrose, executed in 1824 in white stone, the St. James' Church in Antwerp.
- The pulpit in the Saint Clement church of Eppegem.
- The pulpit of the Saint Peter's church of Zemst.
- Two confessionals in the church of Our Lady in Onze-Lieve-Vrouw-Waver.
- The Three Divine Virtues: Faith, Hope and Love, in the Saint Amandus church in Geel.
- The pulpit in the Church of Our Lady of the Assumption in Hofstade (Flemish Brabant), Aalst.

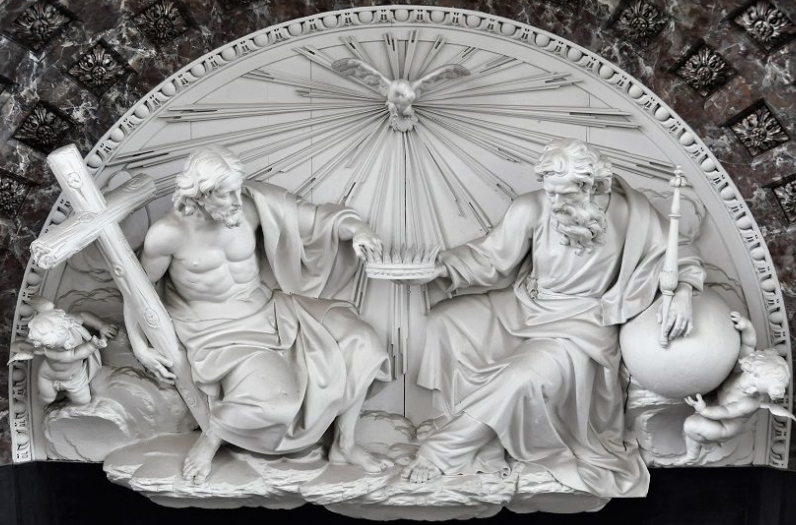
The Holy Trinity

- Medallion, bust in marble, on the memorial stone of Andreas-Cornelius Lens; in the gallery of the Academy of Antwerp.
- Statues of Saint Peter and Saint Paul, in the Church of Our-Lady-in Merchtem.
- A statue of Saint Ludovicus, in the Saint Louis Church in Leiden, the Netherlands.
- Statues of Faith, Hope and Charity, on the high altar in the Saint Martin Church in Asse.
- Sculpture group of Minerva giving life to the statue of love by Pygmalion, 1809, current location unknown.
- Bust in plaster of Mr. Pycke, governor of the province of Antwerp; Royal Academy of Antwerp,. 1819.
- Sculpture group of Prometheus, current location unknown.
- De Eendracht (Unity), stone statue in the town hall of Mechelen, 1803.
