= Beveren (disambiguation) =

Beveren is a municipality located in the Belgian province of East Flanders.

Beveren may also refer to:

- Beveren (Alveringhem)
- Beveren (rabbit), one of the oldest and largest breeds of fur rabbits
- K.S.K. Beveren, Belgian football club

== See also ==
- Van Beveren, a surname
