= Pieter Valckx =

Flemish sculptor

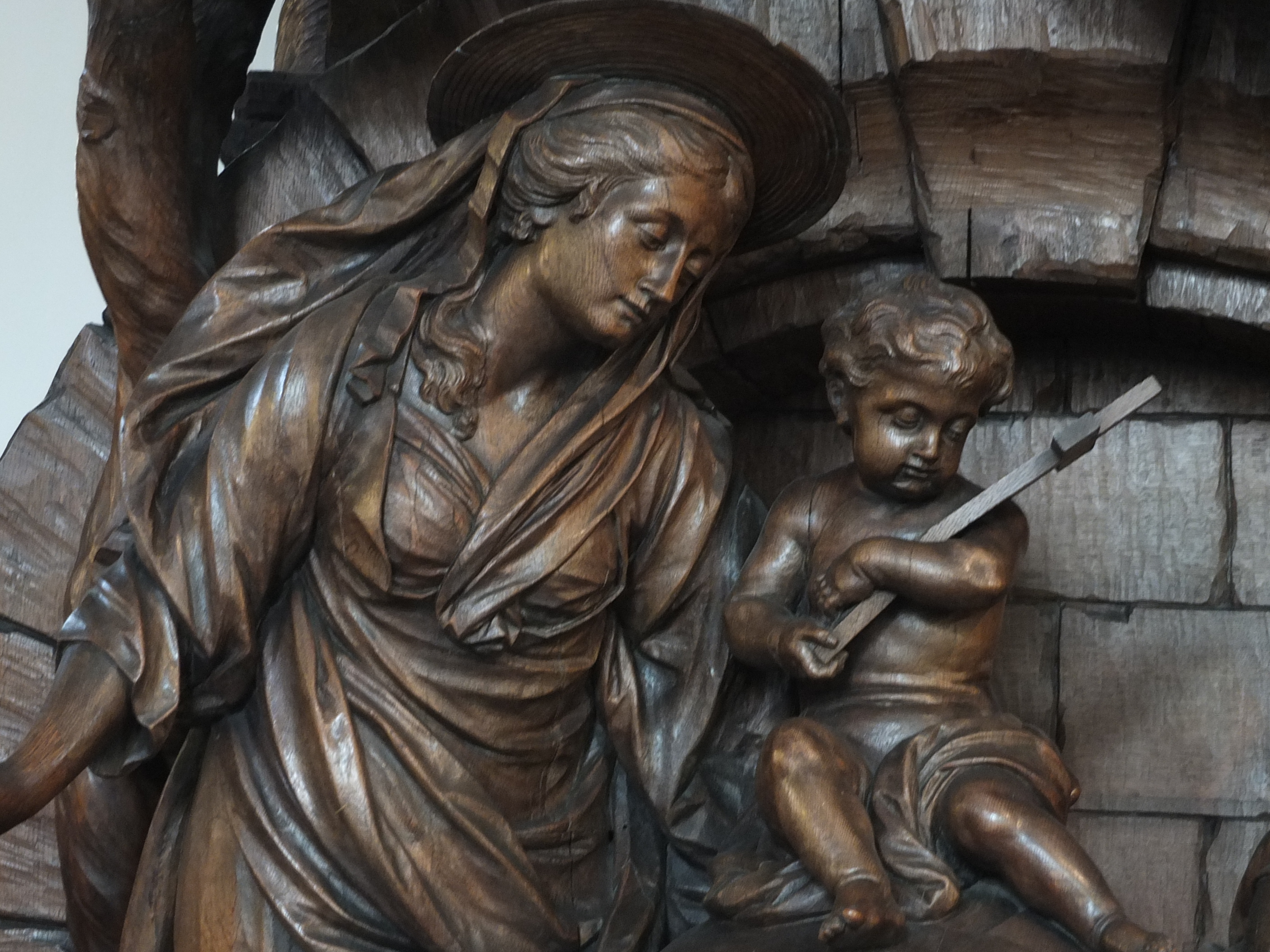
Confessional depicting the Holy Family taking shelter in the temple ruins, St Catherine's Church, Mechelen

Pieter Valckx (1 March 1734, Mechelen – 3 May 1785, Mechelen) was a Flemish sculptor. He is mainly known for church furniture in the churches in Mechelen. He was one of the last representatives of the Flemish Baroque.

== Life ==
Valckx was the son of a painter and trained in Mechelen with the sculptors Theodoor Verhaegen and Jan Baptist Mooriaen. He then continued his studies at the Academy of Fine Arts in Antwerp. He also attended classes in the studio of Alexander Franciscus Schobbens. On his return to Mechelen in 1761 he became a master sculptor. In 1780 he became dean of the Guild of Saint Luke of Mechelen.

His pupils included Jan Frans van Geel, who had a brilliant career, en Jan Baptist Turner.

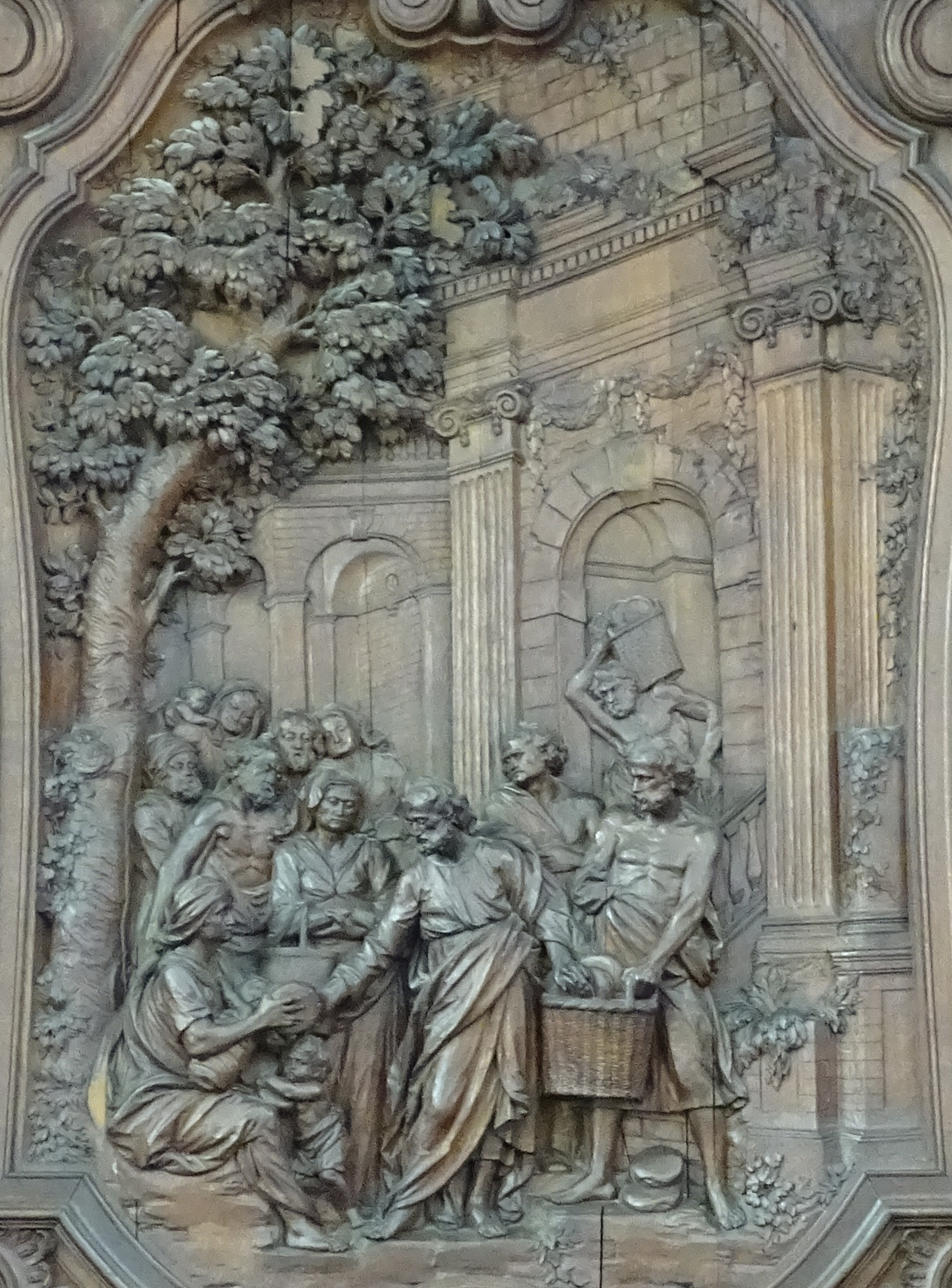
Organ case depicting the Multiplication of the loaves, Church of St John the Baptist and Evangelist, Mechelen

== Work ==
The majority of Valckx's works consists of church furniture, which shows the influence of his teacher Theodoor Verhaegen in its naturalistic detail as well as of the school of Peter Paul Rubens.

He produced many pieces of church furnishings after designs by Verhaegen, such as the main altar (1768) in the Church of St John the Baptist and Evangelist in Mechelen and the pulpit (1774) of the St. Catherine Church in Mechelen.

== Selected works ==
=== Mechelen ===
- St. Rumbold's Cathedral: Statue of St. Mark and medallions of St. Augustine and St. Norbert (1750), which were originally placed in the Church of Our Lady of Leliendaal, Mechelen.
- St. Catherine Church: The pulpit (1774), which shows Verhaegen's influence.
- Church of St John the Baptist and Evangelist: The panels carved in relief (1784) of the choir stalls, the organ case (designed by Verhaegen) and the stalls in the western tower are regarded as his finest work, displaying a feeling for naturalistic detail in the tradition of his teacher Verhaegen. In the period 1768-1769 Pieter Valckx incorporated the triptych of the Adoration of the Magi painted by Peter Paul Rubens in 1617 into the new main altar. Valckx further executed the altar in the sacrament chapel designed by the painter Willem Jacob Herreyns.
- Our Lady of the Dijle Church: the pulpit and a statue of the Apostle Philip.
- Floats: Pieter Valckx and Willem Jacob Herreyns were commissioned by the Jesuits in Mechelen to design a series of floats on the occasion of the celebrations for the thousandth anniversary of the city's patron saint Rumbold of Mechelen in 1775. They designed the floats together and also designed the triumphal arches. It is not clear whether the floats were effectively used in the celebrations as the Jesuit order was dissolved in 1773 and the event was then organized by the rival order of the Oratorians.

=== Outside Mechelen ===
- St. Peter's Church in Meerbeke: The pulpit, representing a Nativity Scene (1773)
- St. Amand's Church in Geel: The confessionals
- St. Gertrude Church in Ternat: The Baroque pulpit is a work of Pieter Valckx’ workshop (1779)
- St. Germanus Church in Tienen: The pulpit (1760)
- St. Catherine Church in Brussels: The pulpit (originally in the St. Rumbold's Cathedral in Mechelen)
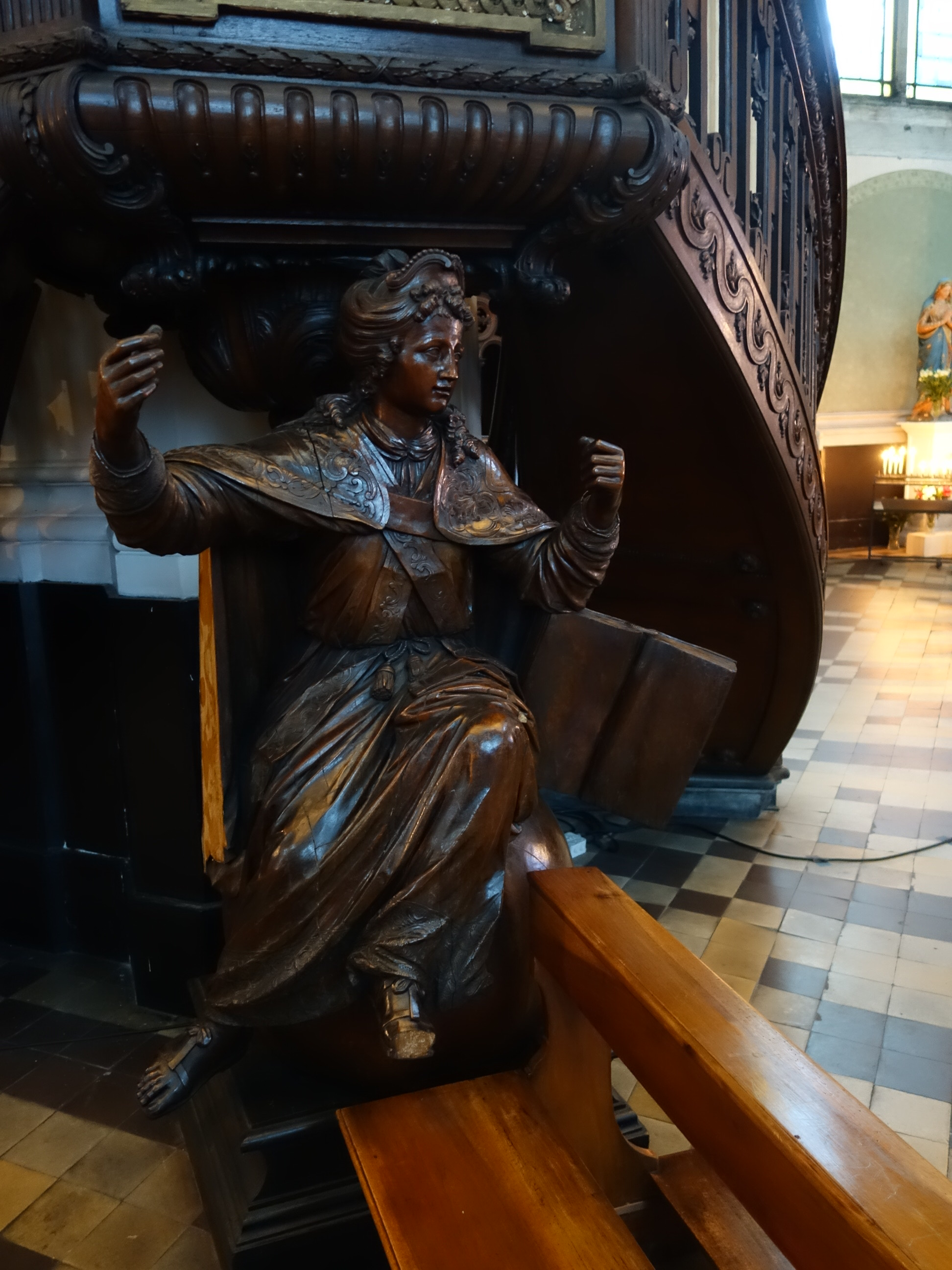
Brussels

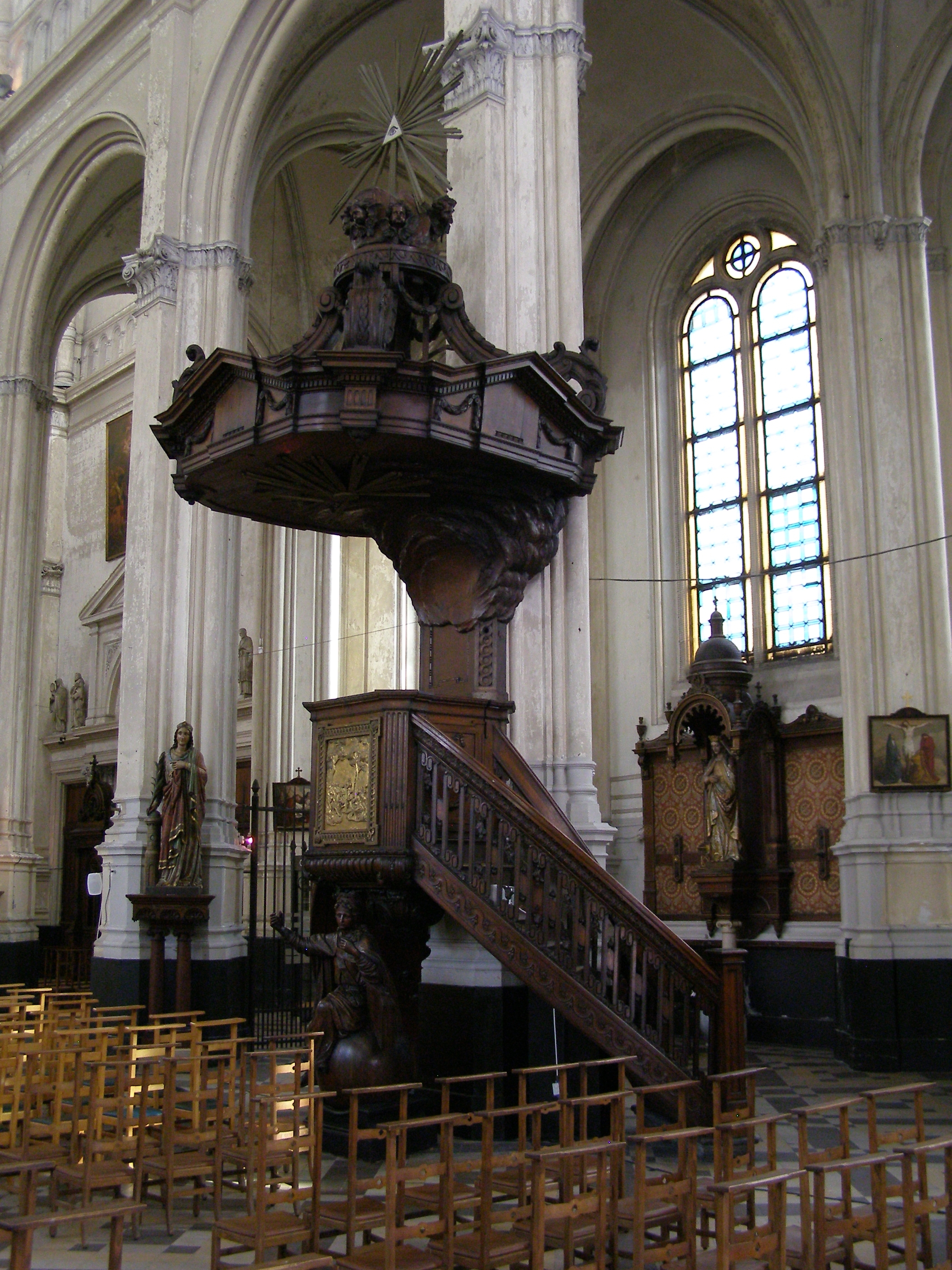
Brussels

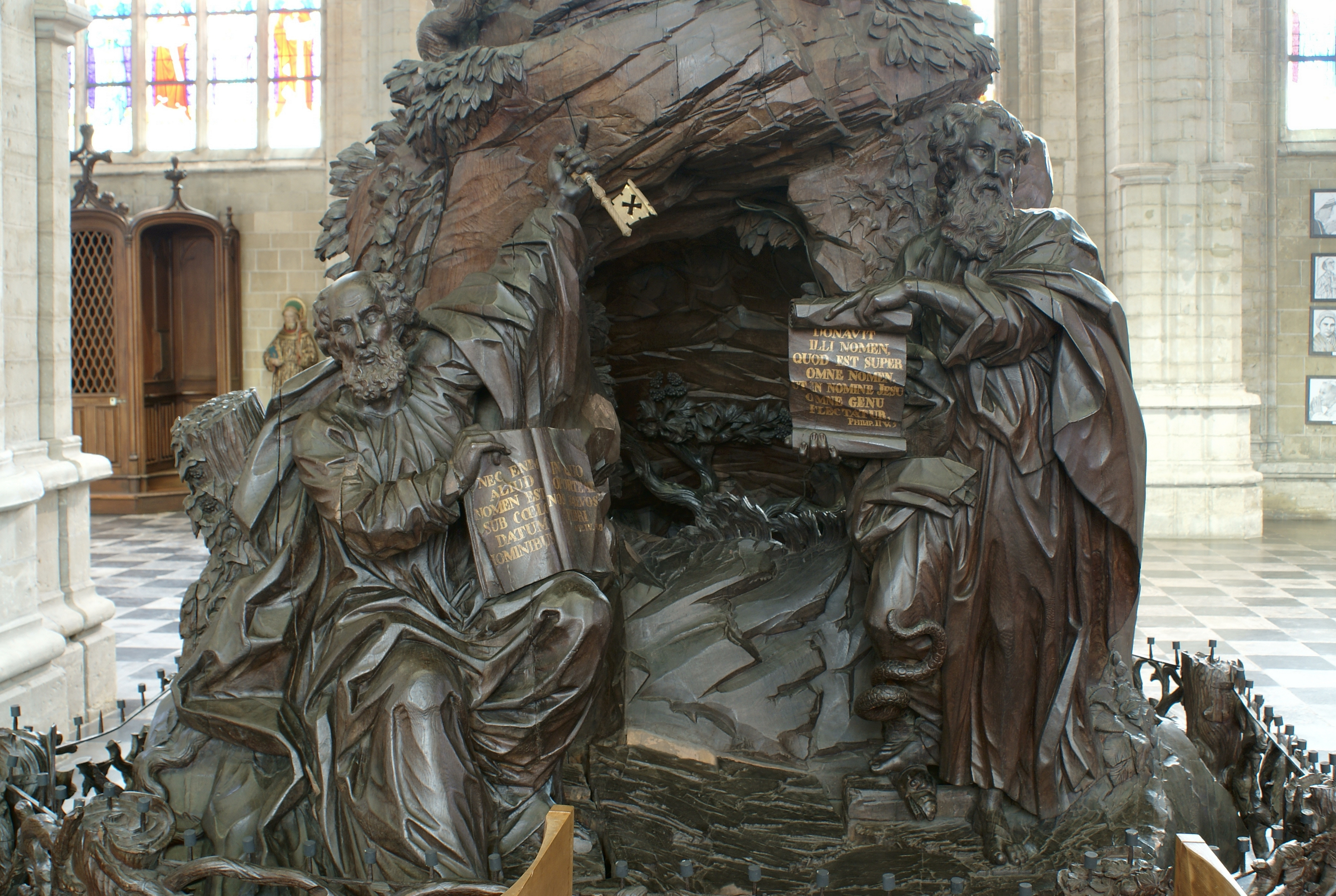
Tienen

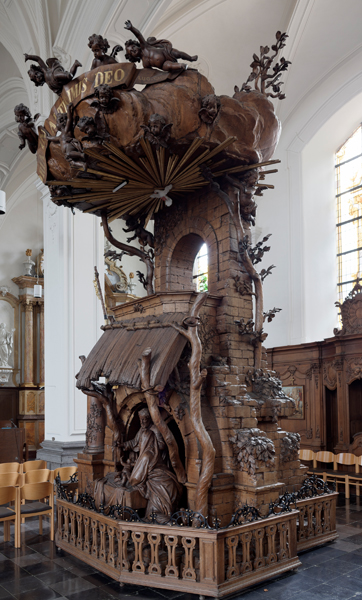
Meerbeke

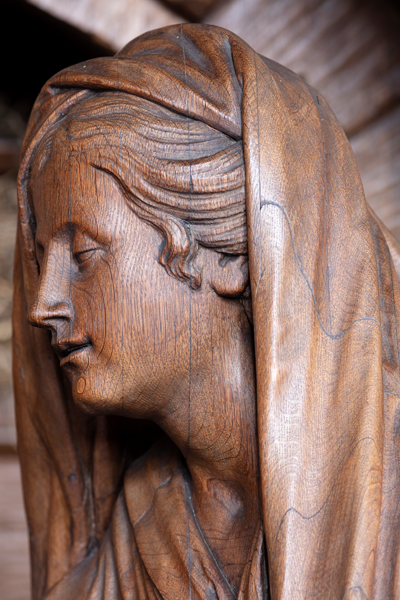
Meerbeke
