= Charles Van Beveren =

Belgian artist

Charles van Beveren
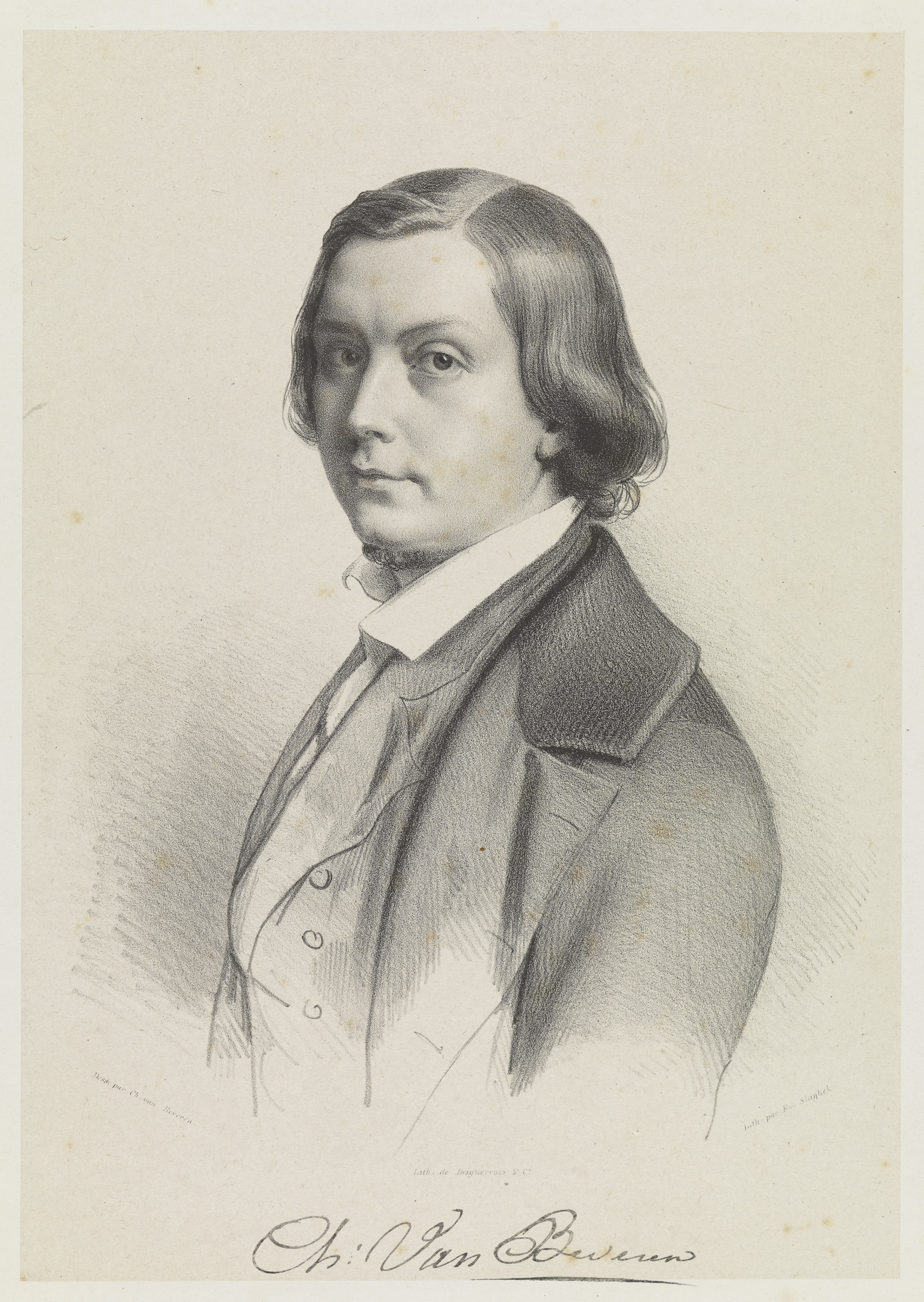
- Self portrait
- Born: Charles van Beveren; 6 April 1809; Mechelen
- Died: 16 September 1850 (aged 41); Amsterdam
- Education: Koninklijke Academie voor Beeldende Kunsten van Mechelen; Academie voor Schone Kunsten van Antwerpen
- Occupation: Member of Royal Institute of the Netherlands

Charles van Beveren (1809–1850), was a painter of Belgian origin. He produced portraits, history paintings, and genre pieces in a romantic style.

== Biography ==
He was born on 6 April 1809 in Mechelen. His father, Joseph van Beveren, who intended him for a commercial career, was soon compelled to yield to his son’s irresistible passion for the visual arts.

As a student at the Academie voor Beeldende Kunsten van Mechelen and at the Academie voor Schone Kunsten van Antwerpen, the young van Beveren immediately distinguished himself among his peers.

By 1826, he developed his talent to such an extent that at the competition held that year in Antwerp, he not only received the greatest number of laurels but also earned the special favour of the highly esteemed Baron de Pret. For the Baron, he travelled to Holland to produce a copy for Douw’s evening school and settled in Amsterdam in 1830.

Due to an illness, he travelled to Italy in 1832. He made his stay there productive by studying the renowned works of the sixteenth and seventeenth centuries. In 1834, having once again visited Italy and subsequently Paris, he returned to his homeland imbued with the beauties of the Italian and French schools, and demonstrated through a series of masterpieces he produced shortly thereafter the extent to which his taste had been refined and his entire aesthetic sensibility developed.

This distinguished artist has been a member of the Royal Academy of Fine Arts in Amsterdam since 1837. At The Hague exhibition of 1835, his Praying Nun was displayed, and at the 1839 exhibition in the same city, the Harpsichord Player was shown.

After 1840, a transformation became evident in him, both in his choice of subjects and in his brushwork; he moved from genre painting to the historical field, and his detailed technique gave way to broader and bolder strokes, with which he executed his Judith and Hagar.

He was already an established artist at the time. Indeed, his biography and portrait can be found in the book by J. Immerzeel Lives and Works of Artists published in 1842.

Having experienced many vicissitudes of various kinds, he married Miss Slaghek in 1849 and settled in his native city. His final major historical work, The Death of St Anthony, dates from this period.

In 1850, Van Beveren was elected a correspondent, living in the Netherlands, of the Royal Institute of the Netherlands, predecessor of the Royal Netherlands Academy of Arts and Sciences.. In that same year, he completed his masterpiece "The duet", he then died in Amsterdam on 16 September 1850.

== Contribution ==
Charles van Beveren was the greatest colourist produced by the Netherlands in the nineteenth century. Although he knew how to appreciate the achievements of his distinguished predecessors, nature remained his preferred model. His devotion to it frequently attracted criticism, with some claiming that he was enslaved by it and unable to free himself from its imperfections. Yet a glance at works such as The Praying Nun, The Harpsichord Player, and The Monk—paintings distinguished by nobility of expression, delicacy of feeling, and a refined beauty of colour and design—is enough to show that van Beveren was never content merely to imitate flawed nature, but aspired instead to the higher calling of art.

Living a withdrawn life and possessing little inclination for society, van Beveren was personally known and appreciated by few. A resolute opponent of superficiality, he was understood by even fewer. Nevertheless, he could not escape the envy of certain fellow artists, who found it in their interest to disparage his abilities. His natural gentleness, which sometimes gave the impression of a lack of vigour, prevented him from rising above continual opposition and fostered a melancholy that frequently reveals itself in his work.

Charles van Beveren received little critical recognition during his lifetime; his work has since drawn greater attention by art historians and critics.

== Works ==
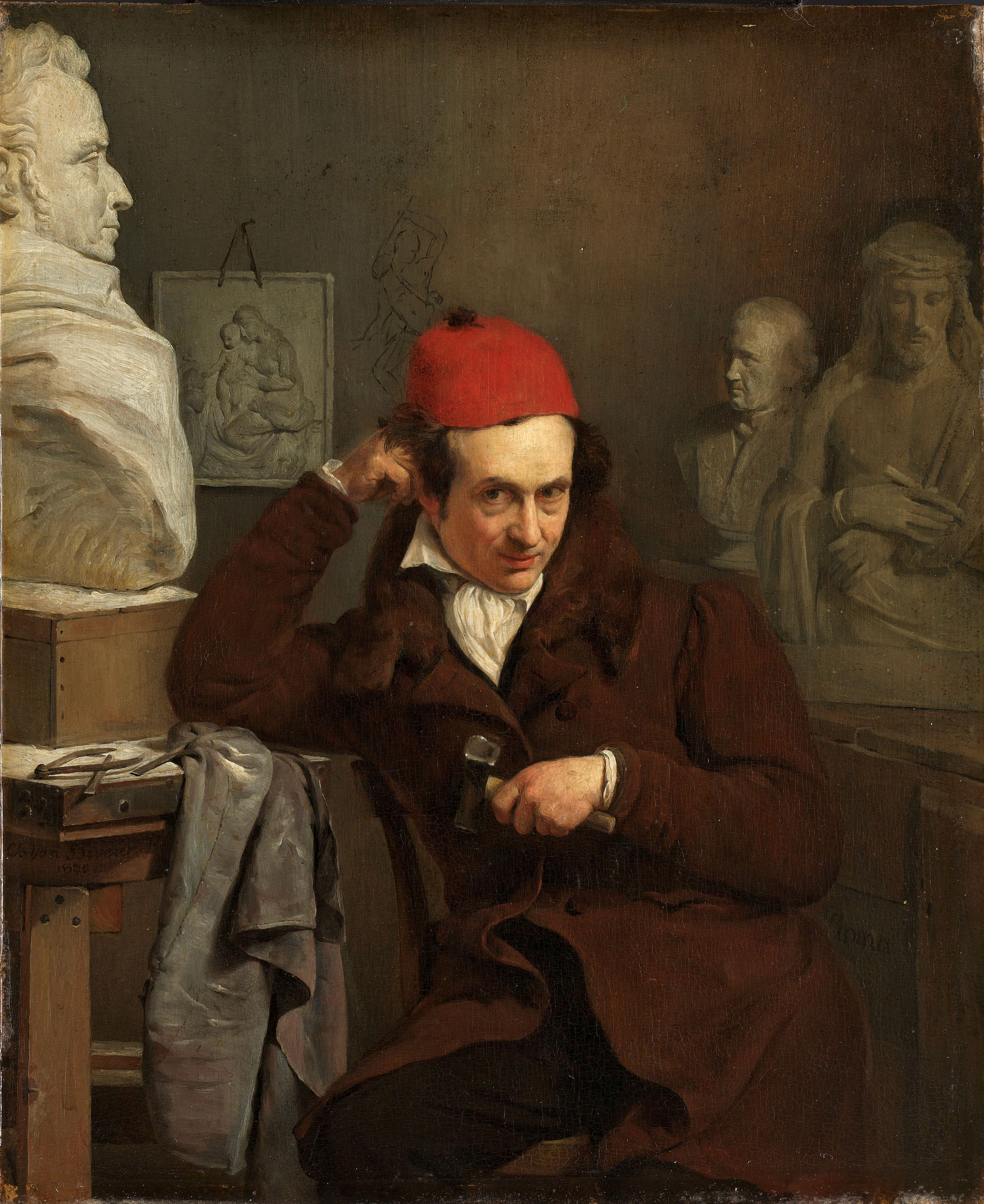
Portrait of the sculptor Louis Royer, 1830

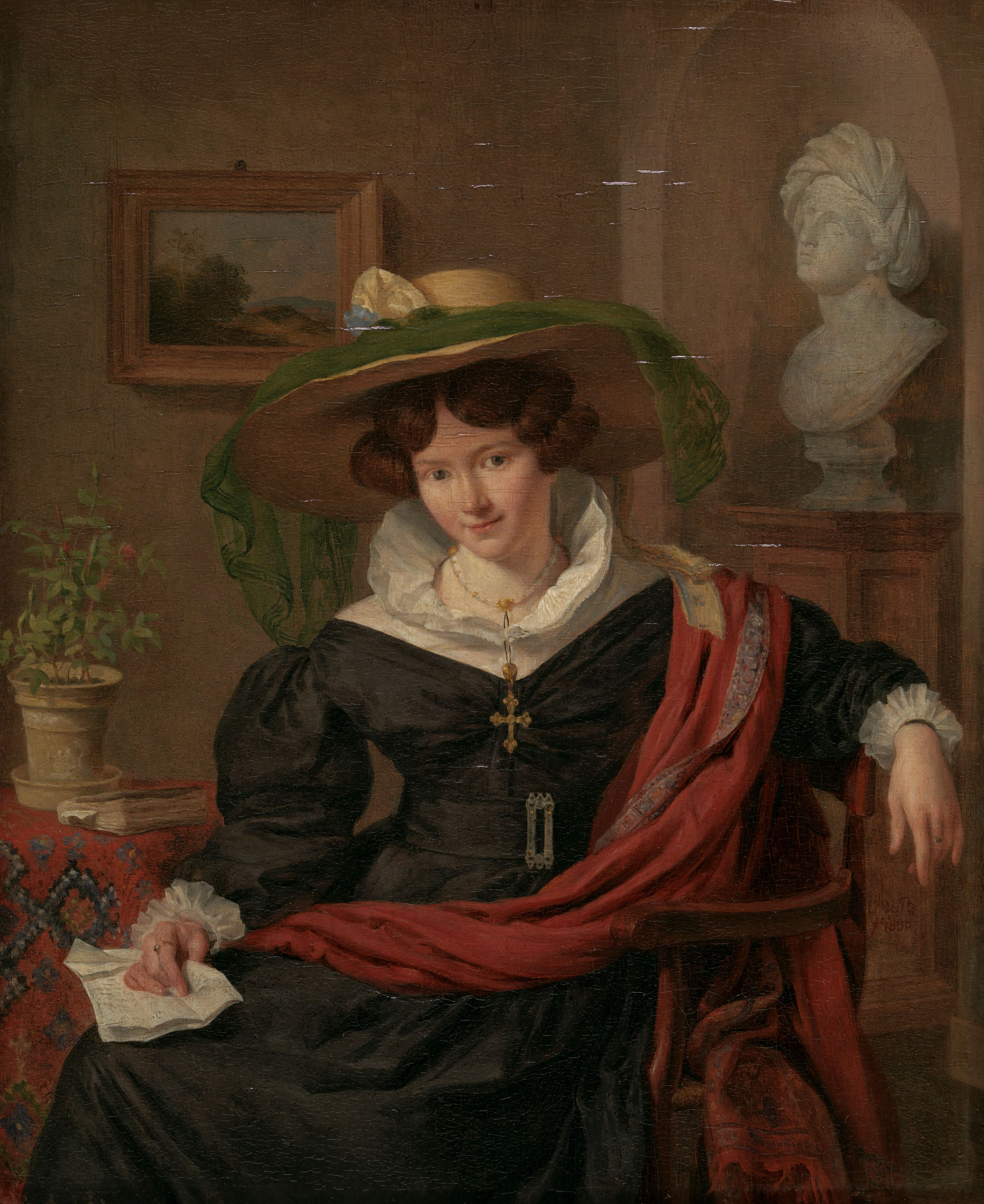
Carolina Frederic Kerst, wife of Louis Royer, pendant

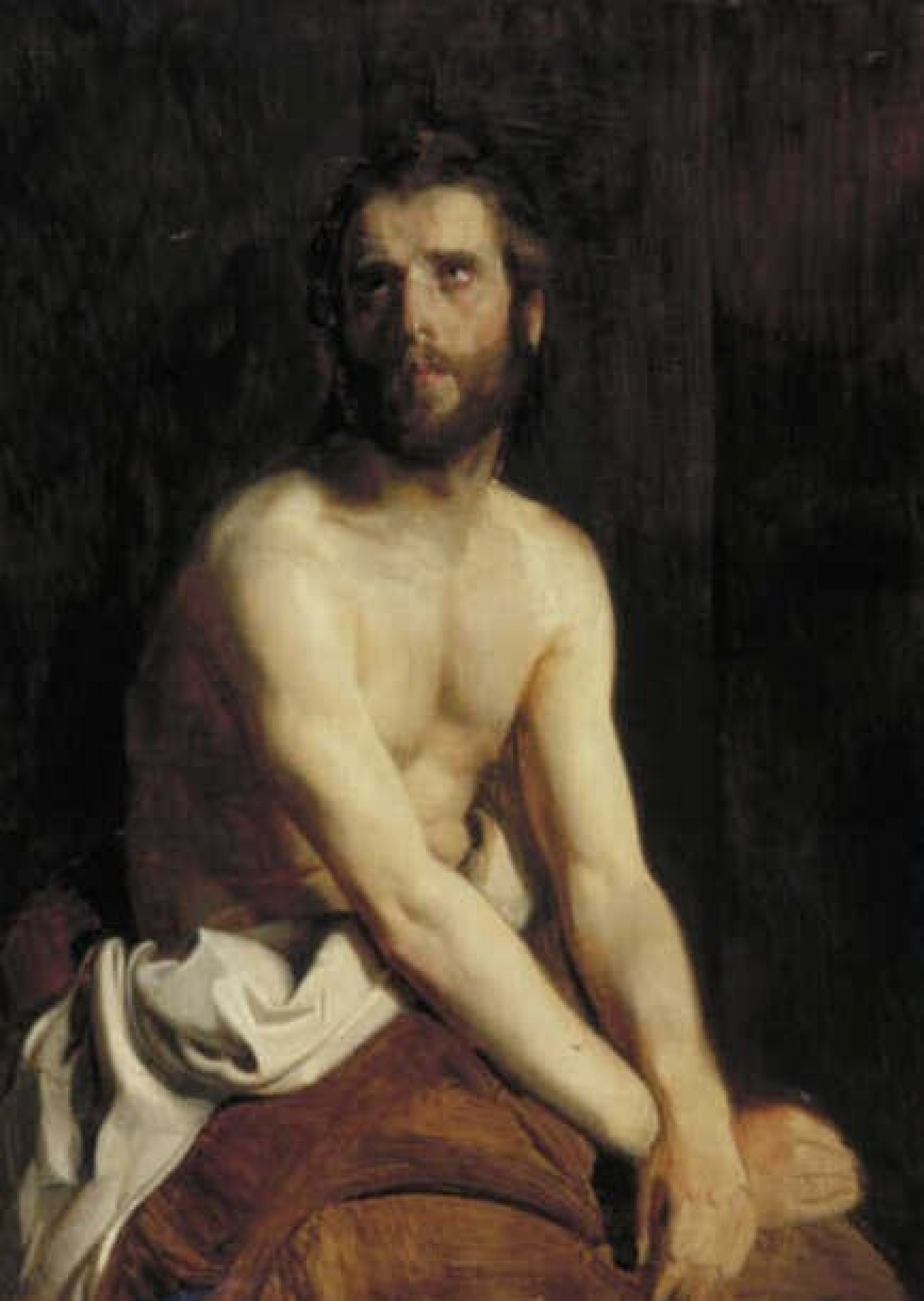
Ecce Homo

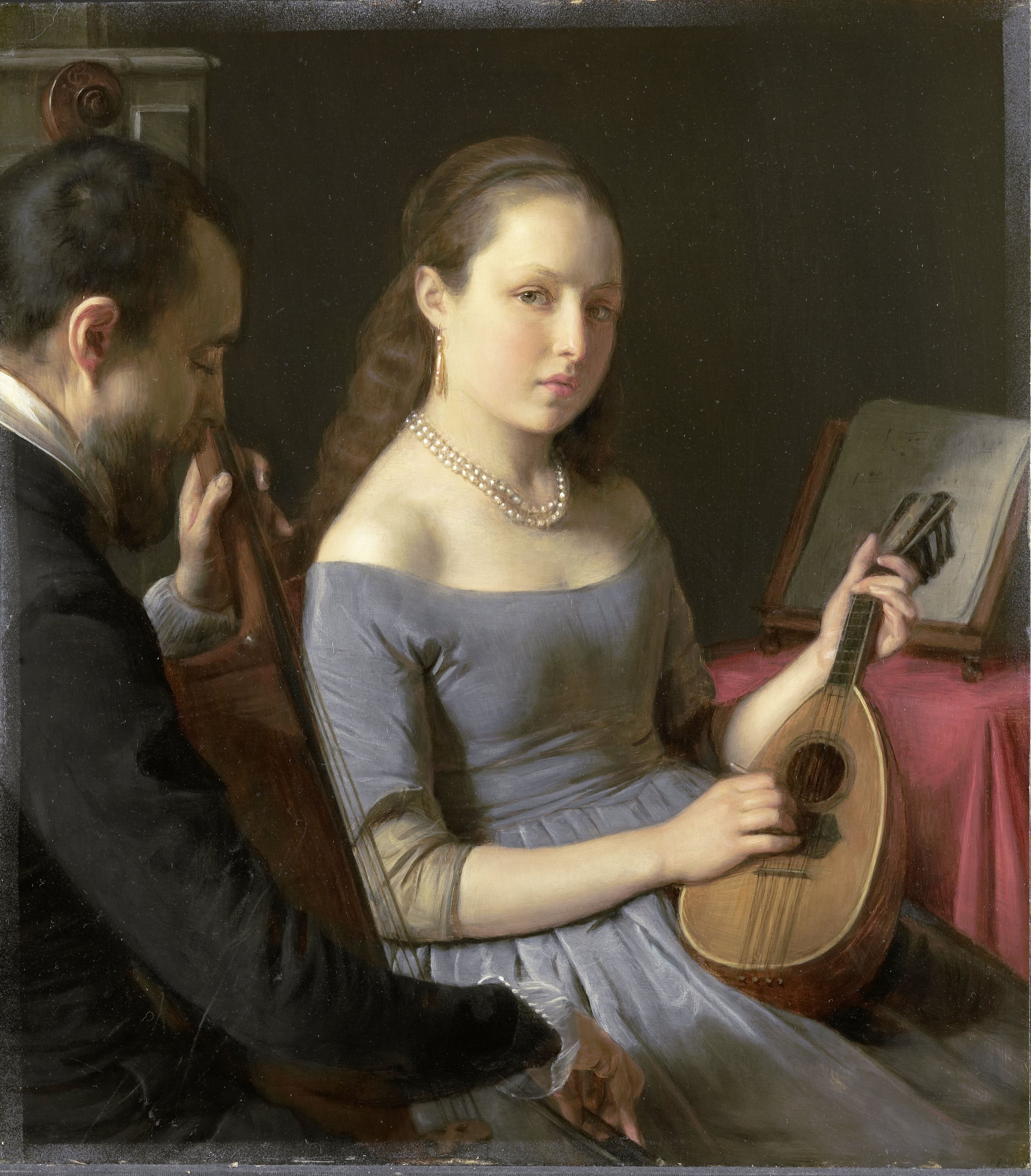
The duet

His best known of his works are:

- Louis Royer and his wife, pendant marriage portraits now in Rijksmuseum Amsterdam.
- The Confession of a Sick Girl (in the Pinakothek at Munich).
- Male Figure. A study (in the Rotterdam Museum).
- The Vision of St. Ignatius.
- The Death of St. Anthony of Padua (in the church of Moses and Aaron at Amsterdam, his chef-d'oeuvre).
