= Joseph Tuerlinckx =

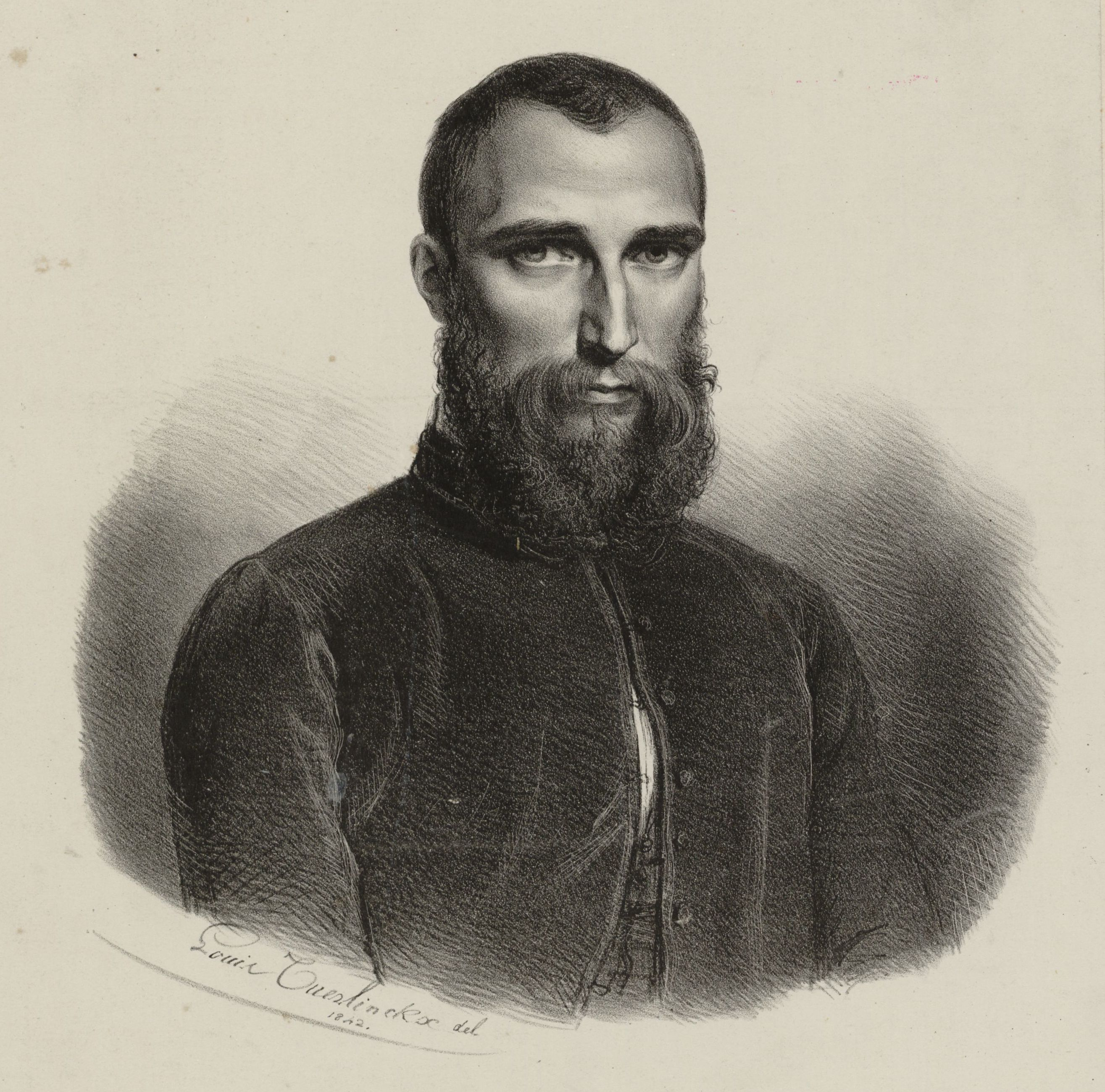
Portrait of Tuerlinckx

Jozef Tuerlinckx (Mechelen, 2 November 1809 – Mechelen, 6 February 1873), also known as Joseph Tuerlinckx or Jozef Jan Tuerlinckx, was a Flemish sculptor and art educator. After training in his native Mechelen, he continued his studies in The Hague, Paris, and Rome. He was one of the leading sculptors in Mechelen, where he was employed on many public commissions. He is mainly known for his historical portraits and funeral monuments. He also was a teacher at the local academy.

== Life ==
Tuerlinckx was born in Mechelen as the son of Antoon (also known as Joannes Arnoldus Anthonius) and his father's second wife Maria Catharina Clavers. His father, originally from Aarschot, had established in Mechelen one of the leading workshops for the production of wood and brass wind instruments in the Southern Netherlands and the Netherlands. He was the half-brother of the composer Corneille Jean Joseph Tuerlinckx and the brother of the painter, lithographer, draughtsman and portraitist Louis Tuerlinckx. At the time of his birth, the Southern Netherlands were under French occupation.

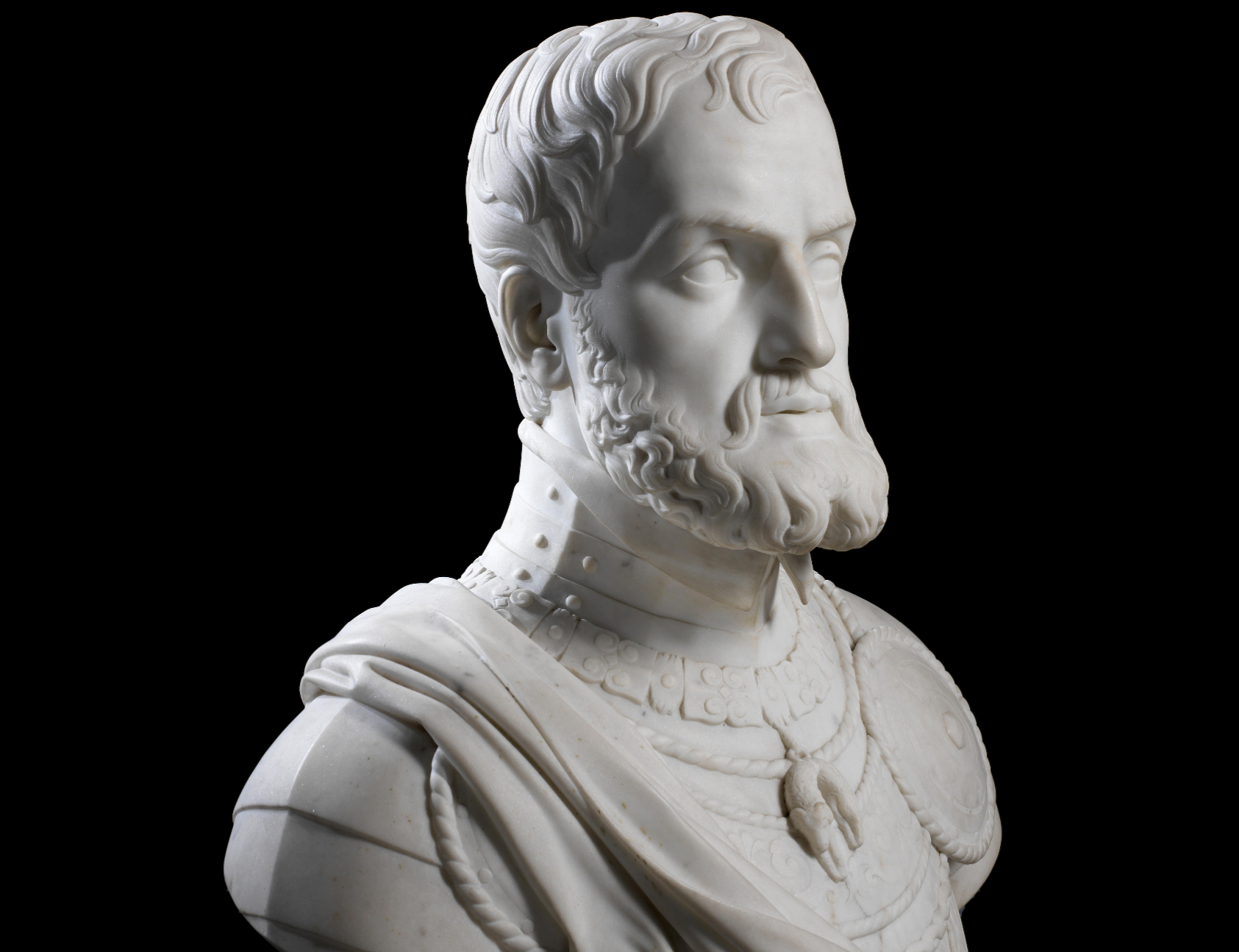
The Holy Roman Emperor Charles V

Joseph Tuerlinckx started drawing classes at an early age. He then studied sculpture under the guidance of the Mechelen sculptor Pieter Jan Tambuyser (1796–1859). Between 1824 and 1827 he worked in the workshop of his teacher. Then he continued his training at the Academy of Antwerp under his fellow townsman Jan Frans van Geel, who had moved to Antwerp. In 1830 he went to The Hague to study under Louis Royer, another sculptor from Mechelen who had become a very successful artist in the Netherlands. After spending four years with Royer, he returned to Mechelen. In 1836 he left for Paris where he struck up a friendship with Jean Baptiste Joseph De Bay père, a sculptor originally from Mechelen who had become the conservator of Antique sculptures at the Louvre. He used his time in Paris to study the many sculptures in the city. From his residence in Paris dates a statue of Ecce Homo (Museum Hof van Busleyden, Mechelen).

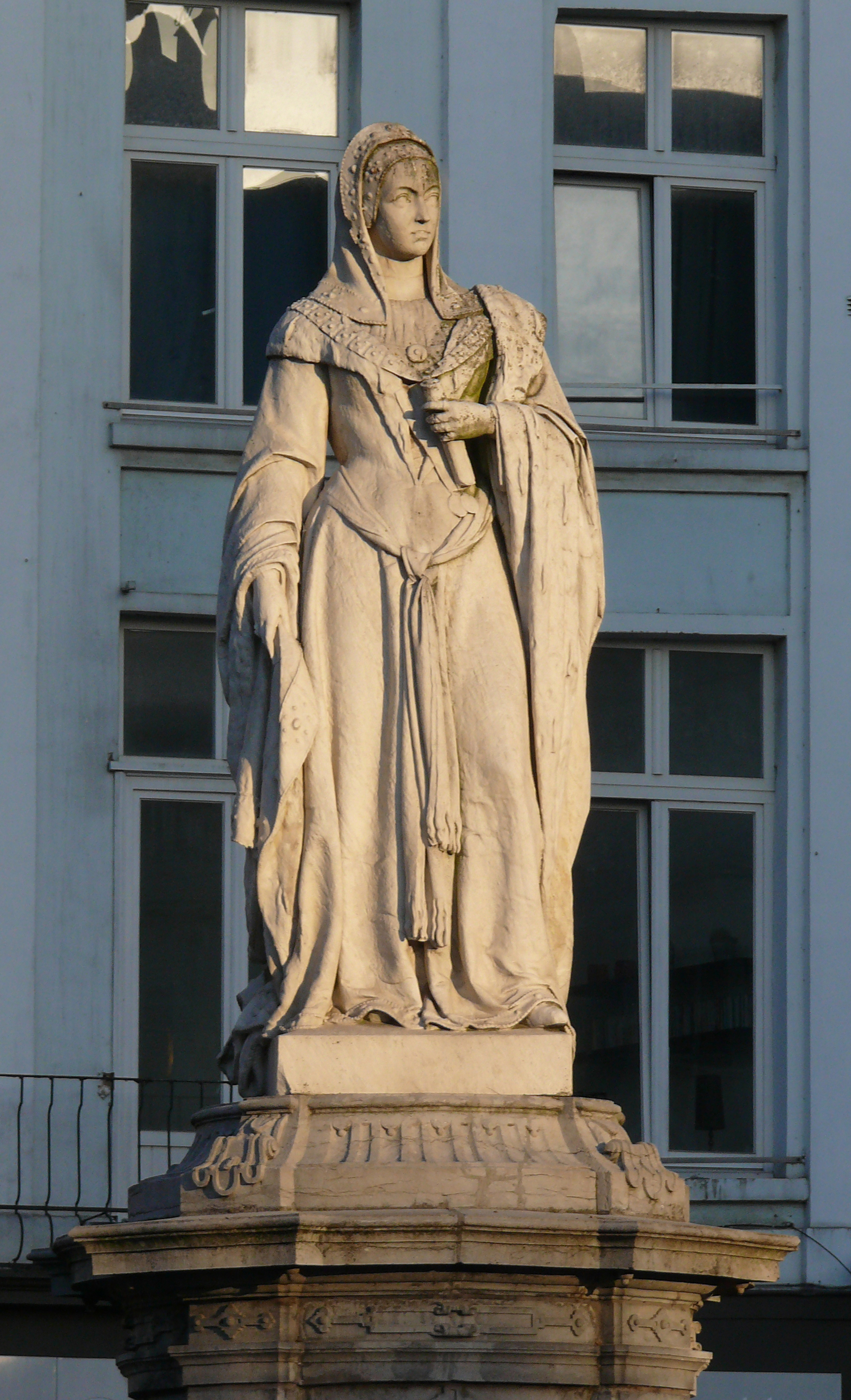
Statue of Margaret of Austria

After returning to Mechelen for some time, he left in 1840 for Italy to further his studies. Here he was joined by his younger brother Louis. He also met with other northern artists in Rome such as the Flemish painter Jean-François Portaels and the Luxembourg sculptor Jacobi Sturm. For his bust of Pope Gregory XVI in white marble which he produced in Rome he was rewarded by the pope with a golden honorary metal. In Rome, he also completed a marble statue of the Virgin (Royal Museums of Fine Arts of Belgium, Brussels and started on the marble busts of Lucas Faydherbe and Godfrey of Bouillon. He completed both on his return to Mechelen. His marble statue of the Italian Renaissance painter Giotto as a 10-year-old boy (Museum Hof van Busleyden, Mechelen) was also produced during his Rome period and later received an honorable mention at the World Exhibition in Paris in 1855.

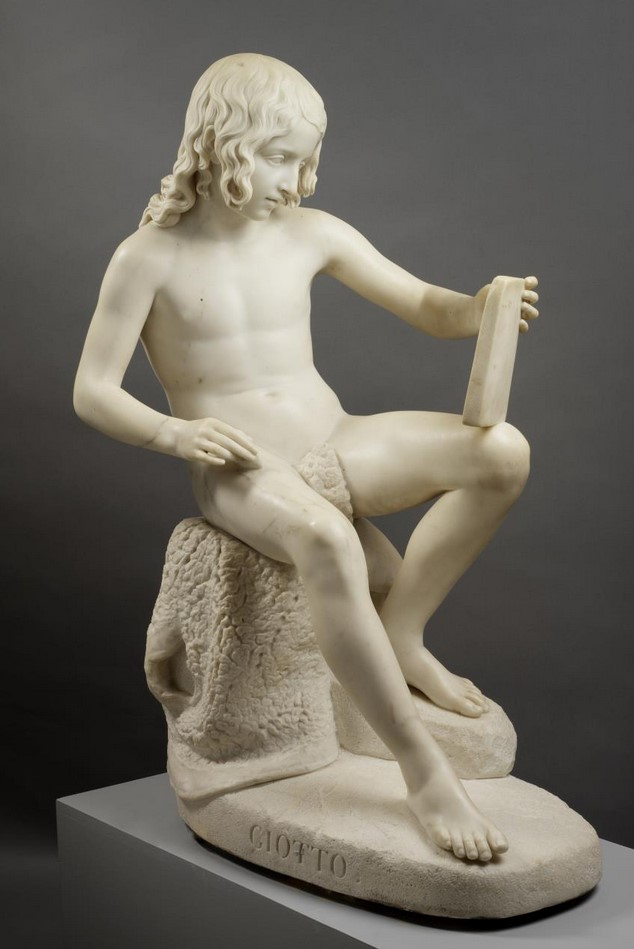
The young Giotto drawing

In 1844 he returned to Mechelen. He obtained various commissions. The memorial he made for his friend Jacobi Sturm, who had died in Rome in 1844, was unveiled in 1845 in the Chapel Church in Brussels. This memorial, placed against the wall, consists of a marble statue of a sleeping girl leaning on a cross, representing 'Submission', and a medallion representing Jacobi Sturm. For the same church, he sculpted in 1870 another memorial dedicated to the memory of pastor Emmanuel Willaert.

One of the major early commissions he received was from the Mechelen city council for a public statue of Margaret of Austria, the Governor of the Habsburg Netherlands whose court had been based in Mechelen. The statue was unveiled on 2 July 1849 in the presence of king Leopold I of Belgium, the royal family and an enthusiastic crowd that had flocked there from all parts of the country. In the following year he was appointed teacher of modelling, dissection and history of art at the Academy of Mechelen, a position he held until the end of his life. Tuerlinckx also participated actively in the exhibitions commencing from his time as a student at the academy.

He married Maria Philippina Merckx in 1862. The couple would have 11 children, the youngest one of whom also became a sculptor. In 1856 he was admitted as a member of the Royal Academy of Arts in Amsterdam. On 12 September 1857 he donated to the city council of Mechelen the collection of musical pieces written by his older brother. These had not been published and are only now being rediscovered and recorded.

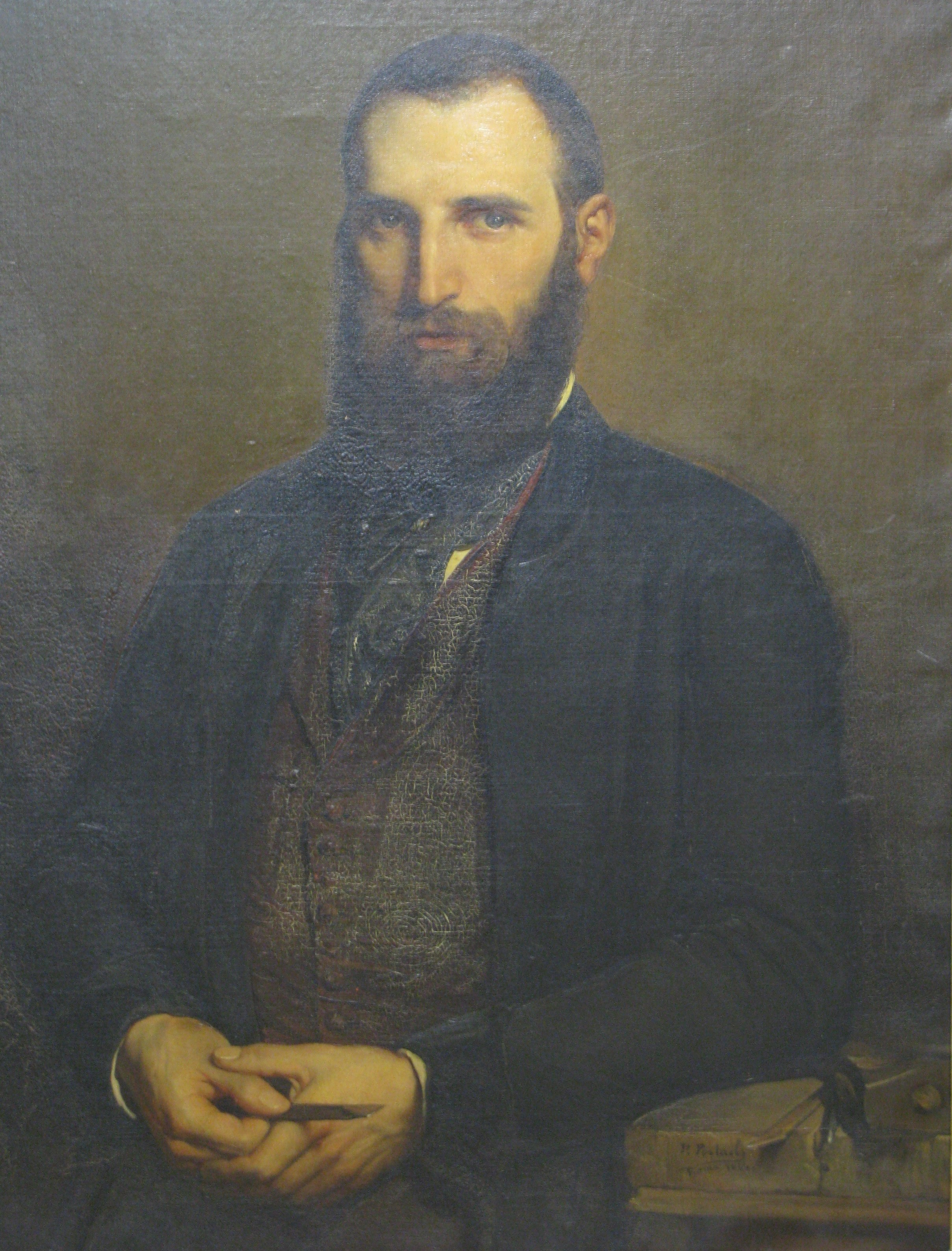
Joseph Tuerlinckx, as painted by Portaels in 1844 in Rome

He also donated to local museum a portrait of his father by Karel Pieter Verhulst and a portrait painted by Jean-François Portaels when they were both in Rome (both paintings are in the Museum Hof van Busleyden, Mechelen). He was awarded the Knight's Cross of the Order of Leopold on 8 September 1865.

He died on 6 February 1873 in Mechelen after an illness of four weeks.

== Work ==
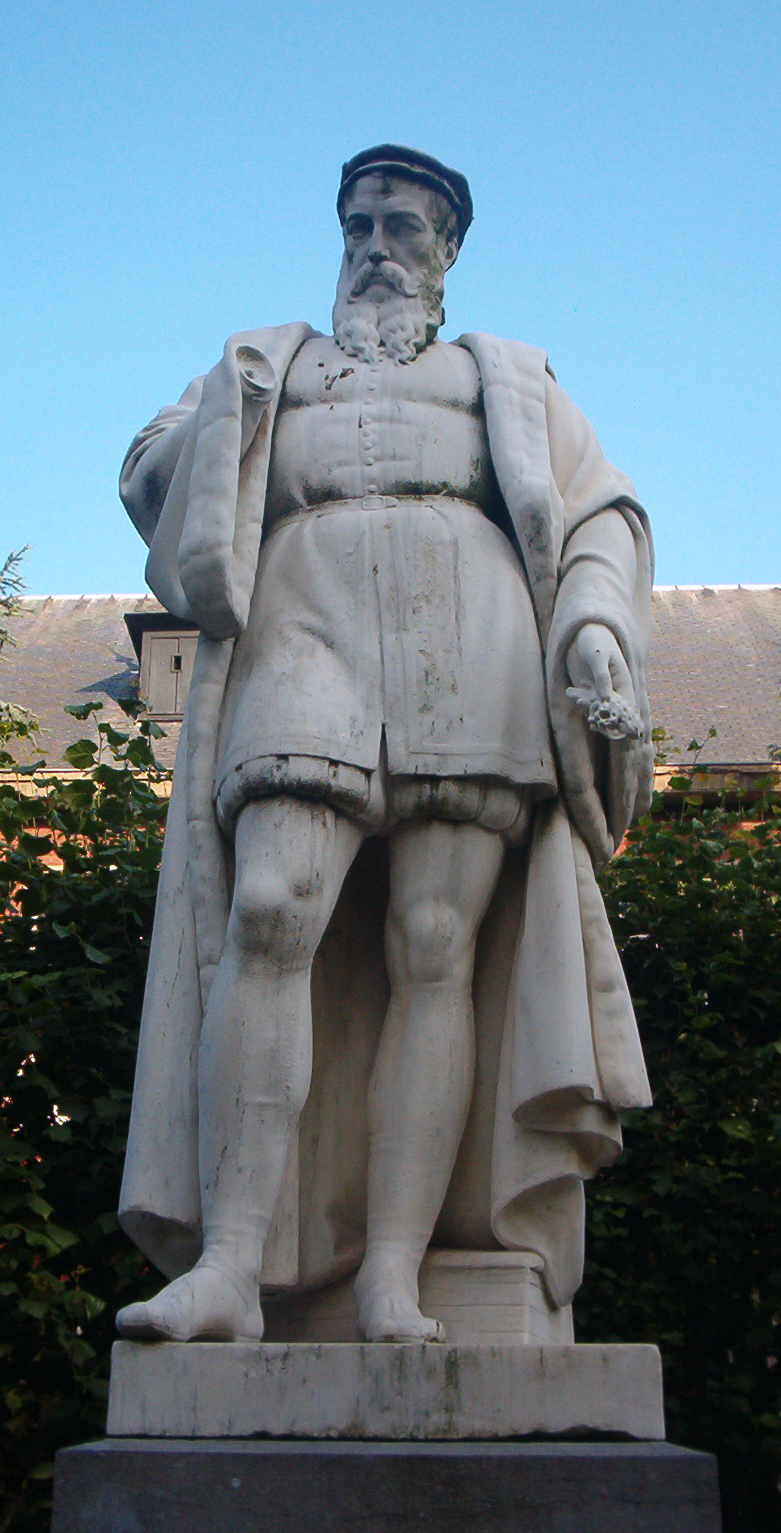
Statue of Rembert Dodoens

Tuerlinckx is known mainly for his historical portraits, statues of saints and funeral memorials. He made a few genre scenes. He also produced church furniture such as confessionals, choir stalls and communion benches. He worked in marble, terracotta and wood.

He sculpted the funeral column of the publishing family P.J. Hanicq, the Stations of the Cross in the Church of St. John the Baptist in Mechelen and the oak communion bench and the seats of the choir stalls in the Church of our Lady in Temse.

In Mechelen, he created a statue of the botanist Rembert Dodoens, which is in the Botanical Gardens of Mechelen.
