= Louis Royer =

Flemish sculptor (1793–1868)

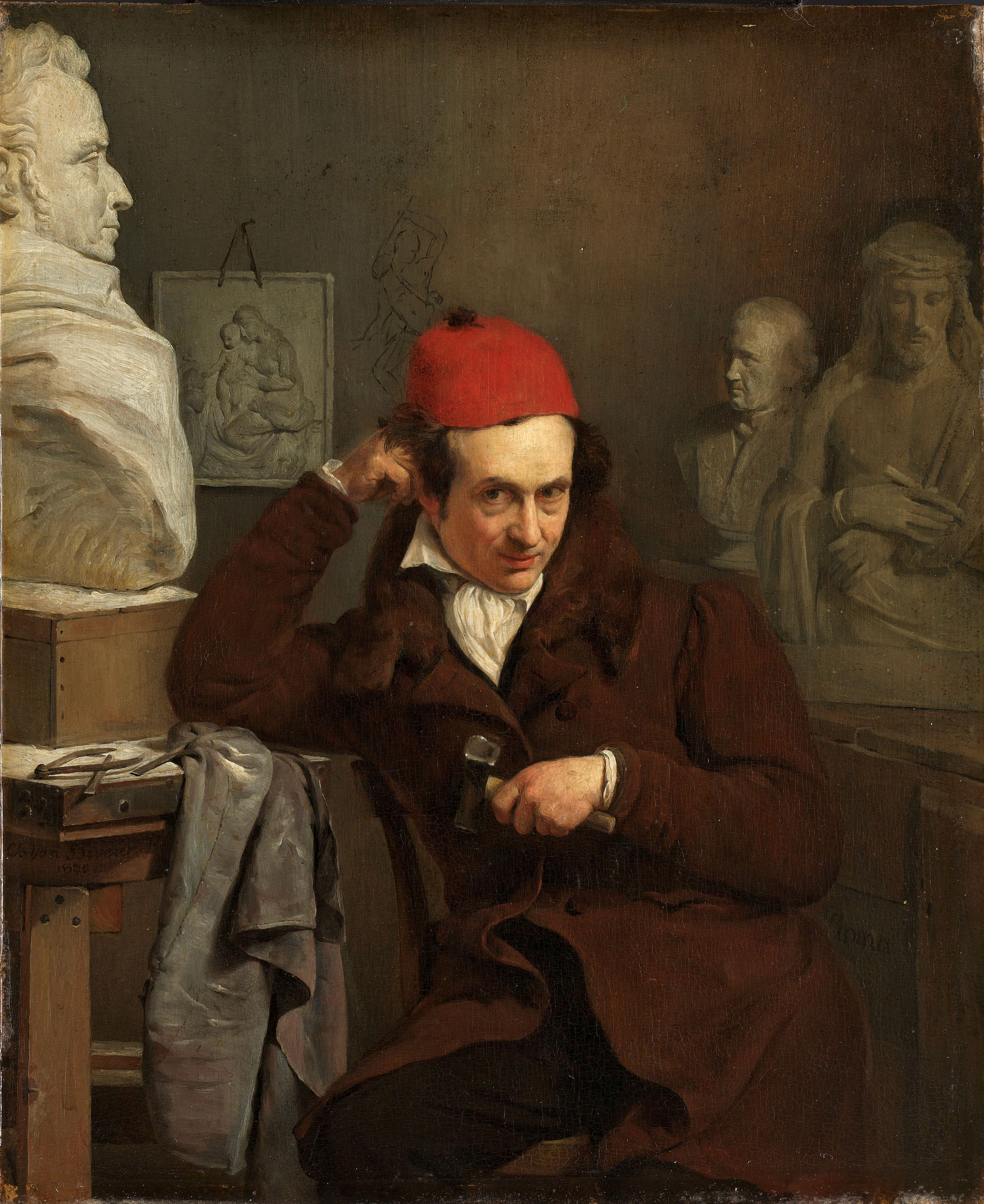
Portrait of Louis Royer by Charles Van Beveren, 1830, Rijksmuseum Amsterdam

Louis Royer (19 June 1793 – 5 June 1868), also Lodewyk Royer, was a Flemish sculptor who worked in the Netherlands where he received many commissions from the royal family and for public statues.

== Life ==
=== Apprenticeship ===
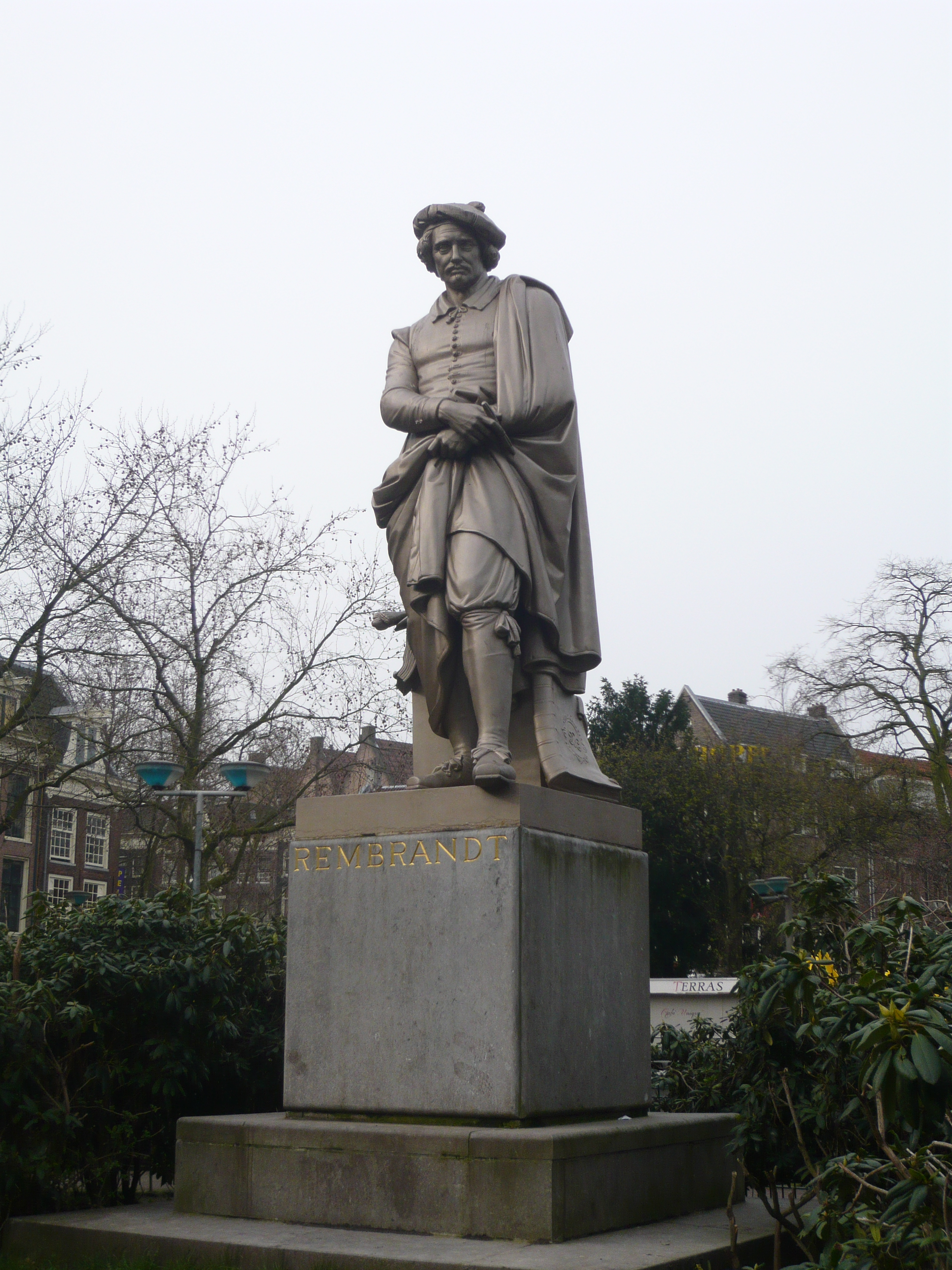
Statue of Rembrandt on the Rembrandtplein in Amsterdam

He was born in Mechelen where he first studied at the local Academy and from 1810 in the studio of Jan Frans van Geel. After studying in Paris for a year, he went to live in Amsterdam in 1820. At the time what is now Belgium and the Netherlands were united in one kingdom under the rule of the Dutch. In 1823 he was the first sculptor to win the Dutch version of the Dutch Prix de Rome, a prize that was re-instituted by King William I in 1817. The Prix allowed Royer to study in Rome where he came under classicist influences.

He worked in an area close to the Spanish Steps where he must have been in contact with Bertel Thorvaldsen and the studio of Antonio Canova, who was already deceased but whose workshop with his pupils was still operational. While in Rome, Royers experienced financial difficulties because of the problems of the commission which awarded him the Dutch Prix de Rome and the bankruptcy of his patron, the Amsterdam stockbroker A.B. Roothaan. Despite these problems, Royer remained very productive, and only found time to travel once, to Naples. In Rome he sculpted a portrait of his friend, the painter Cornelis Kruseman. He gained a lot of admiration for his portrait of Pope Leo XII, whom he portrayed from life.

=== Return to the Netherlands ===
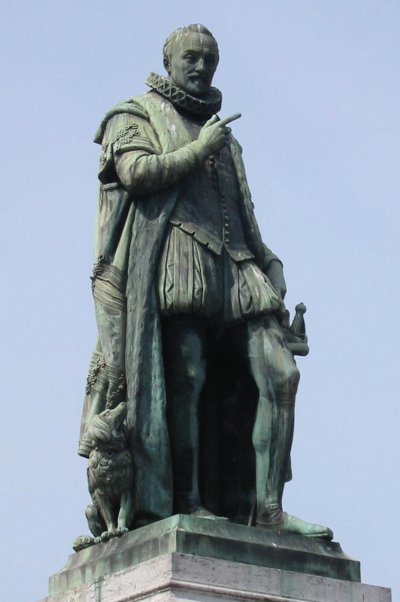
Statue of William the Silent in The Hague

In 1827 Royer returned from Rome and settled in The Hague, an important artistic centre after the royal family had moved there from Amsterdam. He was soon appointed court sculptor and he made portraits of all members of the royal family in busts of marble. Shortly afterwards he was also appointed director of the Royal Academy of Art in Amsterdam.

After moving to Amsterdam in 1837, Royer received many public commissions for statues of leading personalities from Dutch history, such as the statues of Rembrandt and Joost van den Vondel in Amsterdam, William the Silent in The Hague and Michiel de Ruyter in Vlissingen. His monumental sculptures of Dutch national heroes gave form to the rising nationalism in the country that had recently recovered its independence after French occupation and wanted to be reminded of its glorious past.

Royer was in 1839 one of the founders of the artist society Arti et Amicitiae in Amsterdam. Royer's work received wide public recognition and he was given a Royal award three times.

After his death in Amsterdam in 1868, Royer's widow offered the estate of her husband to the Dutch State. The refusal of the offer was communicated by politician Thorbecke whose bust Royer had previously made. The estate was subsequently auctioned and an important part of it was bought by intimates and friends of the artist.

== Work ==
Royer was during his lifetime the most important sculptor in the Netherlands. He was known as the "Canova of the Netherlands" and later he was simply referred to as "the sculptor." He had virtually no competition. In addition to monumental works, he made many salon portraits, allegorical representations and works with religious subjects including reliefs for the St. Francis Xavier Church in Amsterdam. He worked principally in marble, terracotta, earthenware and plaster. He was trained in the Flemish Baroque style and later came under the influence of Classicism while studying in Paris and Rome. His works were inspired by classical sculpture and have an idealising character. He is thus close to the French and Flemish academism that he was familiar with through his training. Many of his drawings have been preserved.

After Classicism had fallen out of fashion, Royer was quickly forgotten by the general public. In an attempt to save him from oblivion the Museum Amstelkring in Amsterdam organized in 1994 a retrospective of his work, which coincided with an exhibition of contemporary photos of his statues in the Flemish cultural centre De Brakke Grond in Amsterdam.

He trained many pupils including August Allebé, David Adolph Constant Artz, Hein Burgers, Gottlob Christoph Jacob Fischer, Eduard François Georges, S. van der Goen, Jozef Israëls, Cornelis Nicolaas Looman, Johan Philip Menger, Eduard Roskam, Theo Simons, Hendrik D. Jzn Sluyter, Johan Hendrik Stöver, Joseph Tuerlinckx and Elisabeth Verwoert.
